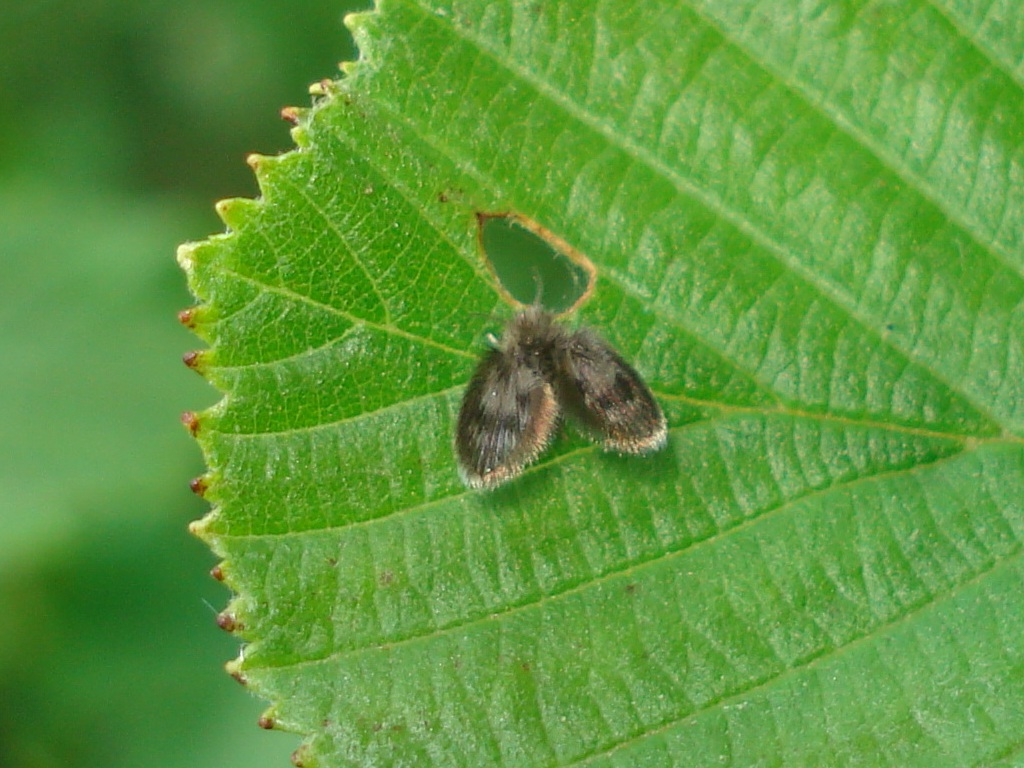
- Ulomyia fuliginosa

Scientific classification
- Kingdom: Animalia
- Phylum: Arthropoda
- Class: Insecta
- Order: Diptera
- Family: Psychodidae
- Subfamily: Psychodinae
- Tribe: Pericomaini
- Genus: Ulomyia; Haliday, in Walker, 1856

Type species
- Psychoda fuliginosa Meigen, 1804

= Ulomyia =

Genus of flies

Ulomyia is a genus of flies belonging to the family Psychodidae.

== Distribution ==
The species of this genus are found in Eurasia and Northern America.

== Species ==
- Ulomyia annulata (Tonnoir, 1919)
- Ulomyia asiaminorica Wagner, 2013
- Ulomyia basaltica Vaillant, 1983
- Ulomyia bulgarica Wagner & Joost, 1988
- Ulomyia canisquamata (Tokunaga, 1961)
- Ulomyia cognata (Eaton, 1893)
- Ulomyia expetenda Wagner, 1978
- Ulomyia fuliginosa (Meigen, 1804)
- Ulomyia hispanica (Sarà, 1954)
- Ulomyia ibirica Wagner, Andrade & Gonsalves, 2022
- Ulomyia incurva Feuerborn, 1922
- Ulomyia itoi (Tokunaga, 1961)
- Ulomyia kaszabi Vaillant, 1973
- Ulomyia mirabilis (Sarà, 1952)
- Ulomyia montanoi Salamanna & Raggio, 1985
- Ulomyia montium Vaillant, 1983
- Ulomyia ophicornis Vaillant, 1983
- Ulomyia rostrata Vaillant, 1983
- Ulomyia scurina (Vaillant, 1958)
- Ulomyia spinifera Krek, 1990
- Ulomyia spinosa Krek, 1972
- Ulomyia szaboi Vaillant, 1983
- Ulomyia umbripennis Vaillant, 1983
- Ulomyia undulata (Tonnoir, 1919)
- Ulomyia vaseki Ježek, 2002
- Ulomyia yanoi (Tokunaga & Komyo, 1955)
