= Panimerus =

Scientific classification
- Domain: Eukaryota
- Kingdom: Animalia
- Phylum: Arthropoda
- Class: Insecta
- Order: Diptera
- Family: Psychodidae
- Subfamily: Psychodinae
- Tribe: Paramormiini
- Genus: Panimerus; Eaton, 1913

Type species
- Tipula hirta Linnaeus, 1761

Genus of flies

Panimerus is a genus of flies belonging to the family Psychodidae.

== Species ==
- Panimerus albifacies (Tonnoir, 1919)
- Panimerus arnaudi Wagner, 1984
- Panimerus basalis (Banks, 1907)
- Panimerus cio (Quate, 1955)
- Panimerus denticulatus Krek, 1972
- Panimerus dysmica (Quate, 1955)
- Panimerus elongatus Wagner, 1981
- Panimerus freidbergi Wagner, 1984
- Panimerus goetghebueri (Tonnoir, 1919)
- Panimerus goodi Vaillant & Withers, 1992
- Panimerus halophilus Kvifte & Salmela, 2020
- Panimerus hermelinus Vaillant & Moubayed, 1987
- Panimerus idukii Ipe, Ipe & Kishore, 1986
- Panimerus idukkii Ipe, Ipe & Kishore, 1986
- Panimerus integellus (Jung, 1956)
- Panimerus kalathensis Ipe & Singh, 1994
- Panimerus kreki Vaillant, 1972
- Panimerus lucens Vaillant, 1973
- Panimerus maynei (Tonnoir, 1920)
- Panimerus nadorensis Eaton, 1913
- Panimerus notabilis (Eaton, 1893)
- Panimerus przhiboroi Wagner, 2005
- Panimerus ruehmi Elger, 1979
- Panimerus sarai Salamanna, 1975
- Panimerus scalus (Haseman, 1907)
- Panimerus scotti Eaton, 1913
- Panimerus serbicus Krek, 1985
- Panimerus sierra (Quate, 1955)
- Panimerus unae Krek, 1978
- Panimerus verneysicus Vaillant, 1972
