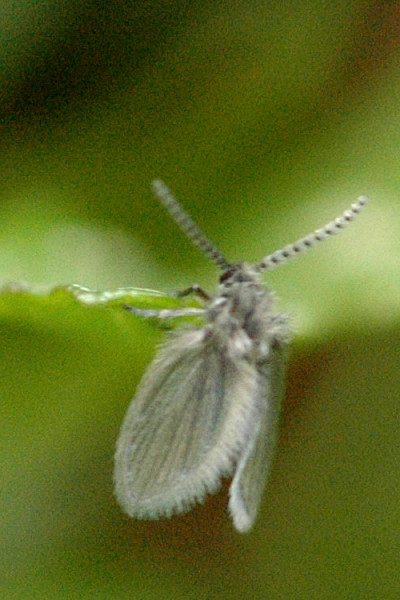
- Psychoda grisescens

Scientific classification
- Kingdom: Animalia
- Phylum: Arthropoda
- Class: Insecta
- Order: Diptera
- Family: Psychodidae
- Subfamily: Psychodinae; Newman, 1834

= Psychodinae =

Subfamily of flies

Psychoda cf. surcoufi on oak leaves

The Psychodinae are the nominate subfamily of moth flies (Psychodidae), also known as drain flies. Like most of their relatives, they are usually found in damp habitats; some occur in caves. The small larvae are aquatic or semi-terrestrial; the adults are winged and capable of flight. Psychodinae are found worldwide, including some subantarctic islands.

== Description ==
Adult Psychodinae are small flies that do not exceed 5–6 mm in length. Their body, legs and wings are covered in many setae which (in males) are often pigmented, resulting in colour patterns. Their eyes are usually reniform (kidney shaped) and connected dorsomedially by an eye-bridge. The antennae each consist of a scape, pedicel and 12-14 flagellomeres, and each flagellomere has one or more ascoids of variable shape. The wings are ovate (egg shaped) in shape with 9-10 longitudinal veins and almost no crossveins. Species of Psychodinae often look similar, only being distinguishable by the shape of the male genitalia.

Larval Psychodinae are segmented with each segment subdivided and each subdivision dorsally sclerotised. The tergal sclerites have true and accessorial setae which are useful for determining species. Unlike in other subfamilies of Psychodidae, the abdomen ends in a tubular siphon tipped with spiracles.

== Habitat and diet ==
The larval biology of Psychodinae has mainly been studied for Palearctic and Nearctic taxa, with less known about Afrotropical taxa. Most are detritivores in marginal freshwater habitats such as the edges of springs and streams, waterlogged soils and phytotelmata. They also occur in leaf litter, compost, decaying wood, fungal fruiting bodies, dung, carrion, caves, drains and sewage pipes. A few species may cause myiasis.

Pupation occurs on the surface of the organic film inhabited by larvae.

Humans may encounter adult Psychodinae in bathrooms and sewage installations. Adults are drawn to artificial light. They feed on polluted water and the nectar of flowers.

== Reproduction ==
Males locate females using species-specific pheromones, and also produce pheromones themselves for courtship. Psychodid antennae have sensilla that may be used for detecting these pheromones. Many Psychodinae also have specialised secondary sexual characteristics for release and detection of chemical cues. They also use visual and tactile displays.

== Tribes and genera ==
Maruinini Enderlein, 1937

- Alloeodidicrum Duckhouse, 1990
- Didicrum Enderlein, 1937
- Eremolobulosa Duckhouse, 1990
- Maruina Müller, 1895
- Paratelmatoscopus Satchell, 1953
- Rotundopteryx Duckhouse, 1990

Setomimini Vaillant, 1982

- Arisemus Satchell, 1955
- Australopericoma Vaillant, 1975
- Balbagathis Quate, 1996
- Lobulosa Szabo, 1960
- Neoarisemus Botosaneanu & Vaillant, 1970
- Parasetomima Duckhouse, 1968
- Platyplastinx Enderlein, 1937
- Setomima Enderlein, 1937
- Tonnoiriella Vaillant, 1982

Mormiini Enderlein, 1937

- Atrichobrunettia Satchell, 1953
- Brunettia Annandale, 1910
- Gerobrunettia Quate & Quate, 1967
- Mormia Enderlein, 1935

Paramormiini Enderlein, 1937

- Clogmia Enderlein, 1937
- Eurygarka Quate, 1959
- Feuerborniella Vaillant, 1971
- Panimerus Eaton, 1913
- Paramormia Enderlein, 1935
- Peripsychoda Enderlein, 1935
- Philosepedon Eaton, 1904
- Telmatoscopus Eaton, 1904
- Threticus Eaton, 1904
- Trichopsychoda Tonnoir, 1922
- Vaillantodes Wagner, 2002

Pericomaini Enderlein, 1935

- Bazarella Vaillant, 1961
- Berdeniella Vaillant, 1971
- Breviscapus Quate, 1955
- Clytocerus Eaton, 1904
- Lepidiella Enderlein, 1937
- Notiocharis Eaton, 1913
- Pericoma Haliday, in Walker, 1856
- Pneumia Enderlein, 1935
- Saraiella Vaillant, 1981
- Stupkaiella Vaillant, 1973
- Szaboiella Vaillant, 1979
- Thornburghiella Vaillant, 1982
- Ulomyia Haliday, in Walker, 1856 (= Saccopterix Haliday, in Curtis, 1839, preoccupied)

Psychodini Quate, 1959

- Epacretron Quate, 1965
- Psychoda Latreille, 1796
