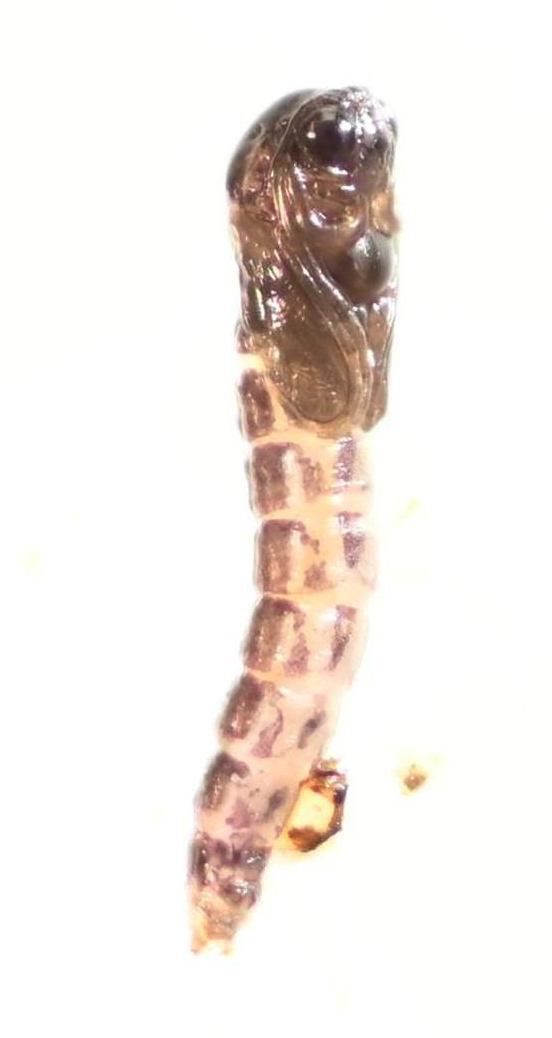
- Pupa of Limnophyes viribus

Scientific classification
- Kingdom: Animalia
- Phylum: Arthropoda
- Clade: Pancrustacea
- Class: Insecta
- Order: Diptera
- Family: Chironomidae
- Subfamily: Orthocladiinae
- Genus: Limnophyes; Eaton, 1875

= Limnophyes =

Genus of flies

Limnophyes is a genus of non-biting midges belonging to the family Chironomidae.

== Species ==
Species include:

=== Holarctic species ===
- L. asquamatus
- L. brachytomus
- L. eltoni
- L. minimus - global distribution except Australasia
- L. natalensis - global distribution except Australasia and South America
- L. ninae
- L. pentaplastus
- L. pumilio

=== European species ===
- L. aagaardi - Norway, Eastern Palaearctic
- L. angelicae - British Isles, Germany, European Russia
- L. bidumus - Scandinavia, Germany, Italy
- L. convexiusculus Makarchenko et Makarchenko, 2013 - Far Eastern Russia
- L. cranstoni - France, Andorra
- L. difficilis - Palaearctic
- L. edwardsi - Palaearctic
- L. er - Scandinavia, European Russia
- L. gurgicola - Palaearctic, Indomalaya, Near East
- L. habilis - Palaearctic
- L. inanispatina - France
- L. italicola - Italy
- L. madeirae - Madeira
- L. palmensis - Canary Islands
- L. paludis - Britain, Northwest Europe
- L. prolatus - Germany, Novaya Zemlya
- L. punctipennis - Western Europe
- L. roquehautensis - France
- L. schnelli - far north of Palaearctic
- L. spinigus - Scandinavia, Central Europe
- L. torulus - Norway, Novaya Zemlya

=== Nearctic species ===
- L. anderseni
- L. atomarius
- L. carolinensis
- L. coloradensis
- L. doughmani
- L. fumosus
- L. hastulatus
- L. margaretae
- L. pilicistulus
- L. prolongatus
- L. recisus
