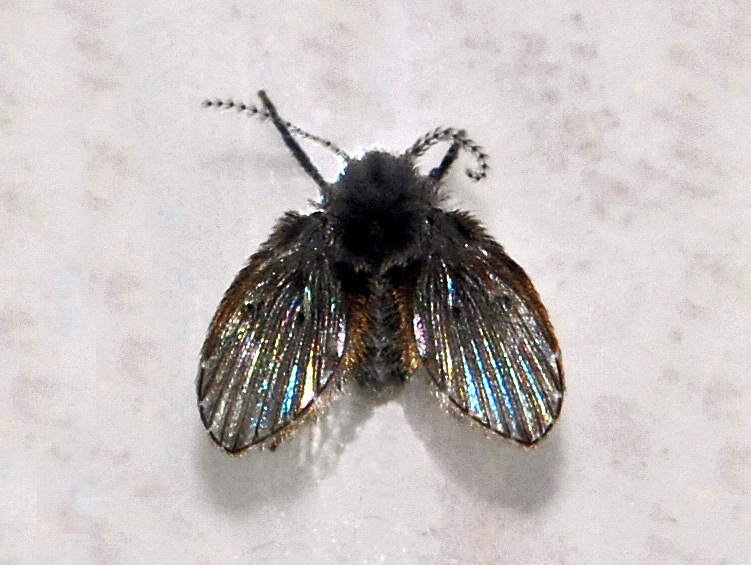
- Clogmia albipunctata

Scientific classification
- Domain: Eukaryota
- Kingdom: Animalia
- Phylum: Arthropoda
- Class: Insecta
- Order: Diptera
- Family: Psychodidae
- Subfamily: Psychodinae
- Tribe: Paramormiini
- Genus: Clogmia; Enderlein, 1937

= Clogmia =

Genus of flies

Clogmia is a genus of drain flies in the subfamily Psychodinae.

== Species ==
- Clogmia albipunctata (Williston, 1893)
- Clogmia bidentata Ježek, 2004
- Clogmia caboverdeana (Ježek & Harten, 1996)
- Clogmia fuscipennis (Tonnoir, 1920)
- Clogmia poncianicola (Satchell, 1953)
