= Feuerborniella =

Scientific classification
- Kingdom: Animalia
- Phylum: Arthropoda
- Class: Insecta
- Order: Diptera
- Family: Psychodidae
- Subfamily: Psychodinae
- Tribe: Paramormiini
- Genus: Feuerborniella; Vaillant, 1971

Type species
- Psychoda obscura Tonnoir, 1919

Synonyms
- Bahisepedon Omelková & Ježek, 2012

Genus of insects

Feuerborniella is a genus of flies belonging to the family Psychodidae.

== Distribution ==
The species of this genus are found in Europe, Asia, Northern and Southern America.

== Species ==
- Feuerborniella amblytes (Quate, 1999)
- Feuerborniella ancepitis (Quate, 1996)
- Feuerborniella bicuspis (Quate, 1996)
- Feuerborniella concava Cordeiro & Bravo, 2015
- Feuerborniella hamata (Quate, 1996)
- Feuerborniella jezeki Cordeiro & Bravo, 2015
- Feuerborniella malayensis (Satchell, 1955)
- Feuerborniella oblongola (Bravo, Chagas & Cordeiro, 2006)
- Feuerborniella obscura (Tonnoir, 1919)
- Feuerborniella opposita (Banks, 1901)
- Feuerborniella pandiculata (Quate, 1996)
- Feuerborniella paramuna Cordeiro, 2014
- Feuerborniella pilosella Cordeiro & Bravo, 2015
- Feuerborniella plaumanni (Duckhouse, 1968)
- Feuerborniella pollicaris (Quate, 1996)
- Feuerborniella retusa (Quate, 1996)
- Feuerborniella spathipenis (Duckhouse, 1968)
- Feuerborniella uncinata (Bravo, Chagas & Cordeiro, 2006)
- Feuerborniella veracruzana Ibáñez-Bernal, 2004
- Feuerborniella vieirai (Chagas, Bravo & Rafael, 2009)
