= Eutonnoiria =

- Eutonnoiria wing

Scientific classification
- Kingdom: Animalia
- Phylum: Arthropoda
- Class: Insecta
- Order: Diptera
- Family: Psychodidae
- Subfamily: Bruchomyiinae
- Genus: Eutonnoiria; Alexander, 1940

Type species
- Bruchomyia edwardsi Tonnoir, 1939

Synonyms
- Tonnoiromyia Alexander, 1979

Genus of flies

Eutonnoiria is a monotypic genus of moth flies in the subfamily Bruchomyiinae.

== Species ==
- Eutonnoiria edwardsi (Tonnoir, 1939)

== Distribution ==
Uganda.
