= Jungiella =

Scientific classification
- Domain: Eukaryota
- Kingdom: Animalia
- Phylum: Arthropoda
- Class: Insecta
- Order: Diptera
- Family: Psychodidae
- Genus: Jungiella; Vaillant, 1972

Genus of flies

Jungiella is a genus of fly belonging to the family Psychodidae.

The genus was first described by Vaillant in 1972.

The species of this genus are found in Europe.

Species include:

- Jungiella consors
- Jungiella pseudolongicornis
