= Horaiellinae =

Scientific classification
- Kingdom: Animalia
- Phylum: Arthropoda
- Class: Insecta
- Order: Diptera
- Family: Psychodidae
- Subfamily: Horaiellinae; Enderlein, 1937

Subfamily of moth flies

The Horaiellinae is subfamily of moth flies in the order Diptera.

== Genera ==
- Horaiella Tonnoir, 1933
- †Protohoraiella Curler, Krzeminski & Skibinska, 2019
