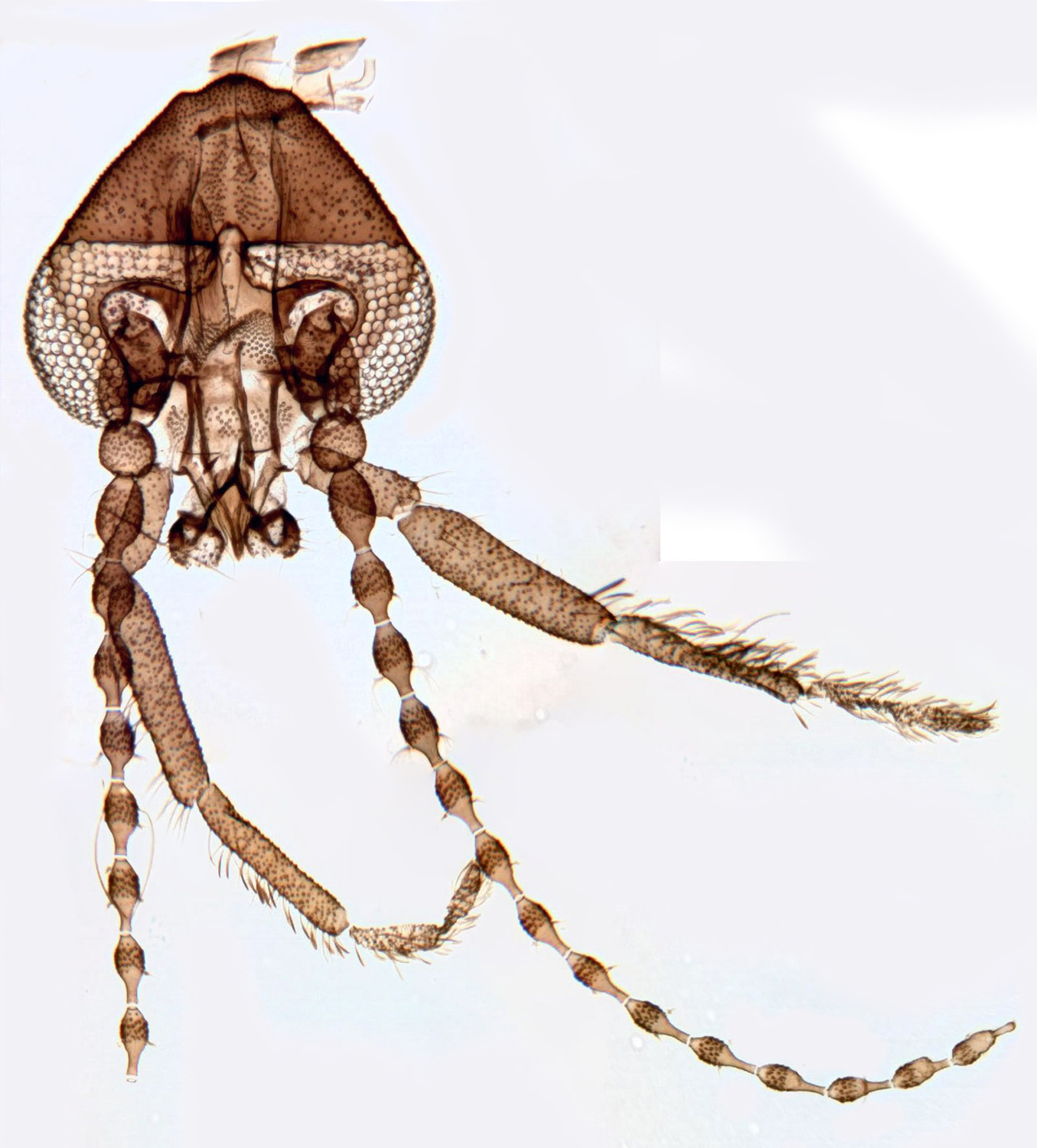

Scientific classification
- Kingdom: Animalia
- Phylum: Arthropoda
- Class: Insecta
- Order: Diptera
- Family: Psychodidae
- Subfamily: Psychodinae
- Tribe: Paramormiini
- Genus: Peripsychoda; Enderlein, 1937

Type species
- Psychoda fusca Macquart, 1826

Synonyms
- Nototelmatoscopus Satchell, 1953; Oreoscopus Quate & Quate, 1967; Oscoreopus Ježek, 1989

= Peripsychoda =

Genus of flies

Peripsychoda is a genus of flies belonging to the family Psychodidae.

== Distribution ==
The species of this genus are found in Europe, Asia and Australia.

== Species ==
- Peripsychoda adusta (Quate & Quate, 1967)
- Peripsychoda agrestis (Quate & Quate, 1967)
- Peripsychoda ambalata (Quate & Quate, 1967)
- Peripsychoda appendiculata (Quate & Quate, 1967)
- Peripsychoda aurasica (Vaillant, 1958)
- Peripsychoda auriculata (Haliday, 1839)
- Peripsychoda baitabagensis (Quate & Quate, 1967)
- Peripsychoda bulbula (Quate & Quate, 1967)
- Peripsychoda castanea (Quate & Quate, 1967)
- Peripsychoda centraceps (Quate & Quate, 1967)
- Peripsychoda clavicula (Quate, 1962)
- Peripsychoda confraga (Quate & Quate, 1967)
- Peripsychoda cracenta (Quate & Quate, 1967)
- Peripsychoda crassepalpis (Satchell, 1953)
- Peripsychoda dimorpha (Tonnoir, 1953)
- Peripsychoda empheres (Quate & Quate, 1967)
- Peripsychoda festiva (Satchell, 1953)
- Peripsychoda fragilis (Quate & Quate, 1967)
- Peripsychoda fusca (Macquart, 1826)
- Peripsychoda globalaris (Quate & Quate, 1967)
- Peripsychoda gregsoni (Tonnoir, 1953)
- Peripsychoda hirsuta (Quate & Quate, 1967)
- Peripsychoda iranica Ježek, 1987
- Peripsychoda kratkensis (Quate & Quate, 1967)
- Peripsychoda lippa (Quate & Quate, 1967)
- Peripsychoda lobella (Quate & Quate, 1967)
- Peripsychoda longicera (Quate & Quate, 1967)
- Peripsychoda longipalpi Ipe, Ipe & Kishore, 1986
- Peripsychoda nicholsoni (Satchell, 1953)
- Peripsychoda nigritarsis Enderlein, 1937
- Peripsychoda obscura (Satchell, 1953)
- Peripsychoda obtusalata (Quate & Quate, 1967)
- Peripsychoda pholidotes (Quate, 1962)
- Peripsychoda ramosa (Quate, 1962)
- Peripsychoda reburra (Quate & Quate, 1967)
- Peripsychoda repanda (Quate & Quate, 1967)
- Peripsychoda scarificata (Quate & Quate, 1967)
- Peripsychoda sisypha (Quate & Quate, 1967)
- Peripsychoda slenderstyli Ipe, Ipe & Kishore, 1986
- Peripsychoda spuriosa (Quate & Quate, 1967)
- Peripsychoda tridentata (Quate & Quate, 1967)
- Peripsychoda viduata (Tonnoir, 1953)
- Peripsychoda wauensis (Quate & Quate, 1967)
- Peripsychoda zangherii Sarà, 1952
- Peripsychoda zbytka Ježek, 2004
- Peripsychoda zygops (Quate & Quate, 1967)
