= Paramormia =

Scientific classification
- Kingdom: Animalia
- Phylum: Arthropoda
- Class: Insecta
- Order: Diptera
- Family: Psychodidae
- Subfamily: Psychodinae
- Tribe: Paramormiini
- Genus: Paramormia; Enderlein, 1937

Type species
- Pericoma fratercula Eaton, 1893

Synonyms
- Douckhousiella Krek, 1984; Duckhousiella Vaillant, 1971; Duckhousiella Vaillant, 1972

Genus of flies

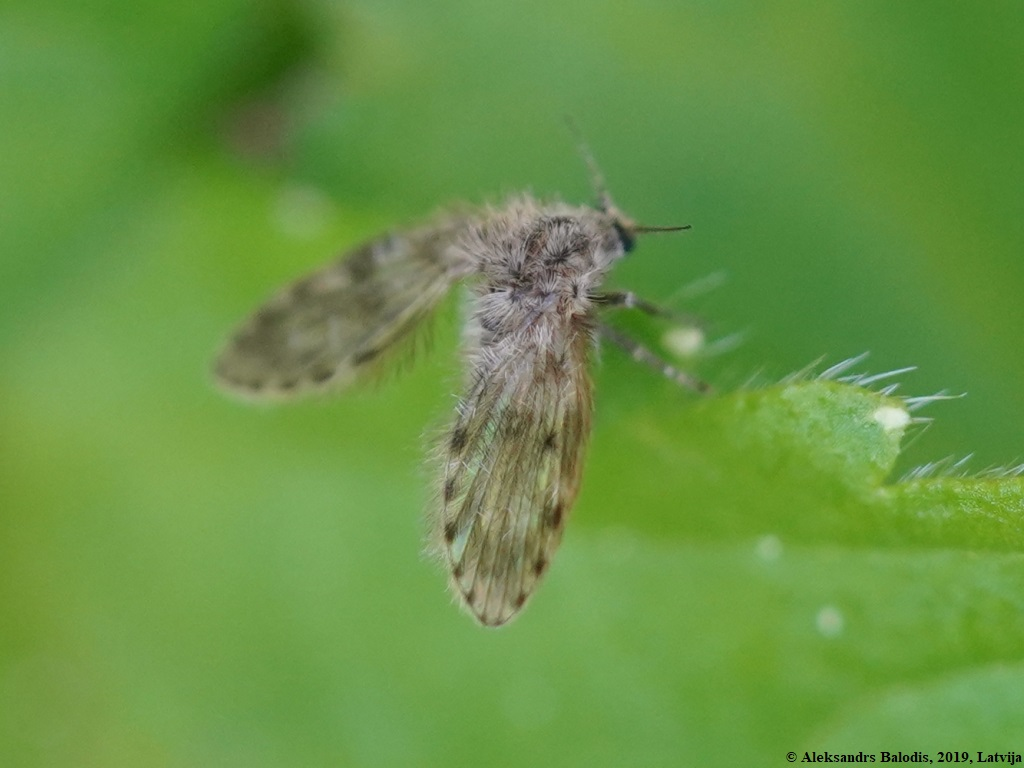
An example of Paramormia ustulata

Paramormia is a genus of flies belonging to the family Psychodidae.

== Distribution ==
Europe, Asia, Africa and North America.

== Species ==
- Paramormia acuta (Krek, 1971)
- Paramormia corniculata (Vaillant, 1973)
- Paramormia cornuta (Nielsen, 1964)
- Paramormia decipiens (Eaton, 1893)
- Paramormia fluviatilis Ježek, 2004
- Paramormia fratercula (Eaton, 1893)
- Paramormia itoi (Tokunaga, 196)
- Paramormia longipennis (Krek, 1972)
- Paramormia pollinensis (Sarà, 1951)
- Paramormia polyascoidea (Krek, 1971)
- Paramormia subcostalis Ježek, 2004
- Paramormia ustulata (Haliday, 1856)
- Paramormia watermaelica (Vaillant, 1972)
