= Sycorax (disambiguation) =

Sycorax is a character mentioned though not seen in William Shakespeare's play The Tempest.

Sycorax may also refer to:

- Sycorax (moon), a moon of Uranus, named after the fictional character
- Sycorax (typeface), a combination of typefaces and spelling used by the poet Kamau Brathwaite
- Sycorax, a fictional planet, and alien race from the Doctor Who episode "The Christmas Invasion"
- Sycorax (fly), a genus of moth flies in the family Psychodidae
