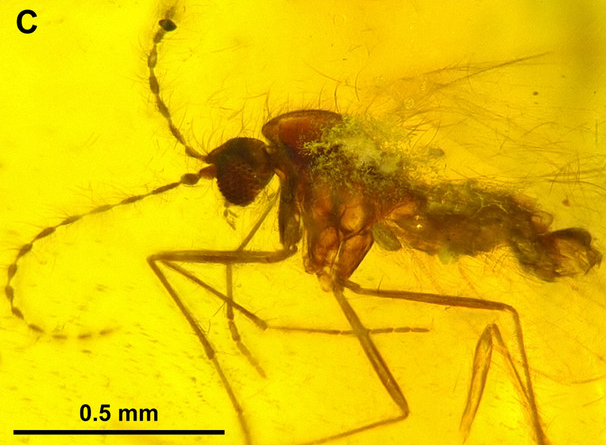
- Adult male of Parasycorax simplex

Scientific classification
- Kingdom: Animalia
- Phylum: Arthropoda
- Clade: Pancrustacea
- Class: Insecta
- Order: Diptera
- Family: Psychodidae
- Subfamily: Sycoracinae; Jung, 1954

Genera
- Aposycorax; Parasycorax; Sycorax

= Sycoracinae =

Subfamily of blood-feeding moth flies

Sycoracinae is a subfamily of moth flies in the family Psychodidae. Unlike most moth flies, which have reduced mouthparts and cryptic habits, females of Sycoracinae are equipped to feed on vertebrate blood.

== Genera ==
The subfamily comprises three extant genera:

- Aposycorax – Contains one species restricted to the Andean region.
- Parasycorax – Includes four Neotropical species and one species from the Philippines.
- Sycorax – The most widely distributed genus, with over 40 described species across various continents.

== Ecology and larval habits ==
Most species within the Sycoracinae are thought to feed primarily on reptiles and amphibians, although direct behavioural observations are limited. For instance, Sycorax silacea has been documented feeding on the European edible frog, Pelophylax esculentus, and can serve as a vector for filarial parasites. Similarly, the Ecuadorian species Sycorax wampukrum has been observed preying upon harlequin frogs (Atelopus spp.).

Larvae of European Sycoracinae develop in moist mosses along streams. The larval habitats of tropical genera are currently unknown.
