= Didicrum =

Scientific classification
- Kingdom: Animalia
- Phylum: Arthropoda
- Clade: Pancrustacea
- Class: Insecta
- Order: Diptera
- Family: Psychodidae
- Subfamily: Psychodinae
- Tribe: Maruinini
- Genus: Didicrum; Enderlein, 1937

Type species
- Pericoma griseata Tonnoir, 1929

Genus of flies

Didicrum is a genus of the family Psychodidae and has a handful of species studied so far. The discovery of this genus in Colombia represents a significant range extension for Didicrum as all previously described species of this genus are distributed in the Australasian region and the southernmost portion of South America.

== Species ==
- Didicrum agreste (Quate & Quate, 1967)
- Didicrum clarkei (Satchell, 1954)
- Didicrum claviatum (Satchell, 1950)
- Didicrum colombense Moya-Arévalo, Ibnáñez-Bernal & Suárez-Landa, 2012
- Didicrum contiguum (Tonnoir, 1929)
- Didicrum deceptrix Quate & Brown, 2004
- Didicrum drepanatum (Satchell, 1950)
- Didicrum fenestratum (Tonnoir, 1929)
- Didicrum griseatum (Tonnoir, 1929)
- Didicrum inornatum (Tonnoir, 1929)
- Didicrum letitiae Omad, 2014
- Didicrum maurum (Satchell, 1950)
- Didicrum naimae Omad, 2014
- Didicrum peregrinum (Quate & Quate, 1967)
- Didicrum punctulatum (Tonnoir, 1953)
- Didicrum pyramidon Quate & Brown, 2004
- Didicrum remulum Quate & Brown, 2004
- Didicrum simplex (Tonnoir, 1929)
- Didicrum solitarium (Satchell, 1954)
- Didicrum steffani (Quate & Quate, 1967)
- Didicrum triuncinatum (Satchell, 1950)
- Didicrum uniformatum (Tonnoir, 1953)
- Didicrum viduatum (Tonnoir, 1929)
