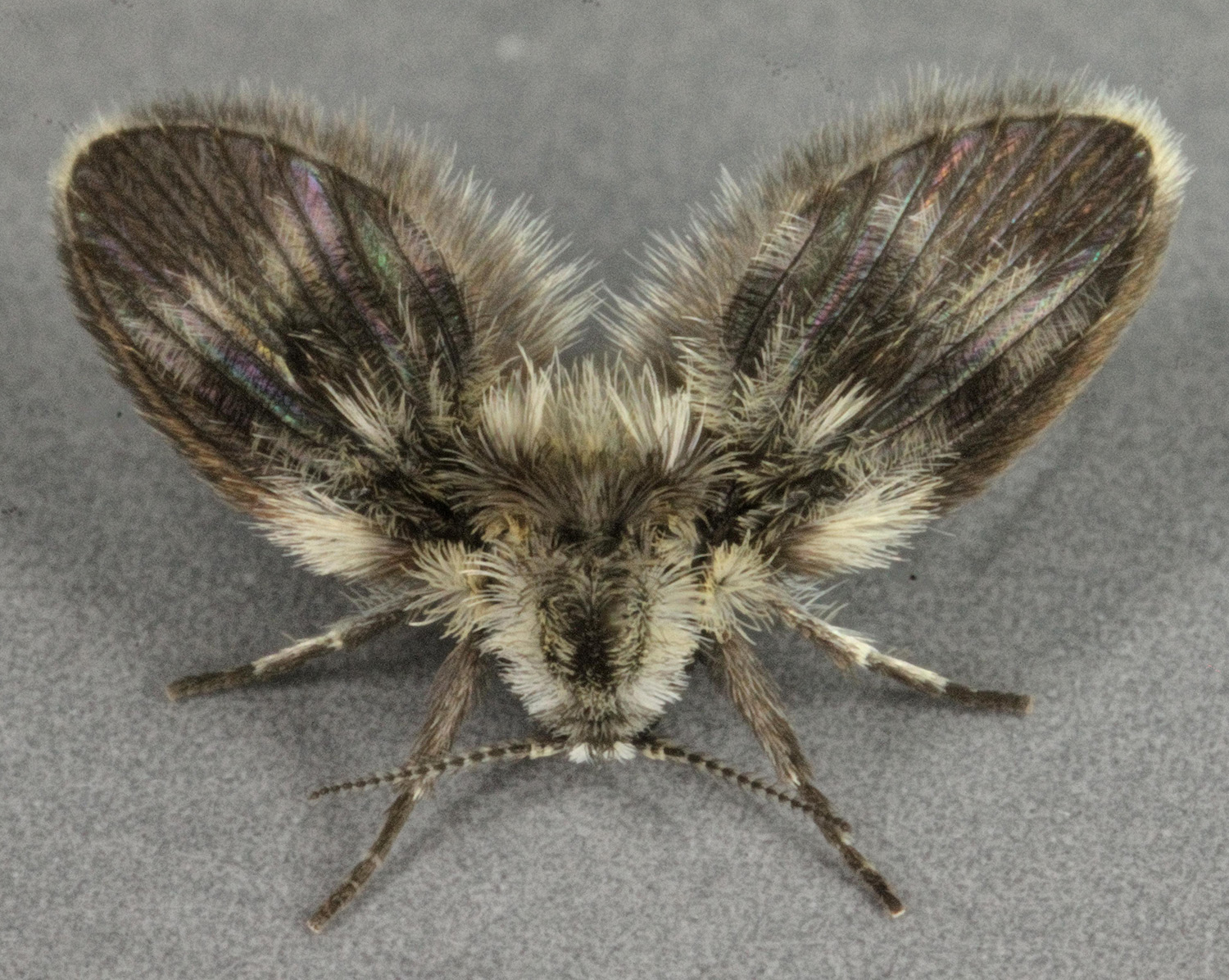
- Ulomyia fuliginosa North Wales

Scientific classification
- Domain: Eukaryota
- Kingdom: Animalia
- Phylum: Arthropoda
- Class: Insecta
- Order: Diptera
- Family: Psychodidae
- Genus: Ulomyia
- Species: U. fuliginosa

Binomial name
- Ulomyia fuliginosa (Meigen, 1818)

= Ulomyia fuliginosa =

Species of fly

Ulomyia fuliginosa is a species of fly in the family Psychodidae. It is found in the Palearctic.
