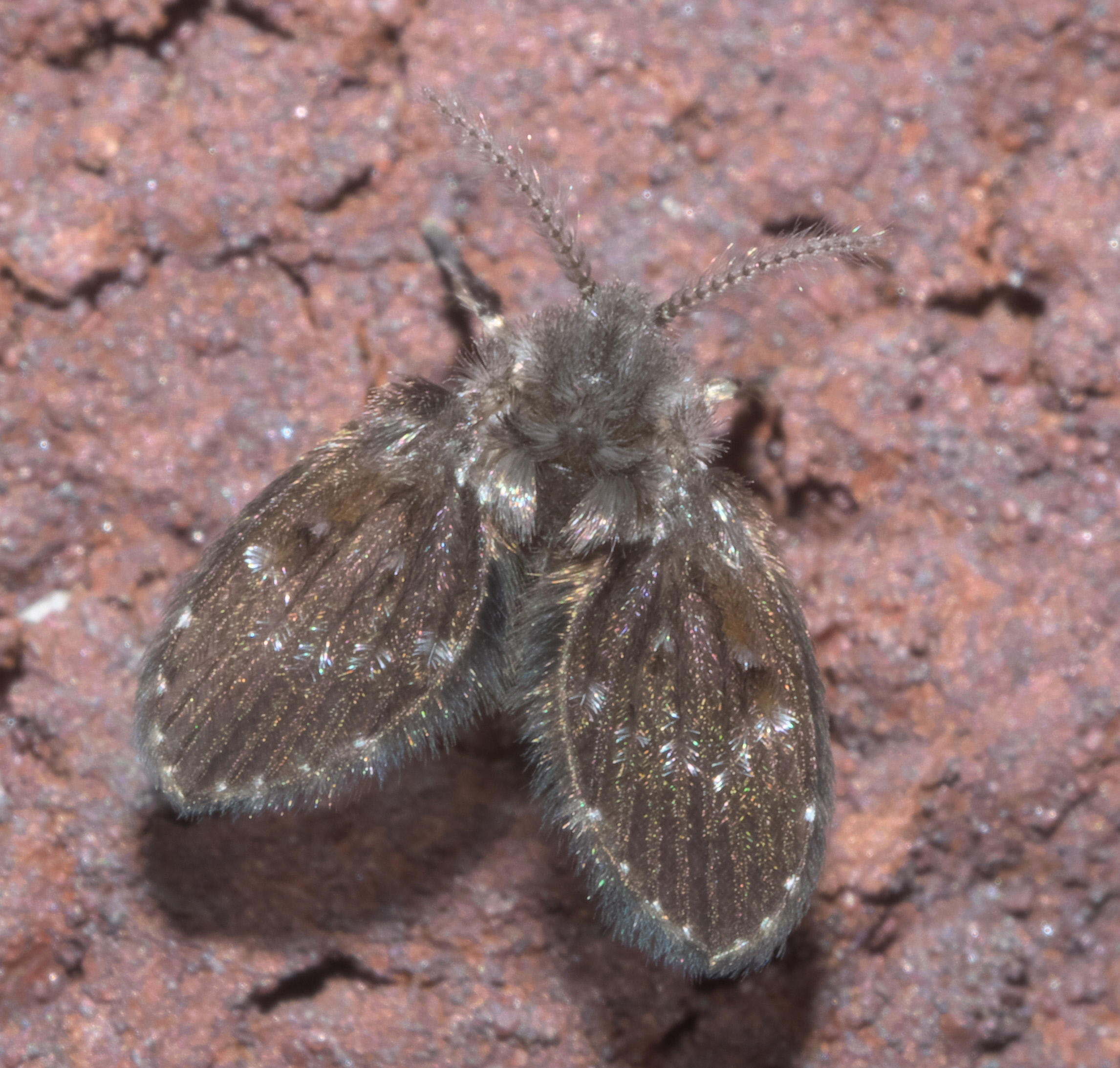
- Image of Clogmia albipunctata

Scientific classification
- Kingdom: Animalia
- Phylum: Arthropoda
- Clade: Pancrustacea
- Class: Insecta
- Order: Diptera
- Family: Psychodidae
- Subfamily: Psychodinae
- Tribe: Paramormiini
- Genus: Clogmia
- Species: C. albipunctata

Binomial name
- Clogmia albipunctata (Williston, 1893)

Synonyms
- Psychoda albipunctata Williston, 1893

= Clogmia albipunctata =

Species of fly

Clogmia albipunctata is a species of drain fly, a member of the family Psychodidae commonly known as the bathroom moth midge, bathroom moth fly or drain fly.

== Distribution ==
This very common species has a worldwide distribution in tropical and temperate areas and is often associated with humans. The species can be found near sewer drains, sewage treatment plants, plant pots, swamps and any other shaded place containing decaying, moist organic matter. The species is a common pest around household drains, but the larvae have an important role in sewage treatment.

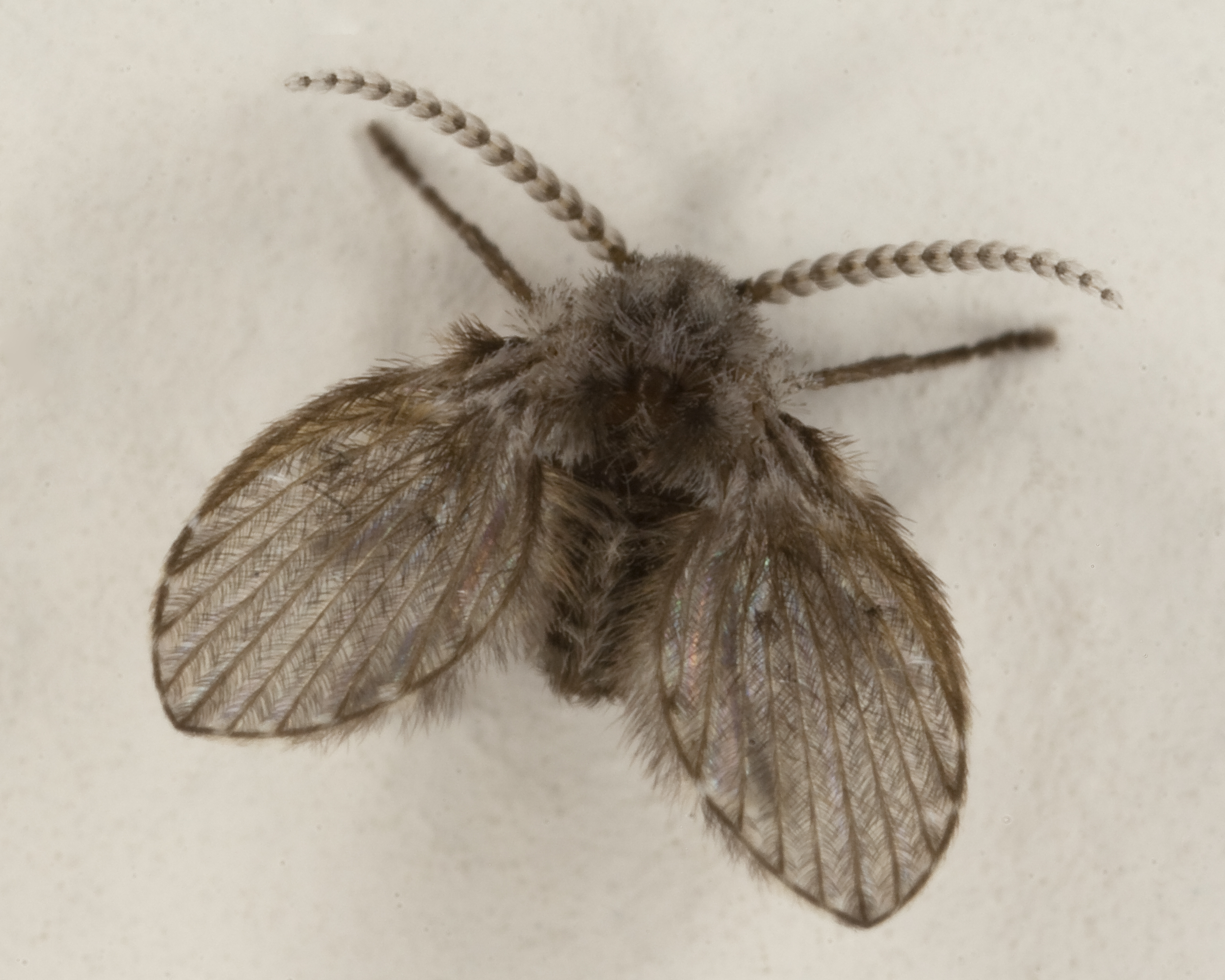
Male C. albipunctata. A moth-like dense coat of small hairs gives rise to the term "moth fly".

== Description ==
Clogmia albipunctata adults have broad wings covered with brownish and blackish hairs. There is a tuft of blackish hair near each wing vein fork and a tuft of white hair at the ends of most veins (i.e. each wing has a pair of black spots near the middle and several white spots along the edge). The thorax and abdomen are covered in gray/brownish-gray hairs. There is a pair of antennae which are longer than the abdomen and covered in white hairs. The legs are brown with white annuli (rings) at the tips of the tibiae and metatarsi.

The original species description gives a body length of 2.2 mm and a wing length of 2.2 mm. Later records show C. albipunctata can reach slightly greater sizes, such as a body length of 2.5 mm.

The species name, albipunctata, means "white-dotted", in reference to the white spots on the wings and appendages.

== Biology ==
The adults can sustain themselves by drinking water or consuming flower nectar and live for about 12 days. They spend most of their life perched on walls. They move rarely, and with weak flight. The larvae live in aquatic environments, feeding on organic decaying matter, and take about 18 days to turn into a pupa, which develops into an adult after 5 days.

Although they are considered harmless, some cases of myiasis caused by the larvae of this insect are reported in the literature, at the nasal, intestinal and urinary levels but are often associated with very poor sanitary conditions and bad hygiene habits.

== Pest control ==
Protected by the extremely fine water-repellent hairs covering their bodies, adults and larvae are difficult to drown, and are not affected by contact with most water-borne toxins such as bleach. Boiling water has little or no effect on the adults for the same reason, and even the eggs are highly resistant to both chemical or thermal assault. Eggs can also withstand periods of dehydration. Extermination of this household pest depends on the maintenance of clean household drains for a period of at least three weeks.

Suspect drains can be identified by placing a glass jar or taping a clear plastic bag over them, and periodically checking for adult flies. A clear plastic cup coated inside with vegetable oil or petroleum jelly can also be used. Partially covering the drain opening with sticky adhesive tape is another method used to identify breeding sources.

Thorough mechanical cleaning of drains will remove the larval food source, and is the most effective control measure. High-pressure drain cleaning will not only eradicate the feeding source of the larvae, it also cleans the entire length of pipe reducing the likelihood of drain flies from returning. Alternatively, injected foams containing bacteria or enzymes may be useful to break down gelatinous scum deposits. Besides sink drains, floor drains and shower drains are common sources, as well as leaky shower pans, but any location with moist decaying organic matter can be a breeding site. In commercial buildings, sump pump pits, sewers, and elevator pits may trap moisture where drain flies can breed.

Because of their attraction to light, drain flies may be monitored by using fan-based traps baited with visible or ultraviolet light. However, only killing adult flies is usually not effective; larval food sources must be removed to stop more flies from emerging.
