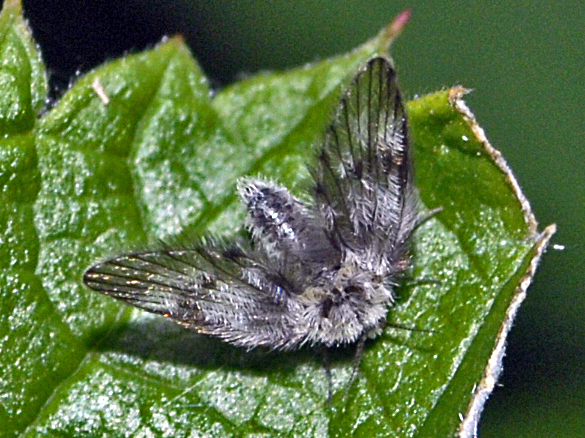
- Berdeniella species

Scientific classification
- Kingdom: Animalia
- Phylum: Arthropoda
- Class: Insecta
- Order: Diptera
- Family: Psychodidae
- Subfamily: Psychodinae
- Genus: Berdeniella; Vaillant, 1976

= Berdeniella =

Genus of flies

Berdeniella is a genus of drain flies in the subfamily Psychodinae.

== Species ==
Species within this genus include:

- Berdeniella alemannica
- Berdeniella alpina
- Berdeniella badukina
- Berdeniella belmontica
- Berdeniella betrandi
- Berdeniella bistricana
- Berdeniella bodoni
- Berdeniella boreonica
- Berdeniella brauxica
- Berdeniella bucegica
- Berdeniella calabricana
- Berdeniella cambuerina
- Berdeniella caprai
- Berdeniella carinthiaca
- Berdeniella caucasica
- Berdeniella chvojkai
- Berdeniella desnensis
- Berdeniella dispar
- Berdeniella elkeae
- Berdeniella fedilae
- Berdeniella freyi
- Berdeniella gardinii
- Berdeniella gereckei
- Berdeniella glacialis
- Berdeniella globulifera
- Berdeniella graeca
- Berdeniella granulosa
- Berdeniella gredosica
- Berdeniella hashemii
- Berdeniella helvetica
- Berdeniella hovassei
- Berdeniella huescana
- Berdeniella illiesi
- Berdeniella incisa
- Berdeniella jahoriensis
- Berdeniella jaramensis
- Berdeniella jezeki
- Berdeniella julianensis
- Berdeniella kocii
- Berdeniella longispinosa
- Berdeniella lucasii
- Berdeniella lucasioides
- Berdeniella magniseta
- Berdeniella manicata
- Berdeniella matthesi
- Berdeniella nevadensis
- Berdeniella nivalis
- Berdeniella ordesica
- Berdeniella pyrenaica
- Berdeniella ramosa
- Berdeniella salamannai
- Berdeniella sardoa
- Berdeniella schumpkanica
- Berdeniella sievecki
- Berdeniella stavniensis
- Berdeniella thermalis
- Berdeniella thomasi
- Berdeniella tuberosa
- Berdeniella unispinosa
- Berdeniella vaillanti
- Berdeniella vanosica
- Berdeniella vimmeri
- Berdeniella zoiai
- Berdeniella zwicki
