= Limnophyes paludis =

Scientific classification
- Domain: Eukaryota
- Kingdom: Animalia
- Phylum: Arthropoda
- Class: Insecta
- Order: Diptera
- Family: Chironomidae
- Genus: Limnophyes
- Species: L. paludis

Binomial name
- Limnophyes paludis Armitage, 1985

Species of fly

Limnophyes paludis is a species of fly belonging to the family Chironomidae (non-biting midges). This is a relatively large dark brown midge (total length up to 3.3 mm) with distinctive lanceolate setae on the thorax. Originally discovered on emergent vegetation in The Swale National Nature Reserve, Kent, England, it has since been recorded in other parts of northwest Europe.
