= Telmatoscopus =

Scientific classification
- Domain: Eukaryota
- Kingdom: Animalia
- Phylum: Arthropoda
- Class: Insecta
- Order: Diptera
- Family: Psychodidae
- Tribe: Paramormiini
- Genus: Telmatoscopus; Eaton, 1904

Genus of flies

Telmatoscopus is a genus of flies belonging to the family Psychodidae.

The genus has cosmopolitan distribution.

Species:

- Telmatoscopus aberrans Tonnoir, 1953
- Telmatoscopus acrobeles Quate & Quate, 1967
