= Eremolobulosa =

Scientific classification
- Kingdom: Animalia
- Phylum: Arthropoda
- Clade: Pancrustacea
- Class: Insecta
- Order: Diptera
- Family: Psychodidae
- Subfamily: Psychodinae
- Tribe: Maruinini
- Genus: Eremolobulosa; Duckhouse, 1990

Type species
- Eremolobulosa tropicalis Duckhouse, 1990

Genus of flies

Eremolobulosa is a genus of drain flies in the subfamily Psychodinae.

== Distribution ==
Northern Territory.

== Species ==
- Eremolobulosa tropicalis Duckhouse, 1990
