= Lepimormia =

Scientific classification
- Kingdom: Animalia
- Phylum: Arthropoda
- Clade: Pancrustacea
- Class: Insecta
- Order: Diptera
- Family: Psychodidae
- Genus: Lepimormia; Enderlein, 1935

Genus of flies

Lepimormia is a genus of flies belonging to the family Psychodidae.

Species:

- Lepimormia hemiboreale Salmela & Piirainen, 2005
- Lepimormia hemiborealis Salmela & Piirainen, 2005
