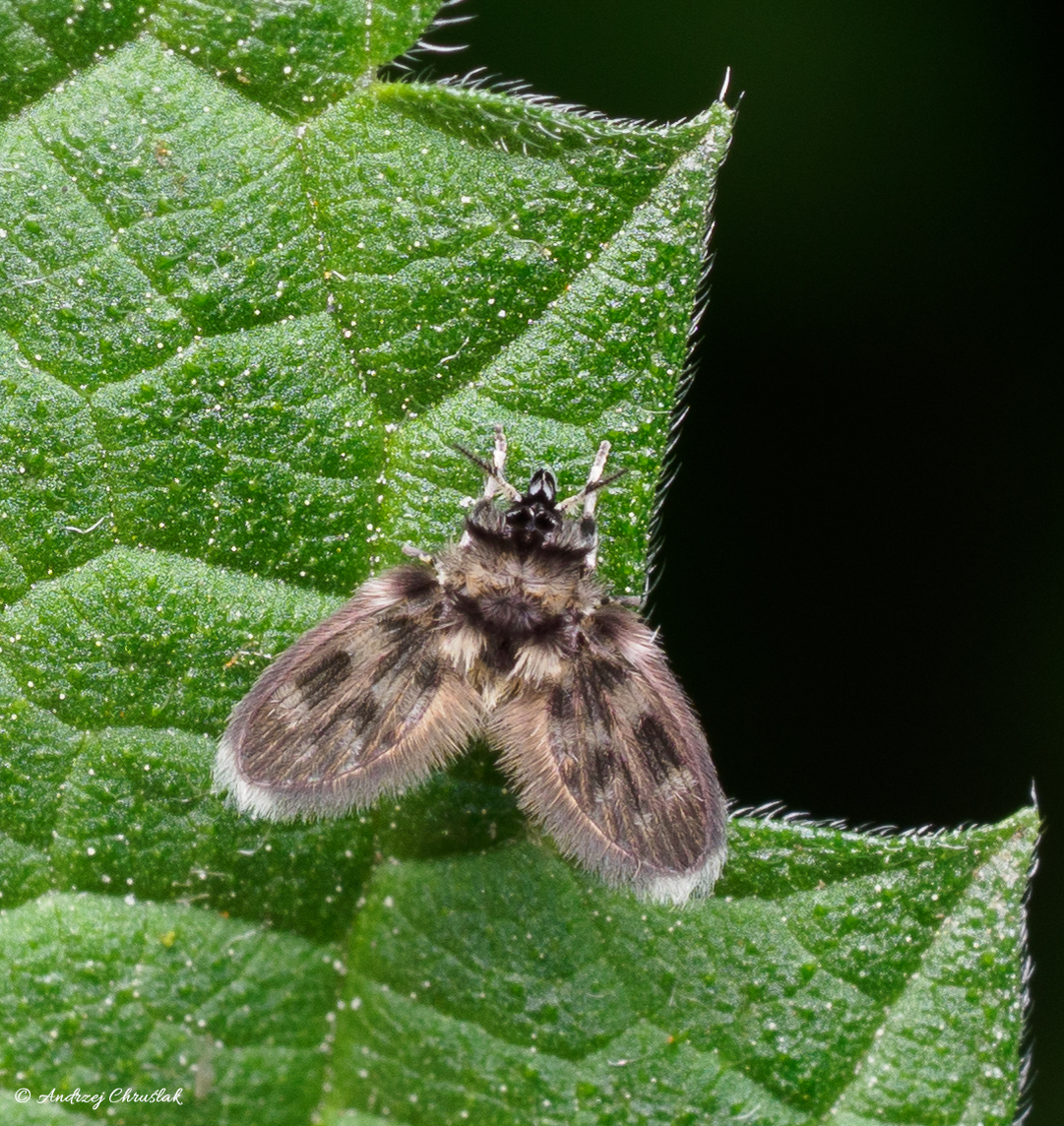
- male Pneumia nubila, Poland

Scientific classification
- Kingdom: Animalia
- Phylum: Arthropoda
- Clade: Pancrustacea
- Class: Insecta
- Order: Diptera
- Family: Psychodidae
- Subfamily: Psychodinae
- Tribe: Pericomini
- Genus: Pneumia; Enderlein, 1935

Synonyms
- Satchelliella Enderlein, 1935

= Pneumia =

Genus of moth-flies

Pneumia is a genus of moth-flies in the family Psychodidae. There are more than 60 described species in Pneumia. Satchelliella is a junior synonym.

== Species ==
These 67 species belong to the genus Pneumia:

- Pneumia ariegica (Vaillant, 1963)
- Pneumia arvernica (Vaillant, 1979)
- Pneumia balcanica (Krek, 1990)
- Pneumia borealis (Berdén, 1954)
- Pneumia bosniaca (Krek, 1990)
- Pneumia bucegiana (Vaillant, 1981)
- Pneumia bugeciana (Vaillant, 1981) Invalid name, spelling error.
- Pneumia californica (Kincaid, 1901)
- Pneumia canariensis (Tonnoir, 1922)
- Pneumia canescens (Meigen, 1804)
- Pneumia compta (Eaton, 1893)
- Pneumia cubitospinosa (Jung, 1954)
- Pneumia delphiniensis (Georges, 1964)
- Pneumia dinarica (Krek, 1990)
- Pneumia dissimilis (Krek, 1972)
- Pneumia distincta (Krek, 1982)
- Pneumia extricata (Eaton, 1893)
- Pneumia fonticola (Szabó, 1960)
- Pneumia fuehzulii Ježek, Oboňa & Manko, 2022
- Pneumia gracilis (Eaton, 1893)
- Pneumia hellenica (Vaillant, 1979)
- Pneumia hirticornis (Tonnoir, 1922)
- Pneumia incurvata (Krek, 1984)
- Pneumia inflata (Sarà, 1953)
- Pneumia isabellae (Wagner, 2005)
- Pneumia joosti (Wagner, 1981)
- Pneumia jungi (Vaillant, 1961)
- Pneumia kabelaki Omelková & Ježek, 2012
- Pneumia kandavanica (Ježek, 1990)
- Pneumia longistylis (Mirouse, 1960)
- Pneumia malickyi (Vaillant, 1981)
- Pneumia marinkovici (Krek, 1967)
- Pneumia mitsuhiroi Ježek, 2004
- Pneumia mladeni Ježek & Oboňa, 2019
- Pneumia montenegrina (Krek, 1990)
- Pneumia mutua (Eaton, 1893)
- Pneumia narsanica (Vaillant & Joost, 1983)
- Pneumia nubila (Meigen, 1818)
- Pneumia omogoensis (Tokunaga & Komyo, 1955)
- Pneumia opaca (Tonnoir, 1922)
- Pneumia palustris (Meigen, 1804)
- Pneumia pellucida Wagner, 2013
- Pneumia piluaria (Krek, 1974)
- Pneumia pilularia (Tonnoir, 1940)
- Pneumia plumicornis (Tonnoir, 1922)
- Pneumia portuguesa Wagner, Andrade & Gonsalves, 2022
- Pneumia propinqua (Satchell, 1955)
- Pneumia puluaria (Krek, 1974)
- Pneumia pyrenaica (Vaillant, 1981)
- Pneumia reghayana (Boumezzough & Vaillant, 1986)
- Pneumia sanae (Krek, 1990)
- Pneumia sandaliae (Salamanna, 1983)
- Pneumia schachti (Wagner, 1986)
- Pneumia scotiae (Curran, 1924)
- Pneumia stammeri (Jung, 1954)
- Pneumia stylata (Vaillant, 1973)
- Pneumia sziladyi (Szabó, 1960)
- Pneumia tallax (Krek, 1974)
- Pneumia tarae (Krek, 1985)
- Pneumia thomasi (Vaillant, 1967)
- Pneumia tjentistensis (Krek, 1969)
- Pneumia toubkalensis Omelková & Ježek, 2012
- Pneumia trivialis (Eaton, 1893)
- Pneumia ussurica (Wagner, 1994)
- Pneumia vaillanti (Wagner, 1981)
- Pneumia vandeli (Mirouse, 1960)
- Pneumia vittata (Tonnoir, 1919)
