= Limnophyes er =

Scientific classification
- Domain: Eukaryota
- Kingdom: Animalia
- Phylum: Arthropoda
- Class: Insecta
- Order: Diptera
- Family: Chironomidae
- Genus: Limnophyes
- Species: L. er

Binomial name
- Limnophyes er Sæther, 1985

Species of fly

Limnophyes er is a species of chironomid midge found in Scandinavia and European Russia. This is a distinctive species, both sexes are very dark in colour, the body appearing almost black with darkened wings. The specific epithet er means 'hedgehog' in Latin and refers to the notable setae on the body.
