= Limnophyes angelicae =

Scientific classification
- Domain: Eukaryota
- Kingdom: Animalia
- Phylum: Arthropoda
- Class: Insecta
- Order: Diptera
- Family: Chironomidae
- Genus: Limnophyes
- Species: L. angelicae

Binomial name
- Limnophyes angelicae Sæther, 1990

Species of fly

Limnophyes angelicae is a species of dark brown chironomid midge. It has been recorded in the British Isles, Germany and European Russia and is assumed to be widespread in Europe.

Unlike many Limnophyes species, in which the larvae live in semiaquatic or damp terrestrial habitats, the larvae of L. angelicae are fully aquatic, living in shallow water at the margins of lakes.
