= Alloeodidicrum =

Scientific classification
- Kingdom: Animalia
- Phylum: Arthropoda
- Class: Insecta
- Order: Diptera
- Family: Psychodidae
- Subfamily: Psychodinae
- Tribe: Maruinini
- Genus: Alloeodidicrum; Duckhouse, 1990

Type species
- Alloeodidicrum eungellae Duckhouse, 1990

Genus of flies

Alloeodidicrum is a genus of drain flies in the subfamily Psychodinae. It consists of two species.

== Species ==
- Alloeodidicrum eungellae Duckhouse, 1990, the type species.
- Alloeodidicrum confusa (Satchell, 1953)
