= Trichomyia lengleti =

Trichomyia lengleti Temporal range: Cretaceous

Scientific classification
- Kingdom: Animalia
- Phylum: Arthropoda
- Class: Insecta
- Order: Diptera
- Family: Psychodidae
- Genus: Trichomyia
- Species: †T. lengleti

Binomial name
- †Trichomyia lengleti Lak et al., 2008

Extinct species of fly

Trichomyia lengleti is an extinct species of Cretaceous fly found in the Charentes region of France.

It was discovered in 2008 when x-ray technology was used to peer into opaque pieces of amber.
