= Trichopsychoda =

Scientific classification
- Domain: Eukaryota
- Kingdom: Animalia
- Phylum: Arthropoda
- Class: Insecta
- Order: Diptera
- Family: Psychodidae
- Genus: Trichopsychoda; Tonnoir, 1922

Genus of flies

Trichopsychoda is a genus of flies belonging to the family Psychodidae.

The species of this genus are found in Europe and Northern America.

Species:

- Trichopsychoda africanus Satchell, 1955
- Trichopsychoda arunaudi Tokunaga, 1961
