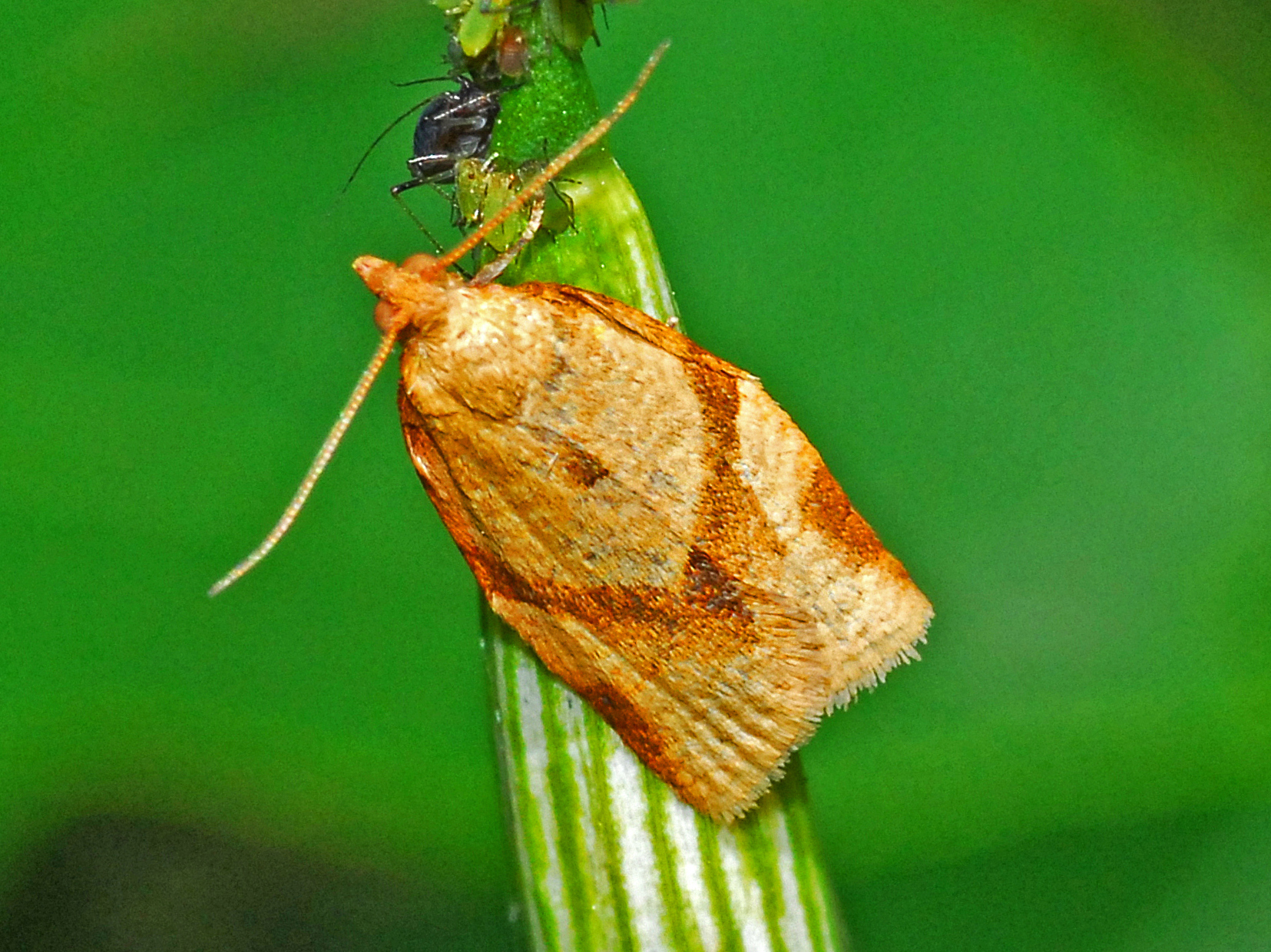
- Clepsis consimilana. Male
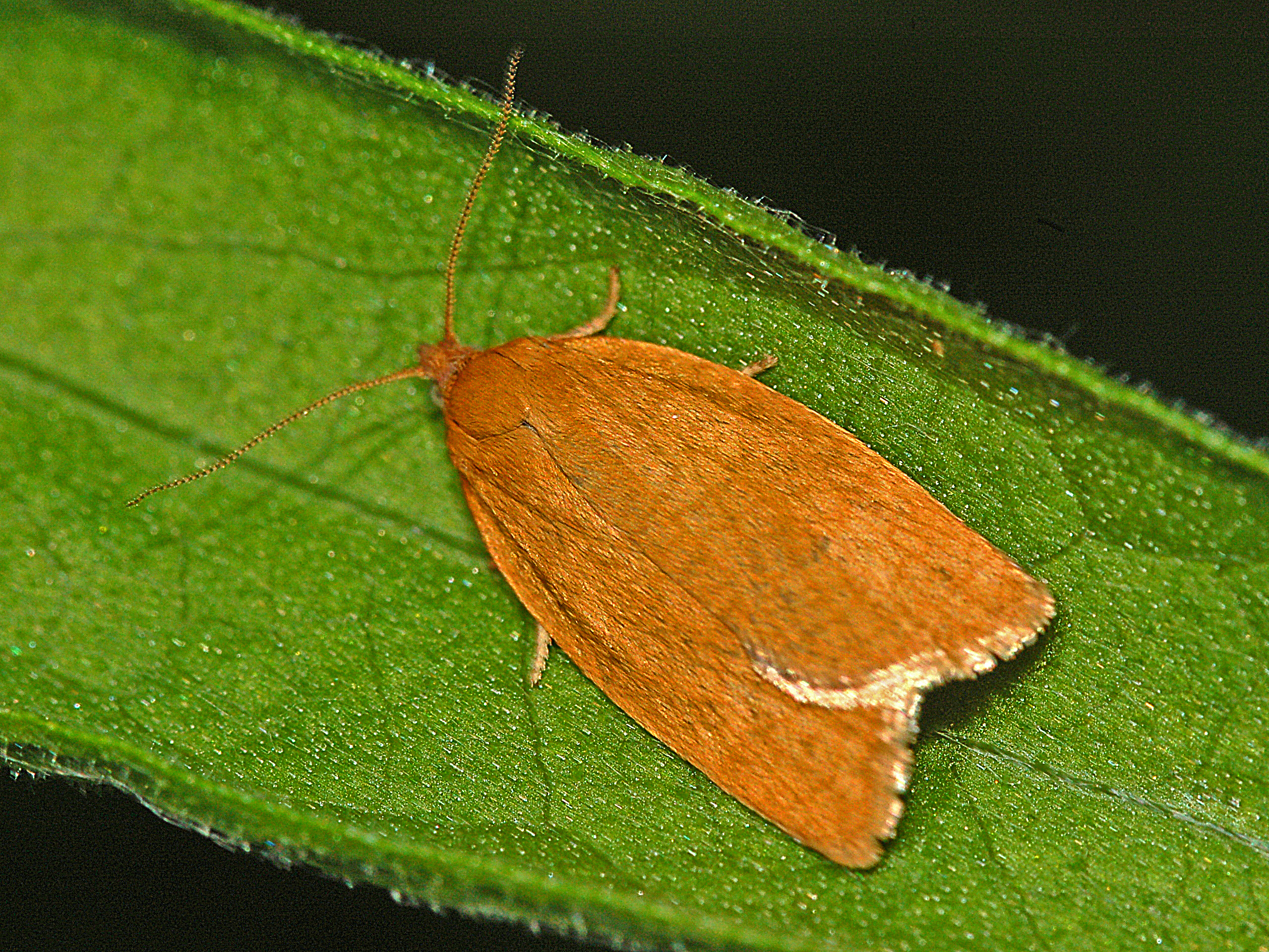
- Female

Scientific classification
- Kingdom: Animalia
- Phylum: Arthropoda
- Clade: Pancrustacea
- Class: Insecta
- Order: Lepidoptera
- Family: Tortricidae
- Genus: Clepsis
- Species: C. consimilana

Binomial name
- Clepsis consimilana (Hübner, [1814-1817])

= Clepsis consimilana =

Species of moth

Clepsis consimilana, the privet tortrix, is a moth of the family Tortricidae.

== Synonyms ==
- Tortrix consimilana Hubner, [1814-1817]
- Cacoecia acclivana Zerny, 1933
- Tortrix unifasciana f. cinnamomena Dufrane, 1957
- Tortrix eatoniana Ragonot, 1881
- Tortrix fallaciana Fuchs, 1903
- Tortrix unifascina f. fuscana Dufrane, 1957
- Tortrix unifasciana f. obliterana Dufrane, 1957
- Tortix obliterana Herrich-Schaffer, 1847
- Tortrix (Lozotaenia) obliterana Herrich-Schaffer, 1851
- Pandemis peregrinana Stephens, 1852
- Siclobola placida Diakonoff, 1948
- Tortrix productana Zeller, 1847
- Cacoecia unifasciana var. semiana Chretien, 1915
- Tortrix unifasciana Duponchel, in Godart, 1842

== Distribution ==
This species is present from Europe to Asia Minor and Syria, it is also found in North Africa and the eastern United States.

== Description ==
Clepsis consimilana has a wingspan of 13–19 mm. The forewings are reddish-brown, with dark brown markings and two small dark spots on the hind edge. The females are more indistinctly marked on the forewings than the males. Hindwings are brownish grey. Larvae are violet green or violet grey, with pale brown head.

== Biology ==
Adults are on wing from June to September. They are active in afternoon and evening, and comes to light. The larvae feed on various trees, including Ligustrum species. They apparently prefer dead leaves. Other recorded food plants include Syringa, Hedera, Lonicera, Polygonum, Malus, Carpinus, Crataegus and Cotoneaster species. Pupation occurs in the larval feeding place. In September usually a partial second generation takes place and in the third instar these moths hibernate.

== Gallery ==
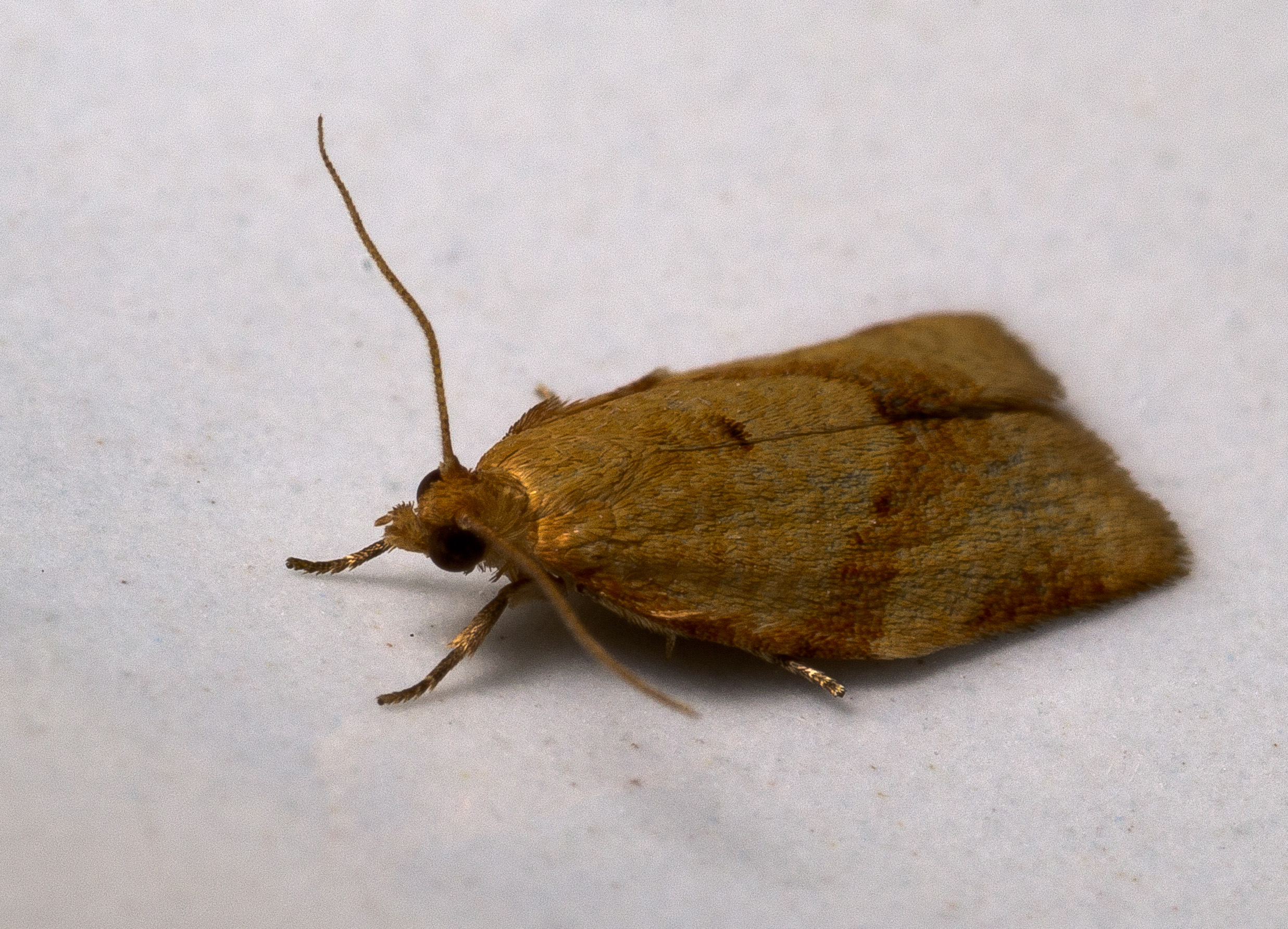

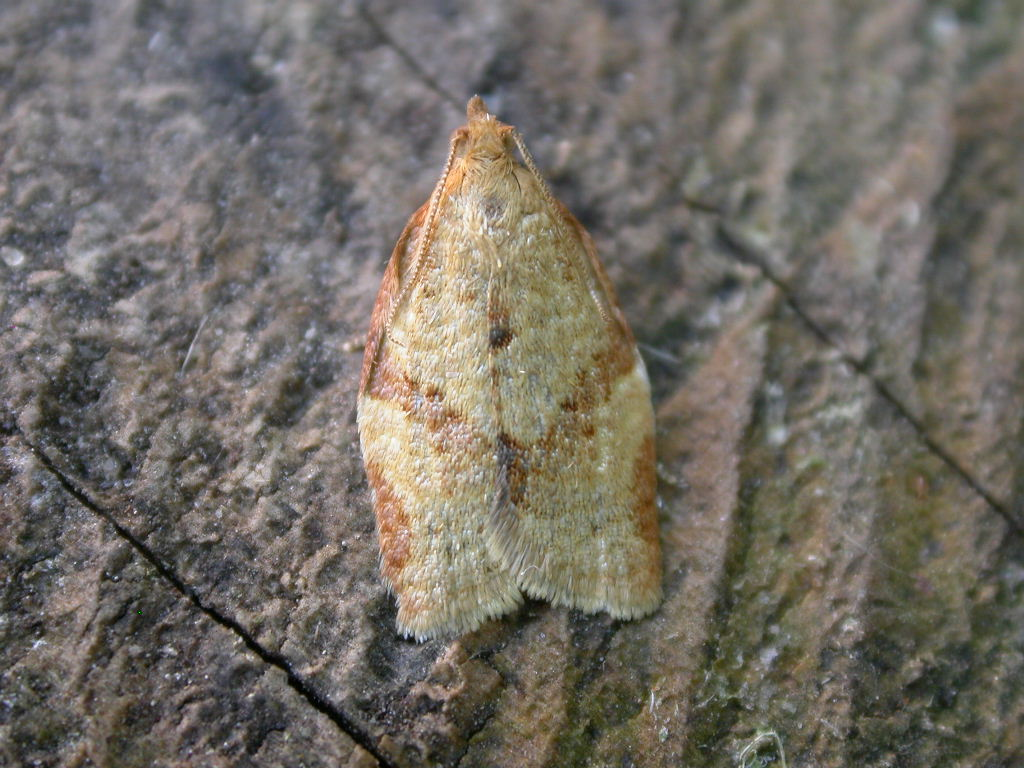

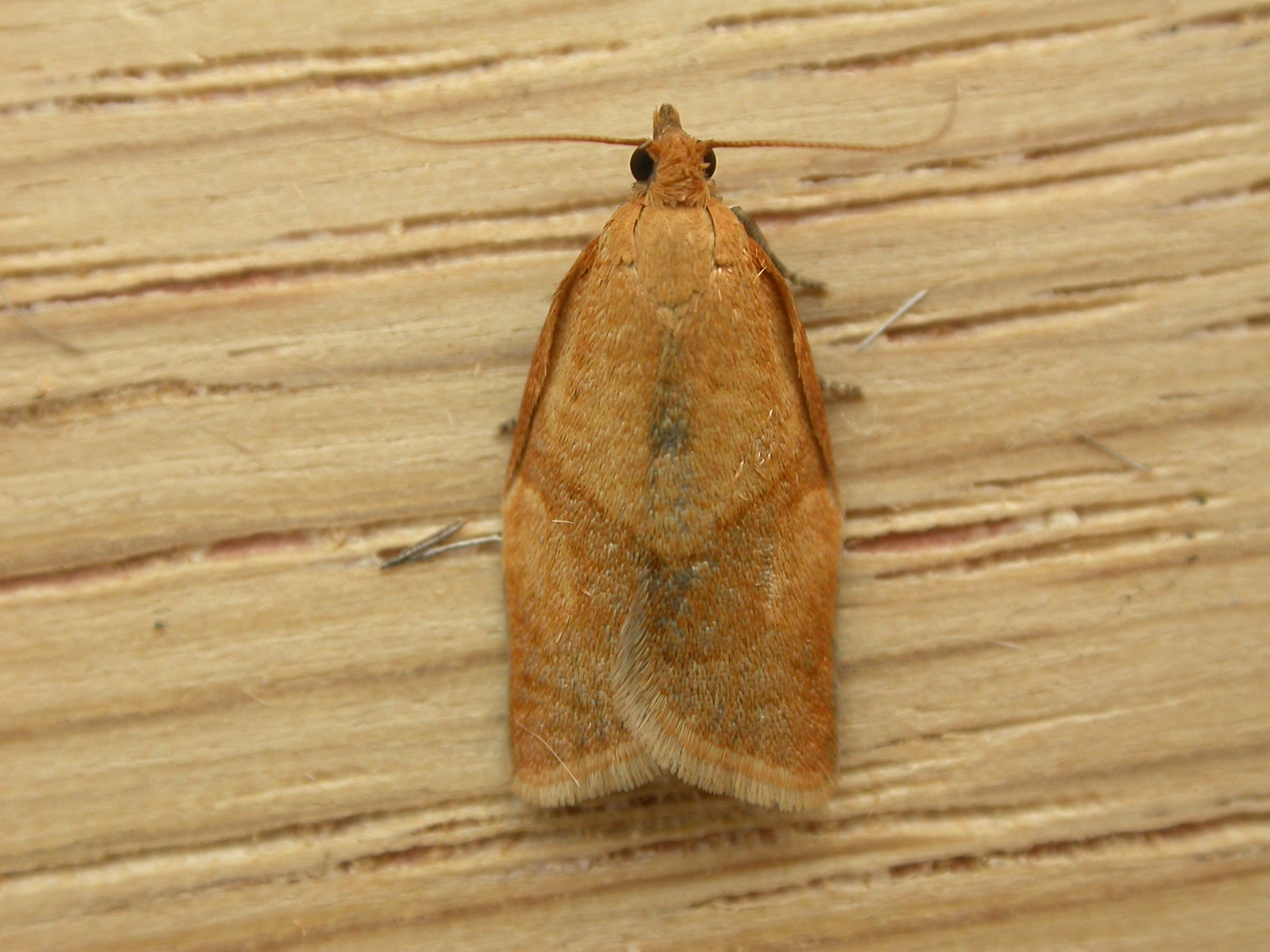
