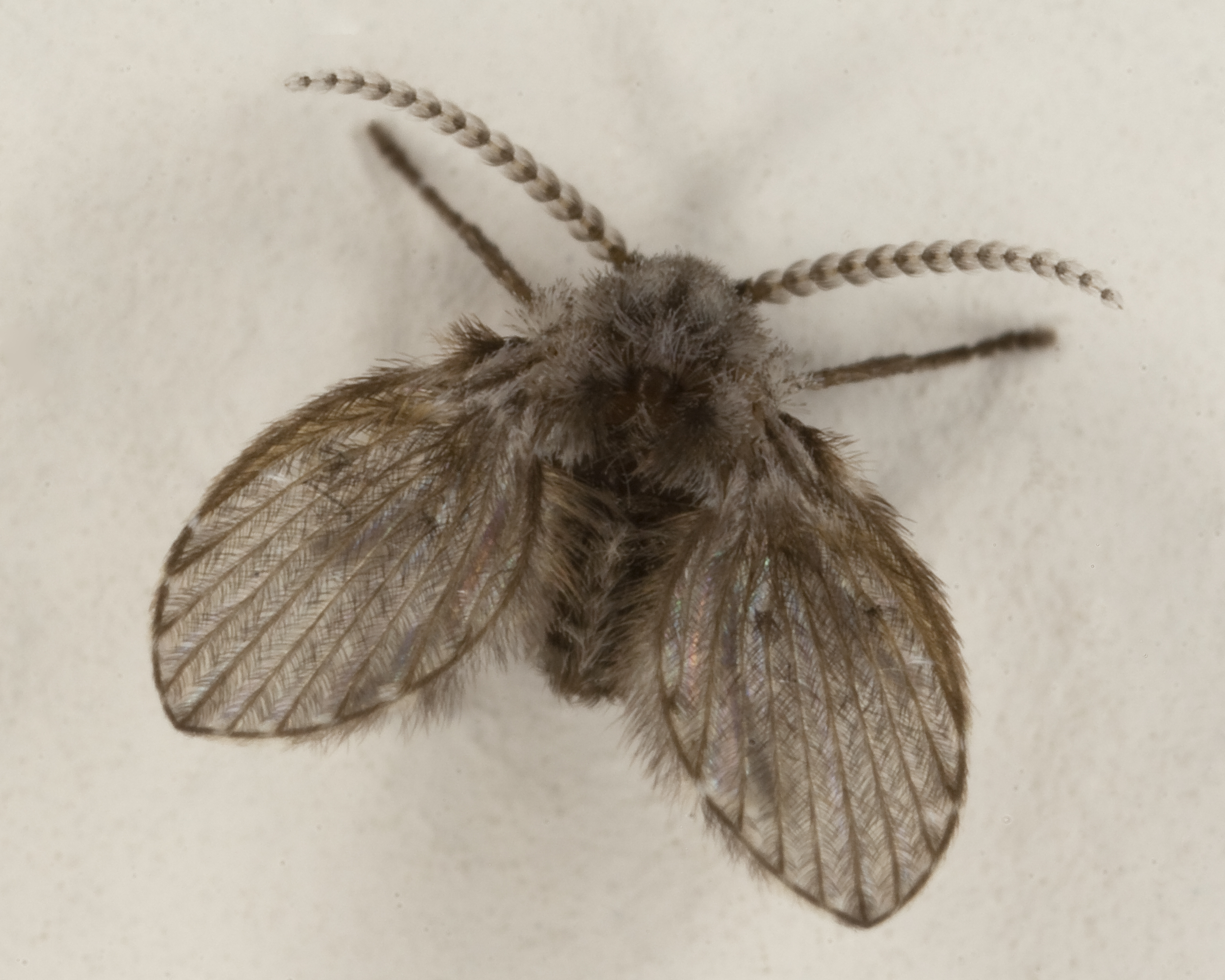
- Male Clogmia albipunctata. A moth-like dense coat of small hairs gives rise to the term "moth fly".

Scientific classification
- Kingdom: Animalia
- Phylum: Arthropoda
- Clade: Pancrustacea
- Class: Insecta
- Order: Diptera
- Suborder: Nematocera
- Infraorder: Psychodomorpha
- Superfamily: Psychodoidea
- Family: Psychodidae; Newman, 1834

Synonyms
- Phlebotomidae

= Psychodidae =

Psychodidae Temporal range: Norian–Present

Family of flies

Psychodidae, common name moth flies, is a family of true flies. Many genera have short, hairy bodies and wings, giving them a "furry" moth-like appearance, hence one of their common names, moth flies. They are also called drain flies, sink flies, filter flies, sewer flies, or sewer gnats because a few species live in drains. Members of the sub-family Phlebotominae, which are hematophagous (feeding on blood), may be called sand flies in some countries, although this term is also used for other unrelated flies, such as horse flies (Tabanidae) and no-see-ums (Ceratopogonidae).

There are more than 2,600 described species worldwide, most of them native to the humid tropics. This makes them one of the most diverse families of their order. Drain flies sometimes inhabit plumbing drains and sewage systems, where they are harmless, but may be a persistent annoyance.

== Life cycle ==
Live drain fly larvae

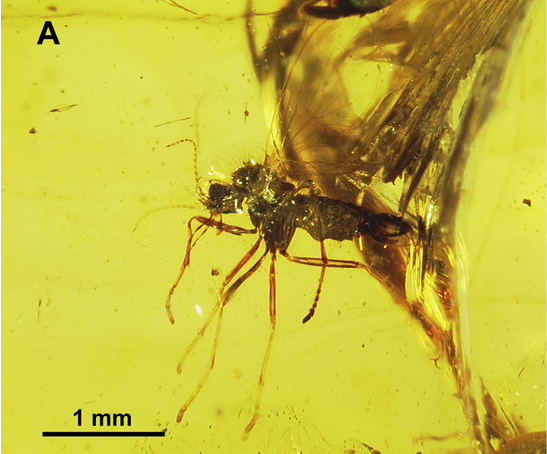
Datzia bispina holotype in Burmese amber

The larvae of the subfamilies Psychodinae, Sycoracinae and Horaiellinae live in aquatic to semi-terrestrial or sludge-based habitats, including bathroom sinks, where they feed on bacteria and can become problematic. The larvae of the most commonly encountered species are nearly transparent with a non-retractable black head and can sometimes be seen moving along the moist edges of crevices in shower stalls or bathtubs or submerged in toilet water. The larval form of the fly is usually between 4 and 5 mm (0.16 and 0.20 in) long, and is shaped like a long, thin, somewhat flattened cylinder. The body lacks prolegs, but the body segments are divided into a series of rings called annuli (singular is annulus). Some of these rings will have characteristic plates on the dorsal side. The larval thorax is not significantly larger than the abdomen, giving the larvae a more "worm-like" appearance than those of most aquatic insects.

In some species, the larvae can secure themselves to surfaces of their environment using "attachment disks" on their ventral side. Like mosquito larvae, they cannot absorb oxygen through water, and instead breathe via a small dark tube (a spiracle) on their posterior end — they must regularly reach the surface to obtain oxygen. The larval stage lasts for between 9 and 15 days, depending on species, temperature, and environment. There are four instar stages. In small numbers, the larvae are sometimes considered beneficial, as their strong jaws can cut through the hair and sludge waste in drains which might otherwise form clogs. However, unless this sludge layer is removed entirely, the adult flies will continue to find it and lay more eggs.

While the biting midges also have larvae that have no prolegs and which also have attachment disks, the larvae of the netwinged midges can be distinguished from those of the moth fly by the multiple deep lateral constrictions of the latter.

The pupal stage lasts between 20 and 40 hours. During this stage, the insect does not feed, but stays submerged near the water surface, still breathing through a spiracle, and soon metamorphoses into an adult fly, which bursts through a seam in the pupal casing and emerges onto the water's surface.

The adults are half as long as the larvae, but are much broader in appearance, with a pair of hairy wings held pitched-roof-like over the body. The wings have the most elementary venation of any of the Diptera, having little more than a series of parallel veins without crossveins.

The adults are typically nocturnal, though they orient themselves around lights and may appear to be attracted to light and odors. They are erratic fliers, and are often seen walking or running rapidly as well as taking flight. They are most active at night, but may also be seen during daylight, or near windows, lights, or illuminated display panels.

The adults live for about 20 days, during which they will breed only once, often within hours of emerging from their pupal casings. Females will lay their eggs (between 30 and 100) just above the water line inside moist drains. Within 48 hours these eggs hatch into drain worms, the larval form.

Psychodidae SEM top view

Psychodidae SEM rear view

Psychodidae SEM view from left

high resolution SEM image of Psychodidae (drain- or moth flies), front view

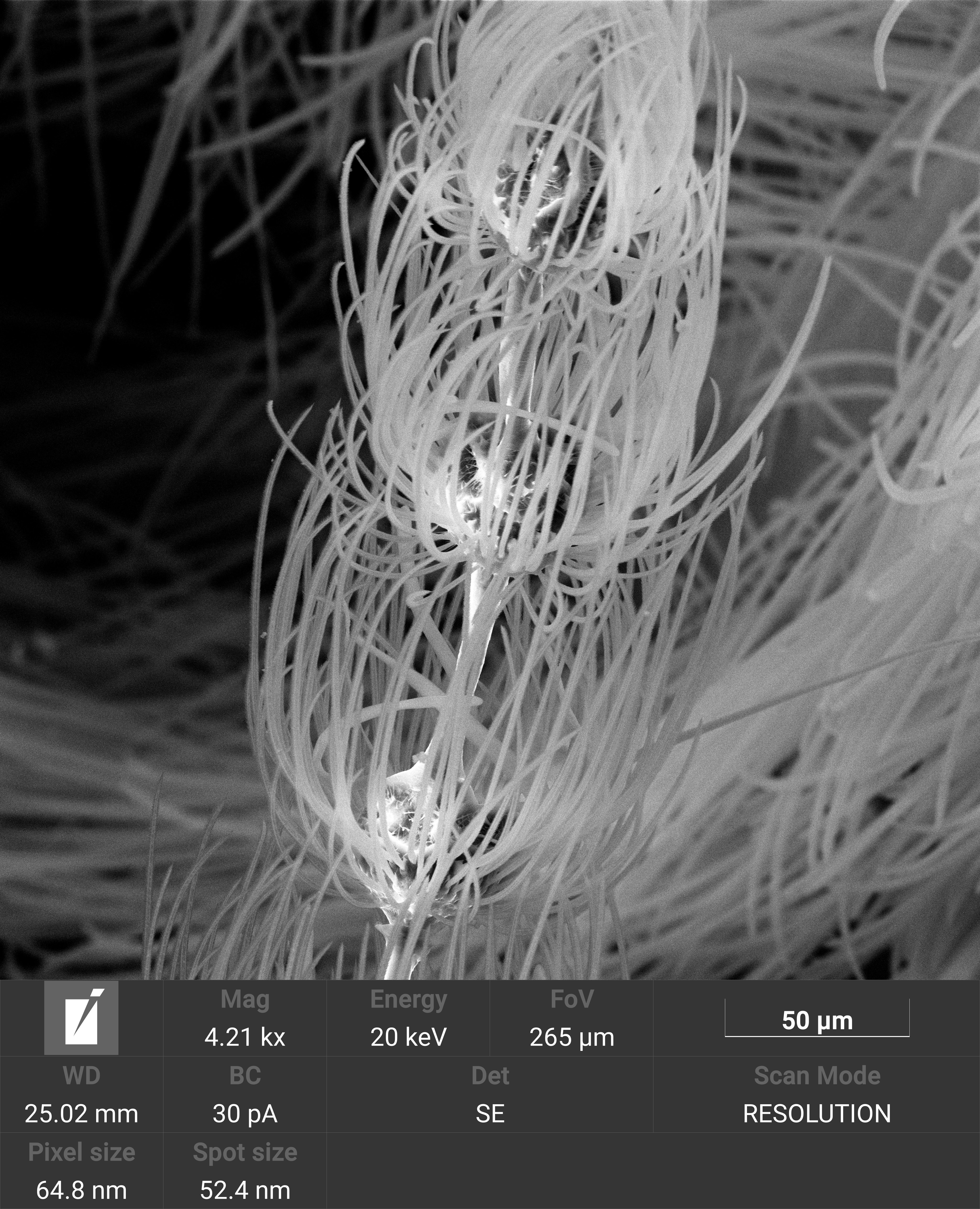
high resolution SEM image of Psychodidae (drain- or moth flies) whiskers segments

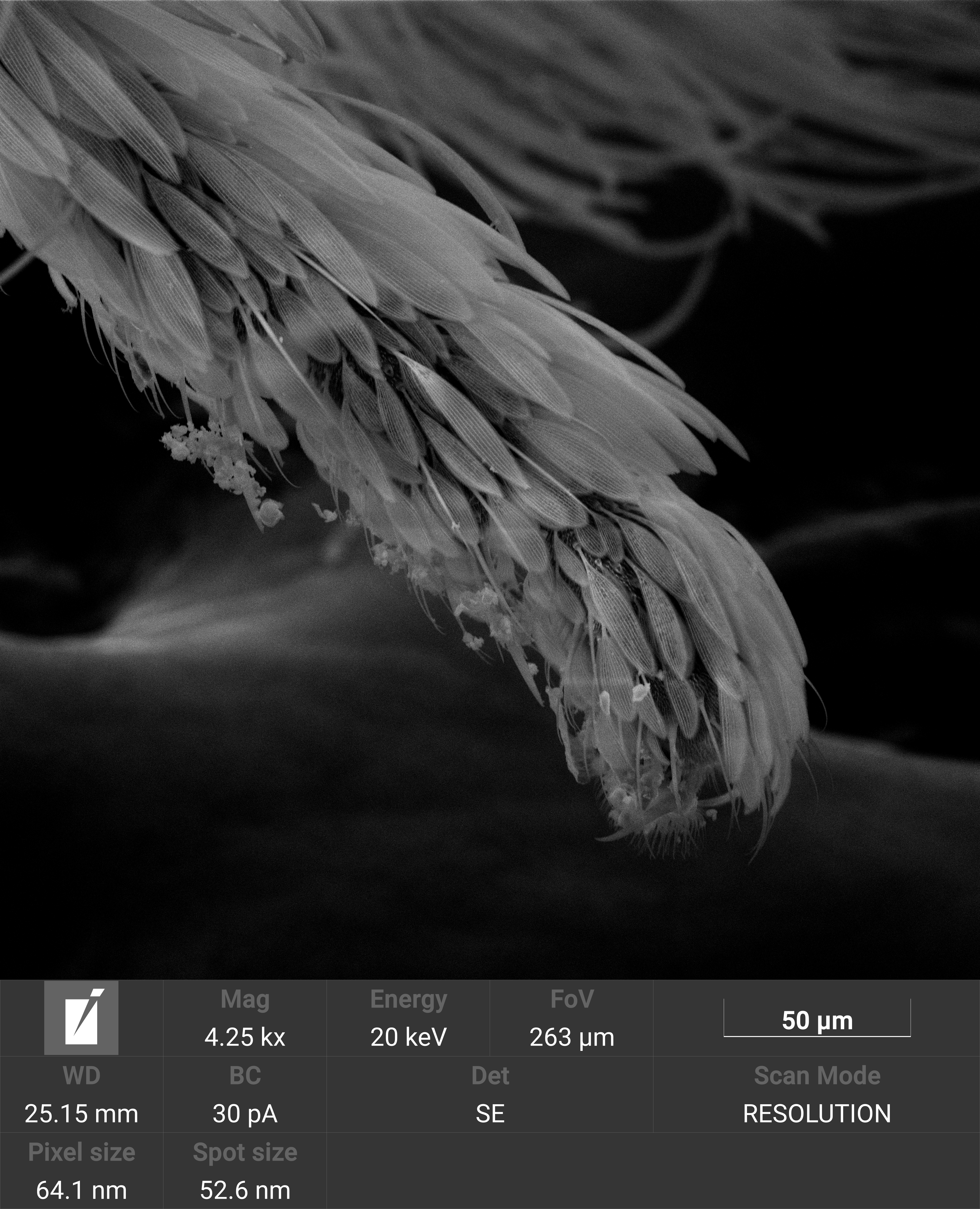
high resolution SEM image of Psychodidae (drain- or moth flies) leg

== Health effects ==
The drain flies which are commonly found in bathrooms, Clogmia albipunctata, are not known to carry any human diseases, but have been known to be an opportunistic agent of myiasis. However, the subfamily of Phlebotominae does feed on blood with the ability to transmit (tropical) diseases, and Sycorax silacea can transmit microfilaria. Inhalation of insect fragments may cause asthma.

== Taxonomy ==
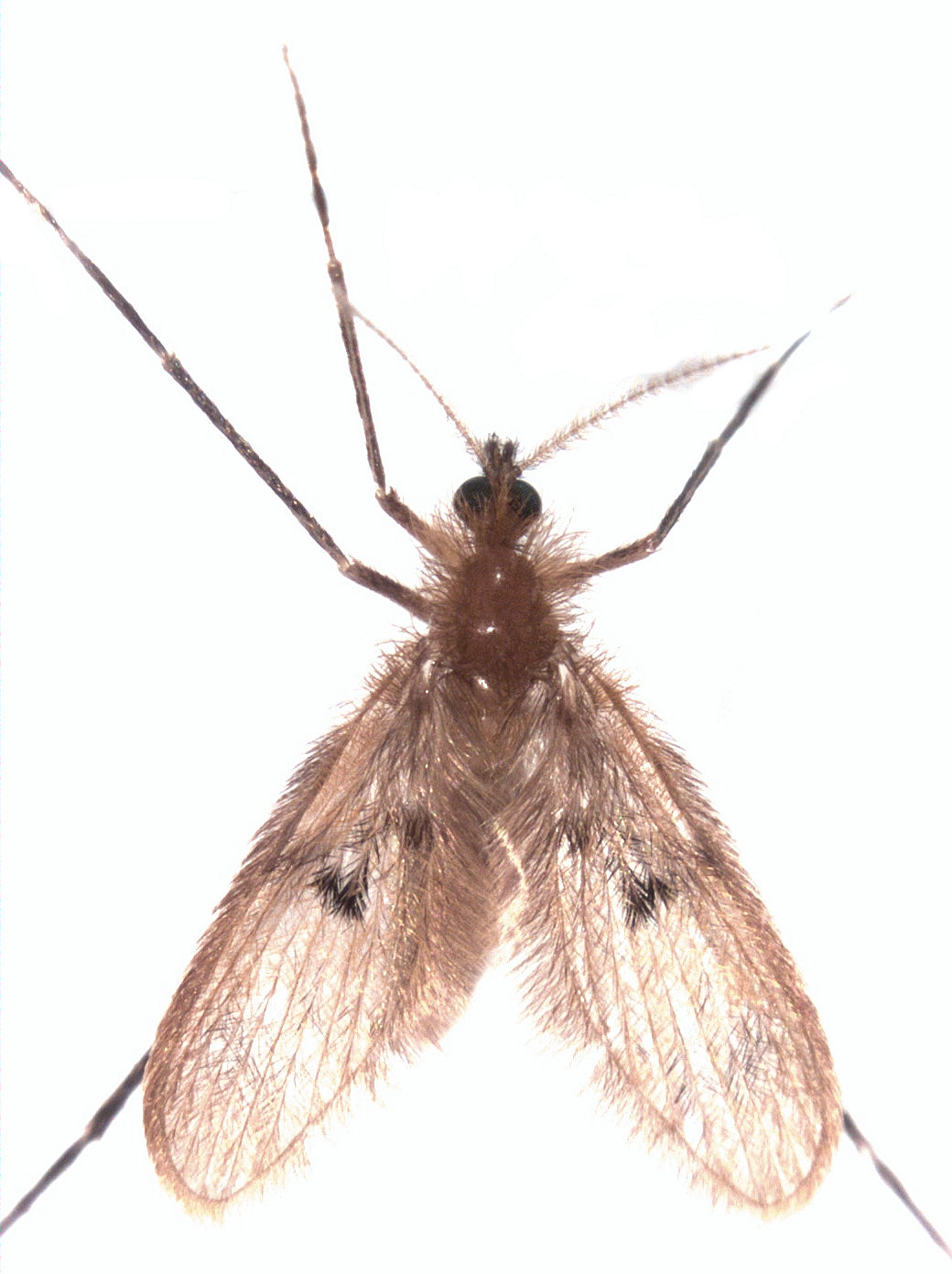
Notofairchildia zelandiae (previously in Nemopalpus)

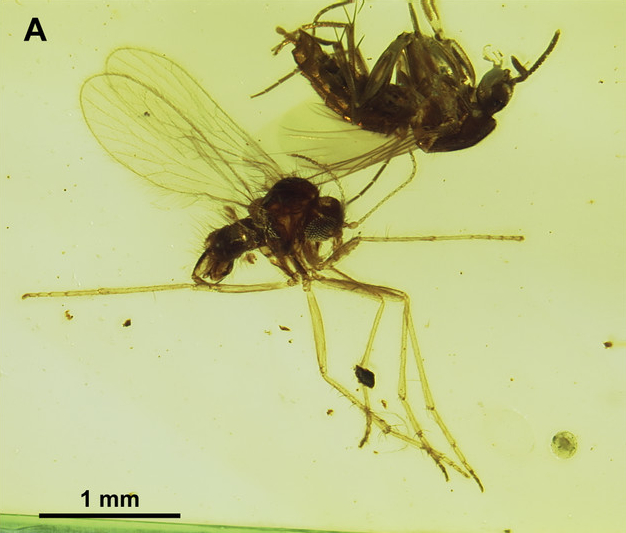
Mandalayia beumersorum

This family has seven subfamilies that contain more than 2600 described species.

- Horaiellinae Enderlein, 1937
  - Horaiella Tonnoir, 1933
  - †Protohoraiella Curler, Krzeminski & Skibinska, 2019 Burmese amber, Myanmar Late Cretaceous (Cenomanian)
- Bruchomyiinae Alexander, 1921 - selected genera:
  - Alexanderia Wagner & Kvifte, 2018 (Oriental)
  - Boreofairchildia Wagner & Stuckenberg, 2016 (Americas)
  - Bruchomyia Alexander, 1921 (South America):
  - Eutonnoiria Alexander, 1940 (Central Africa)
  - Laurenceomyia Wagner & Stuckenberg, 2016 (South America)
  - Nemopalpus Macquart, 1838
  - Notofairchildia Wagner & Stuckenberg, 2016
  - †Hoffeinsodes Wagner, 2017 Baltic amber, Eocene
  - †Palaeoglaesum Wagner, 2017 Burmese amber, Myanmar
- Phlebotominae Rondani, 1840
  - Australophlebotomus Theodor, 1948
  - Bichromomyia Artemiev, 1991
  - Brumptomyia França & Parrot, 1921 (Mexico to South America)
  - Chinius Leng, 1985 (2 species: China, Thailand)
  - Dampfomyia Addis, 1945
  - †Datzia Stebner et al., 2015 (Burmese amber, Cenomanian)
  - Deanemyia Galati, 1995
  - Evandromyia Mangabeira, 1941
  - Edentomyia Galati, Andrade-Filho, da Silva & Falcão, 2003 (Brazil)
  - Expapillata Galati, 1995
  - Hertigia Fairchild, 1949
  - Idiophlebotomus Quate & Fairchild, 1961
  - †Libanophlebotomus Azar et al., 1999 Lebanese amber Early Cretaceous (Barremian)
  - Lutzomyia França, 1924 (North and South America)
  - †Mandalayia Stebner et al., 2015 (Burmese amber, Cenomanian)
  - Martinsmyia Galati, 1995
  - †Mesophlebotomites Azar et al., 1999 Lebanese amber, Barremian
  - Micropygomyia Barretto, 1962
  - Migonemyia Galati, 1995
  - Nyssomyia Barretto, 1962
  - Oligodontomyia Galati, 1995
  - †Palaeomyia Poinar 2004 Burmese amber, Albian
  - †Phlebotomites Stebner et al., 2015 Lebanese amber, Barremian, Burmese amber, Cenomanian
  - †Phlebotoiella Solórzano Kraemer and Wagner 2009 Cambay amber, India, Eocene
  - Phlebotomus Rondani& Berté, 1840 (Europe, Africa, Asia, Australia)
  - Pintomyia Costa Lima, 1932
  - Pressatia Mangabeira, 1942
  - †Protopsychodinae Stebner et al., 2015
  - †Protopsychoda Azar et al., 1999 Lebanese amber, Barremian
  - Psathyromyia Barretto, 1962
  - Psychodopygus Mangabeira, 1941
  - Sciopemyia Barretto, 1962
  - Sergentomyia França & Parrot, 1920 (Europe, Africa, Asia, Australia)
  - Trichophoromyia Barretto, 1962
  - Viannamyia Mangabeira, 1941
  - Warileya Hertig, 1948 (Central and South America)
- †Protopsychodinae Stebner et al., 2015
  - †Datzia Stebner et al., 2015 (Burmese amber, Cenomanian)
  - †Mandalayia Stebner et al., 2015 (Burmese amber, Cenomanian)
  - †Protopsychoda Azar et al., 1999 Lebanese amber, Barremian
- Psychodinae Newman, 1834
  - Abcharis Tkoc and Jezek, 2013 (= Notiocharis Eaton, 1913, preoccupied) (Australia)
  - Alloeodidicrum Duckhouse, 1990 (Australia)
  - Arisemus Satchell, 1955
  - Atrichobrunettia Satchell, 1953
  - Australopericoma Vaillant, 1975
  - Balbagathis Quate, 1996
  - Bazarella Vaillant, 1961
  - Berdeniella Vaillant, 1976
  - Boreoclytocerus Duckhouse, 1978
  - Breviscapus Quate, 1955
  - Brunettia Annandale, 1910
  - Clogmia Enderlein, 1937
  - Clytocerus Eaton, 1904
  - Didicrum Enderlein, 1937
  - Epacretron Quate, 1965
  - Eremolobulosa Duckhouse, 1990 (Australia)
  - Eurygarka Quate, 1959
  - Feuerborniella Vaillant, 1974
  - Gerobrunettia Quate & Quate, 1967
  - Lepimormia Enderlein, 1937
  - Lepidiella Enderlein, 1937
  - Lobulosa Szabo, 1960
  - Maruina Müller, 1895 (Americas)
  - †Matuna Stebner and Solórzano Kraemer 2014 Mexican amber, Miocene
  - †Megapsychoda Azar and Nel 2002 Crato Formation, Brazil, Early Cretaceous (Aptian)
  - Mormia Enderlein, 1935
  - Neoarisemus Botosaneanu & Vaillant, 1970
  - †Paleopsychoda Azar et al., 1999 Lebanese amber, Barremian, Jordanian amber, Albian, Taimyr amber, Russia, Albian
  - Panimerus Eaton, 1913
  - †Paralibanopsychoda Azar and Nel 2002 Lebanese amber, Barremian
  - Paramormia Enderlein, 1935
  - Parasetomima Duckhouse, 1968 (South America)
  - Paratelmatoscopus Satchell, 1953 (Australia)
  - Pericoma Haliday, in Walker, 1856
  - Peripsychoda Enderlein, 1935
  - Philosepedon Eaton, 1904 (Europe, North and Central America)
  - Pneumia Enderlein, 1935 (= Satchelliella Vaillant, 1979)
  - Psychoda Latreille, 1796
  - Rotundopteryx Duckhouse, 1990 (Australia)
  - Saraiella Vaillant, 1981
  - Setomima Enderlein, 1937
  - Stupkaiella Vaillant, 1973
  - †Succinarisemus Wagner, 2002 Mexican amber, Dominican amber, Miocene
  - Szaboiella Vaillant, 1979
  - Telmatoscopus Eaton, 1904
  - Thornburghiella Vaillant, 1982
  - Threticus Eaton, 1904
  - Tinearia Schellenberg, 1803
  - Tonnoiriella Vaillant, 1982
  - Trichopsychoda Tonnoir, 1922
  - Ulomyia Walker, 1856 (= Saccopterix Haliday, in Curtis, 1839, preoccupied)
  - Vaillantodes Wagner, 2002 ( = Vaillantia Wagner, 1993, preoccupied)
  - †Wightipsychoda Azar 2019 Bembridge Marls, United Kingdom, Priabonian
- Sycoracinae Jung, 1954
  - Aposycorax Duckhouse, 1972
  - †Palaeoparasycorax Stebner et al., 2015 (Burmese amber, Cenomanian)
  - Parasycorax Duckhouse, 1972
  - Sycorax Haliday, in Curtis, 1839
- Trichomyiinae Tonnoir, 1922
  - †Axenotrichomyia Azar et al., 2015 Burmese amber, Cenomanian
  - †Eatonisca Meunier, 1905 Baltic, Bitterfeld amber, Eocene
  - †Eotrichomyia Meunier Oise amber, France Eocene (Ypresian)
  - Trichomyia Haliday, in Curtis, 1839
  - †Xenotrichomyia Azar et al., 2015 New Jersey amber, Late Cretaceous (Turonian)
- Incertae sedis
  - †Bamara Stebner et al., 2015 Burmese amber, Cenomanian
  - †Cretapsychoda Azar et al., 1999 Lebanese amber, Barremian
  - †Eochaoborites Hong, 2002 Fushun amber, China, Ypresian
  - †Eophlebotomus Cockerell, 1920 Lebanese amber, Barremian, Charentese amber, France, Cenomanian, Burmese amber, Cenomanian
  - †Liassopsychodina Ansorge, 1994 Green Series, Germany, Early Jurassic (Toarcian)
  - †Libanopsychoda Azar et al., 1999 Lebanese amber, Barremian
  - †Mesopsychoda Brauer et al., 1889 Cheremkhovskaya Formation, Russia, Toarcian
  - †Protopsychoda Azar et al., 1999 Lebanese amber, Barremian
  - †Tanypsycha Ansorge, 1994 Green Series, Germany, Toarcian
  - †Triassopsychoda Blagoderov and Grimaldi. 2007 Cow Branch Formation, North Carolina, Late Triassic (Norian)
  - †Xenopsychoda Azar and Ziadé, 2005 Lebanese amber, Barremian

== See also ==
- Fungus gnat
- Trichomyia lengleti
