= Sycorax (fly) =

Scientific classification
- Domain: Eukaryota
- Kingdom: Animalia
- Phylum: Arthropoda
- Class: Insecta
- Order: Diptera
- Family: Psychodidae
- Genus: Sycorax; Haliday, 1839

Genus of flies

Sycorax is a genus of moth flies and sand flies in the family Psychodidae. There are at least 40 described species in Sycorax.

== Species ==
These 43 species belong to the genus Sycorax:

- Sycorax africana Tonnoir, 1920^{c g}
- Sycorax alpina Vaillant, 1978^{c g}
- Sycorax andicola Young, 1979^{c g}
- Sycorax assimilis Barretto, 1956^{c g}
- Sycorax australis Duckhouse, 1965^{c g}
- Sycorax bahiensis Bravo, 2003^{c g}
- Sycorax bicornua Krek, 1970^{c g}
- Sycorax bidentis Santos, Ferreira & Bravo^{g}
- Sycorax caucasica Jezek, 1990^{c g}
- Sycorax chilensis Tonnoir, 1929^{c g}
- Sycorax colombiensis Young, 1979^{c g}
- Sycorax cryptella Satchell, 1950^{c g}
- Sycorax dispar Satchell, 1950^{c g}
- Sycorax duckhousi Wagner, 1989^{c g}
- Sycorax fairchildi Young, 1979^{c g}
- Sycorax feuerborni Jung, 1954^{c g}
- Sycorax filipinae Quate, 1965^{c g}
- Sycorax furca Curler^{g}
- Sycorax goutneri Jezek, 1990^{c g}
- Sycorax impatiens Satchell, 1950^{c g}
- Sycorax kalengoensis Wagner, 1979^{c g}
- Sycorax konopiki Jezek^{g}
- Sycorax longispinosa Bravo, 2007^{c g}
- Sycorax malayensis Quate, 1962^{c g}
- Sycorax milleri Satchell, 1950^{c g}
- Sycorax nipponicus Tokunaga & Komyo, 1955^{c g}
- Sycorax popovi Jezek, 1990^{c g}
- Sycorax satchelli Barretto, 1956^{c g}
- Sycorax silacea Haliday, 1839^{c g}
- Sycorax similis (Müller, 1927)^{c g}
- Sycorax sinuosa Curler^{g}
- Sycorax slovacus Halgos, 1975^{c g}
- Sycorax spina Curler^{g}
- Sycorax tomkineana Jezek^{g}
- Sycorax tonnoiri Jung, 1954^{c g}
- Sycorax tridentata Curler^{g}
- Sycorax trifida Krek, 1970^{c g}
- Sycorax trispinosa Young, 1979^{c g}
- Sycorax tuberculata Santos, Bravo & Falqueto^{g}
- Sycorax usambaricus Wagner & Andersen, 2007^{c g}
- Sycorax utriensis Bejarano, Duque & Velez, 2008^{c g}
- Sycorax wampukrum Bravo, 2009^{c g}
- Sycorax webbi Curler^{g}

Data sources: i = ITIS, c = Catalogue of Life, g = GBIF, b = Bugguide.net
