= Alfred Edwin Eaton =

English clergyman and entomologist

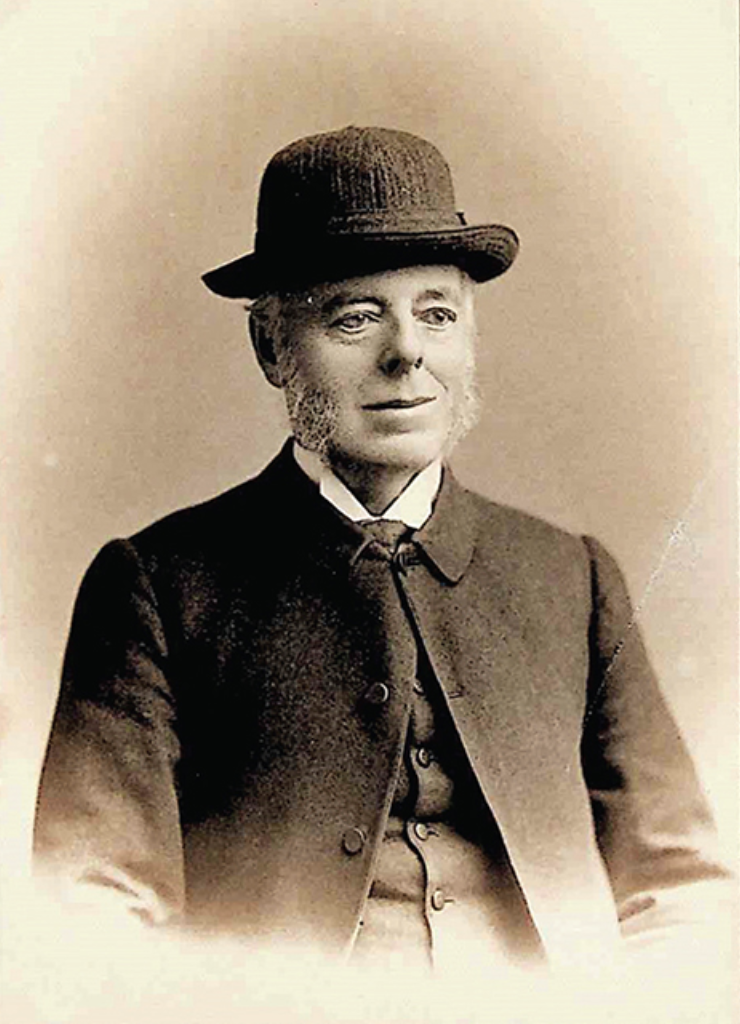
- Born: 1 December 1844; Little Bredy, Dorset, England
- Died: 23 March 1929 (aged 84); Northam, Devon, England
- Occupations: Entomologist; Clergyman

Alfred Edwin Eaton (1 December 1844 – 23 March 1929) was an English clergyman and entomologist. He served as the vicar of Shepton Montague in Somerset. His main interests among insects were the Diptera and Ephemeroptera.

== Biography ==
=== Family and Ecclesiastical Life ===
Eaton's parents were Clergyman Richard Storks Eaton (c.1803–1865) and Sophia Abraham (c.1806–1875), who were married at Teignmouth on 17 April 1833. Richard was the Rector of Little Bredy, Dorset and Curate of Compton Abbas. Before Alfred was born, Richard and Sophia had four other children: Henry (1834–1909), Frances (1836–1871), Robert (1839–1901), and Frederic (1841–1916). Alfred Edwin Eaton was born on 1 December 1844 at Little Bredy and baptised on 19 January 1845.

The early education of the Eaton children was from a governess, Harriet Dive, who lived with the family. Young Alfred later attended Reverend James Penny's Grammar School in Blandford, Dorset, before he began studies at Trinity College Cambridge. Eaton graduated with a First Class Tripos in Natural Sciences in 1867, and gained a Masters Degree in 1871.

Eaton and his older brother Walter both became clergymen like their father with Alfred being ordained as a Deacon by the Bishop of Lichfield in 1869 and ordained as a Priest in 1870. Eaton's brother Henry became a Meteorologist and was later President of the British Meteorological Society and Eaton's brother Robert trained as a Civil Engineer. Rev. Walter Eaton, assisted by Alfred, officiated at the wedding of their sister Frances in 1870 to Edward Pinney, who was also from a clergy family. Frances died in 1871, shortly after the birth of her first child.

Eaton's ecclesiastical appointments were interspersed with his scientific travels: he was the Curate of Ashbourne from 1869 to 1871, then became Curate of Battlesden from c.1873–1874. Eaton also briefly served as a Curate in Paddington, London, before setting off as Naturalist on the Svalbard Expedition.

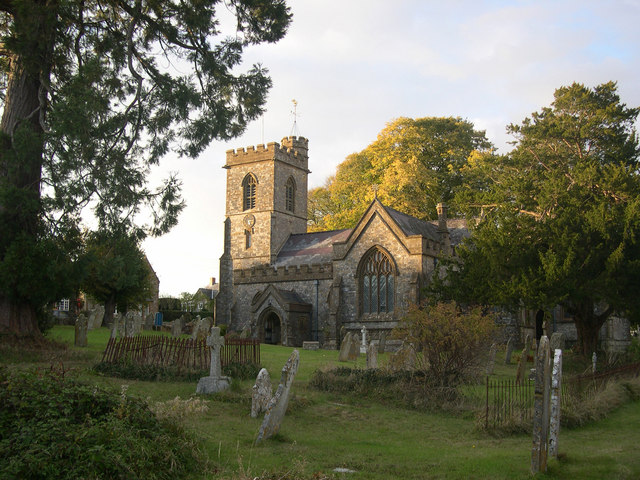
St Mary's Church at Thorncombe, where Eaton was Curate in Charge in 1882.

Eaton resumed work as a Curate again in 1882, at Thorncombe, filling in for the usual Vicar Charles A. Bragge who had departed on a continental tour to recover from illness in 1881. Eaton was resident in the village during a disastrous fire on 19 May 1882 which destroyed about 20 houses, although no one was killed. The fire had begun at a bakery and quickly spread through the thatched roofs of nearby properties. Eaton opened up the village church and vicarage to assist those who had been made homeless, and was involved in the fundraising efforts to rebuild, writing an appeal letter which was printed in The Western Gazette in which he noted that 70 people, mainly the village's poorest residents, had lost their homes. The fundraising was so successful that the Thorncombe fire relief fund could close its accounts by 29 May.

Eaton later worked as Curate at Shepton Montague from 1887 to 1892.

On 8 May 1884 Eaton married Mary Ellen Warry (1857–1941) of West Coker, Somerset. They had two children: Ethel Frances (1885–1958) and Alfred Henry (1887–1970).

In his later years Eaton was a resident of Northam, Devon, where he died at the age of 84 on 23 March 1929.

=== Scientific career ===
Eaton's interest in natural history was well established by his teenage years. While he was a student at Cambridge, Eaton contributed to journals like The Entomologist's Monthly Magazine, and he is recorded as presenting his research at meetings of the Entomological Society in London (many years later, Eaton would become the Royal Entomological Society's Senior Fellow). Eaton's greatest scientific interest was in insects, but he was also a notable botanical collector. Eaton collected specimens widely on a professional basis and to send to friends and colleagues.

The Entomologist Robert McLachlan (1837–1904) was a friend of Eaton – Eaton's brother Henry was McLachlan's longstanding companion on scientific travels. McLachlan's interest in freshwater insects - in his case, Trichoptera - meant that he and Eaton collaborated often. McLachlan regularly sent his Ephemeroptera specimens to Eaton to describe, and in return Eaton gave most of his own Ephemeroptera specimens to McLachlan, whose collection was acquired by British Museum in 1938. Eaton's own collection of 200 microscope slides and c.1800 pinned insects, mostly Psychodidae, were donated to the British Museum by his widow Mary after his death.

Eaton travelled extensively for his research, taking his vacations at places where Trichoptera and Ephemeroptera had not been studied. McLachlan observed: 'if a foreigner making short holiday tours through certain districts previously unexplored (so far as these insects are concerned) can produce such results, it is needless to call attention to what might be done by residents in the districts.'

== Selected Expeditions and Travels ==
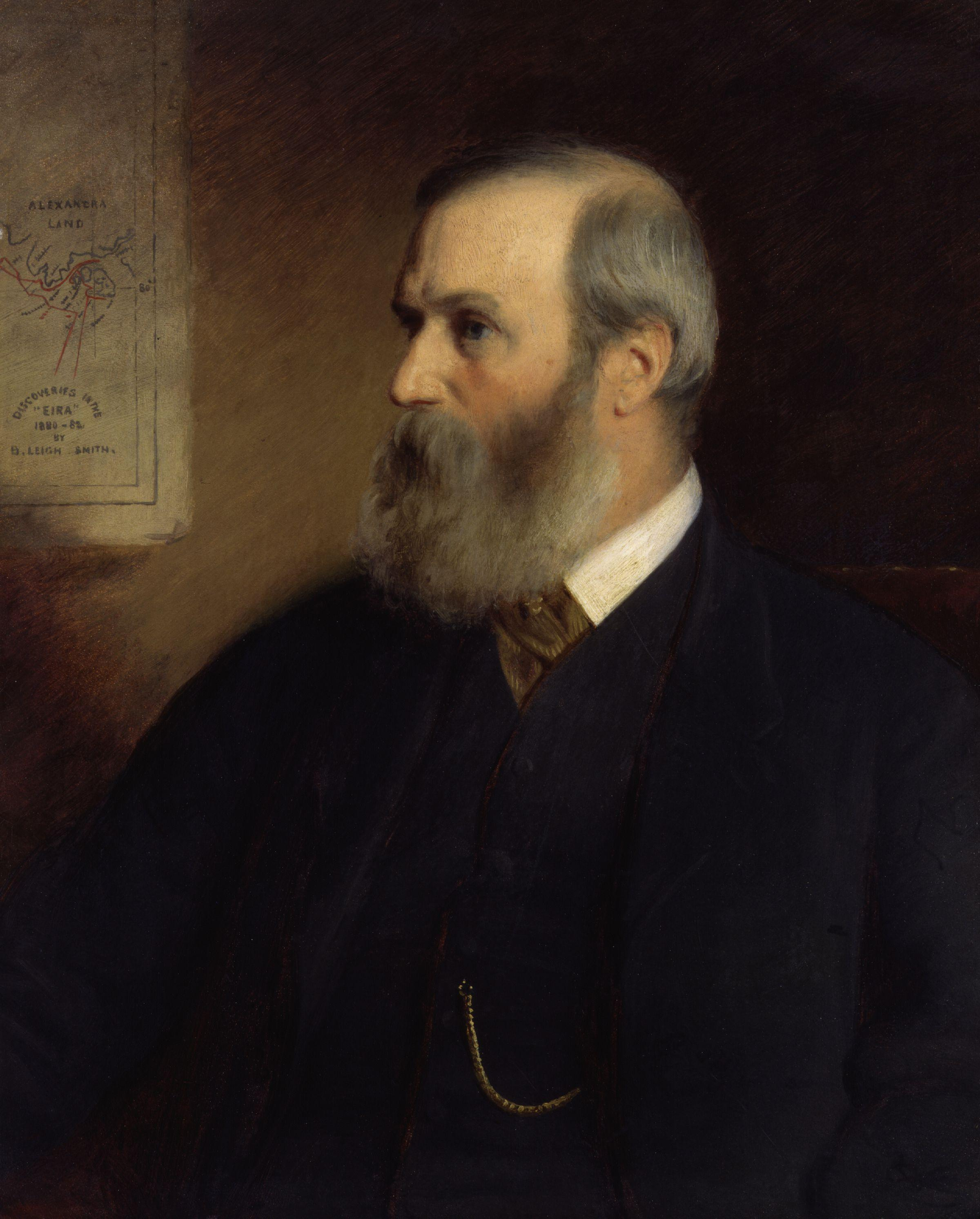
Benjamin Leigh Smith, who invited Eaton onto his 1873 Svalbard Expedition

=== 1873: Leigh Smith's Svalbard Expedition, 10 May – 27 September ===
Arctic explorer Benjamin Leigh Smith selected his friend Eaton to accompany him on the screw steamer Diana, to bring supplies to the Swedish ships of Nordenskiöld's 1872 Svalbard Expedition, which Leigh Smith suspected had become beset by ice in Mossel Bay. The Diana was successful in its relief mission and continued on to survey areas of Svalbard which had not yet been documented by Swedish scientists. Eaton's official position on the Diana was Ship's Surgeon and General Practitioner, but he was also the Svalbard Expedition's naturalist.

Eaton prepared a list of known flora and fauna of the region, to compare with what he was able to discover while surveying the northern part of Svalbard. Eaton noted that Leigh Smith and his other companions spent much of their spare time deer-stalking, leaving him to his natural history pursuits. The main focus of Eaton's collecting was on insects, plants, and dredging from the ship. Eaton felt that carrying arms and ammunition while exploring was cumbersome considering his other equipment, and that if attacked by a Polar Bear he would be able to drive it off. However, in 'very bearish localities' an armed crew member was sent to guard Eaton while he worked.

Eaton noted the large number of human burials on Svalbard: on 8 September, he and his companions found skeletal human remains in Green Harbour [Grønfjorden] while searching for plants. The deceased person had been in possession of a rosary and images of saints, and Eaton performed a Christian burial service as best he could before the men had to return to the ship.

Eaton's collections from this Expedition were distributed among other scientists, with the Lepidoptera being first sent to Philipp Christoph Zeller and then Henry Tibbats Stainton. Among the moths collected by Eaton was the newly-discovered species Plutella polaris, described and named by Zeller from male examples, which was then not seen again until 2015 when a female of the species was finally discovered.

Eaton's Crustacea specimens from Svalbard were sent to be worked up by Edward John Miers. Of Eaton's plant collections, the Phanerogams and Cryptogams were examined by Spencer Le Marchant Moore, the Algae by George Dickie, and the Diatioms by Eugene O'Meara.

Eaton gave a presentation about his experiences, illustrated with photographs, to the Entomological Society on 2 March 1874.

=== 1874 – 1875: Transit of Venus Expedition ===
Eaton was with one of the British parties that travelled to the Kerguelen Archipelago to observe the 1874 Transit of Venus, from October 1874 to February 1875. After an initial leg of the journey that stopped in South Africa at the Cape (where Eaton collected Fungi), Eaton's specimen collecting when he reached the Kergulen Islands was mainly conducted at Royal Sound, Swain's Bay and Observatory Bay. Eaton particularly owed his success in plant-gathering at Swain's Bay to the kindness of Captain Henry Fairfax of HMS Volage, who conveyed Eaton around the hard-to-access parts of the Bay in his Gig. Eaton confirmed previous plant lists for the area and added many new records for Cryptogams, particularly Algae. Eaton also described a species of flightless moth Embryonopsis halticella from the Kergulen Islands.

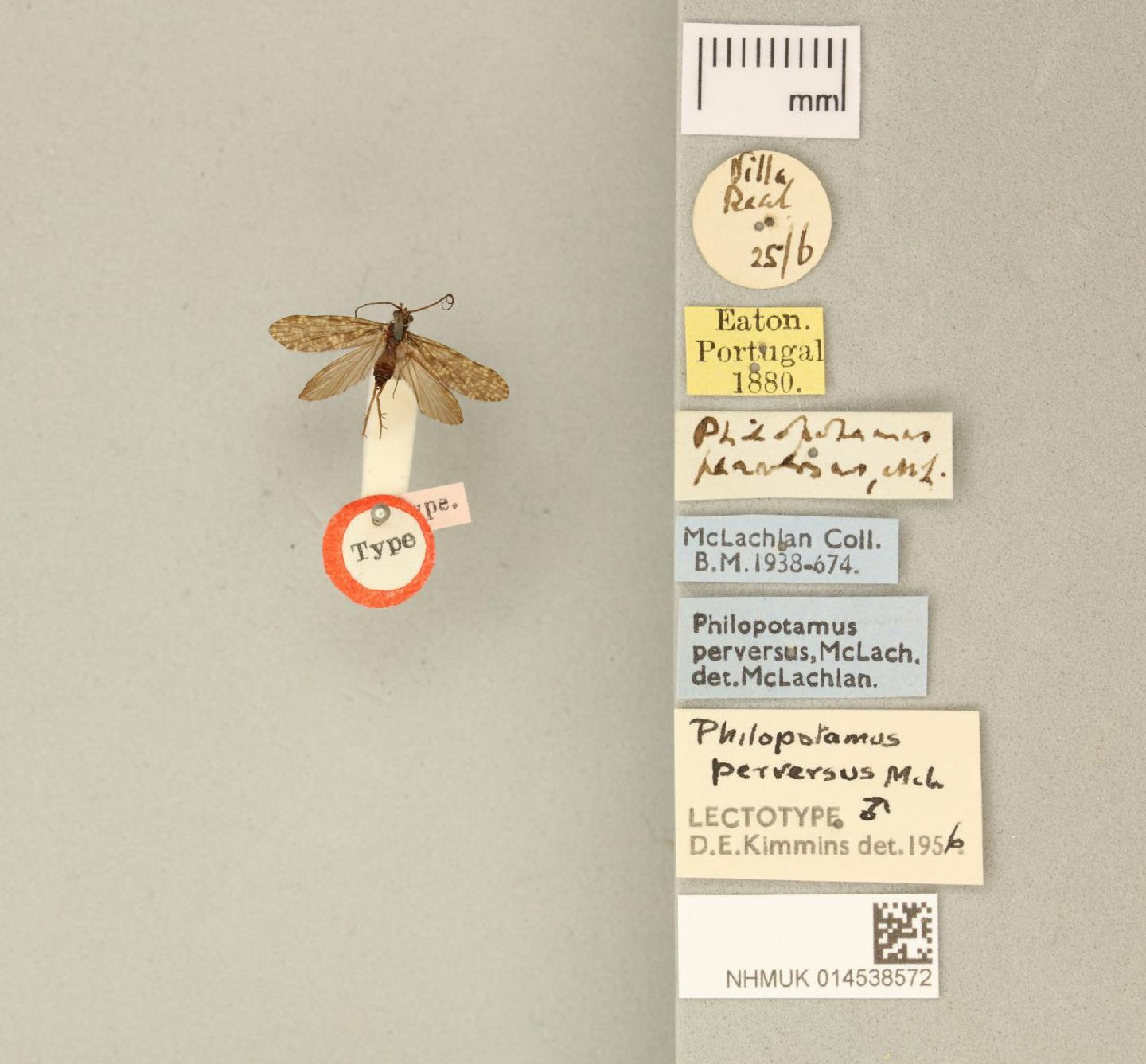
Lectotype specimen of the Caddisfly Philopotamus montanus perversus McLachlan, 1884 collected by Eaton at Vila Real, Portugal, on 25 June 1880 (NHMUK014538572).

=== 1880: Portugal, Madeira and the Canary Islands ===
Eaton could not speak any Portuguese at first and spent some time with a phrasebook trying to build his confidence before venturing out into the countryside to look for insects.

Eaton was at Lisbon and Sintra from 23–30 April. He collected Trichoptera at Sintra, but found that the rivers near Lisbon were too polluted for freshwater insects: 'The streams nearer Lisbon have all the goodness washed out of them by Launderesses.'

Eaton stayed at Almodóvar from 6–12 May, and then took a walking tour in Algarve – his destinations included Serra do Caldeirão, São Bartolomeu de Messines, Silves (14–17 May), Monchique (19–21 May), Alferce and São Marcos da Serra, Santa Clara-a-Nova before heading back to Almodôvar. One night while exploring in the mountains, Eaton was without a place to stay and begged a peasant family for accommodation. The family shared their meal, Eaton joined their evening prayers, and the grown-up daughter of the family moved into a cow shed for the night so that Eaton could have a place to sleep in their cottage. Eaton noted he had great difficulty trying to persuade the family to let him recompense them for their hospitality. The parts of Alentejo and Algarve where Eaton visited were considered quite inaccessible, and Eaton's Lepidoptera collections from this trip are notable for being some of the only ones recorded in those parts of Portugal until at least the 1940s.

Eaton was at Cea from 4–11 June, Ponte de Morcellos from 12–14 June, Vila Real from 22–25 June and Salamonde and Ruivaes from 29–30 June.

From November–December 1880 Eaton visited Madeira (17 – 30 November), Gran Canaria (6 – 12 December), Tenerife (14–28 December) and Palma (29 December). The Neuroptera he found upon this part of the trip were described by Robert McLachlan.

The Portuguese Macrolepidoptera collected by Eaton were sent for description to Otto Staudinger, and the Microlepidoptera sent to Émile Louis Ragonot. Eaton gifted over 500 Trichoptera specimens from his Portuguese tour to Robert McLachlan.

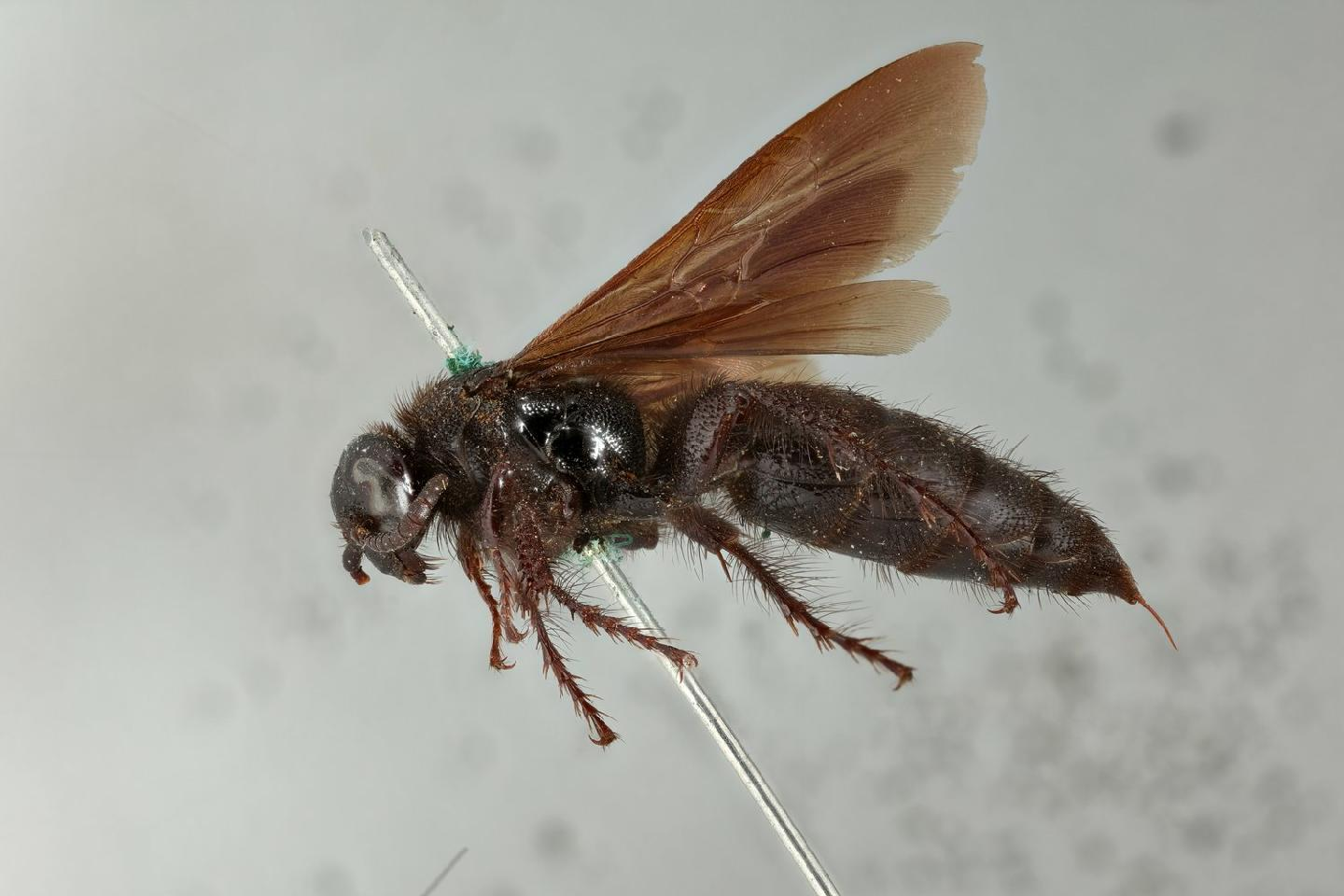
A specimen of the wasp Scolia (Scolia) carbonaria Linnaeus 1767. Collected by Eaton in Algeria on 4 July 1893, and later sent to Edward Saunders (NHMUK010817531)

=== 1892 – 1897: Algeria ===
Eaton travelled to Algeria towards the end of 1892 and apart from occasional return visits to England, he stayed in the country until mid-1897.

On 22 June 1896 at Forêt d'El Oubeïra Eaton was detained by the local authorities. He had no identification papers, and was suspected of being either a madman due to his dishevelled appearance, or a spy due to his proximity to the Tunisian border. Eaton showed his jar of collected dragonflies in order to explain himself. Eaton joked that he regretted being released as he would not have the opportunity to try to collect lice from an Algerian prison.

Eaton presented the Hymenoptera specimens he found upon his Algerian travels to Edward Saunders.

=== 1902: Southern Norway ===
Eaton was accompanied by his wife Mary on this excursion. Eaton collected insects 'whenever opportunity offered, which was not often.' The Eatons entered Norway via Christiana [Oslo]. Travelling by rail, road and steamer ship, their travel itinerary had the stopping at Sandviken, Hønefoss, Heen, Sørum, through the Valdres District to Lærdalsøren, Gudvangen, Vossevangen, Eide and Bergen along with intermediate localities on route.

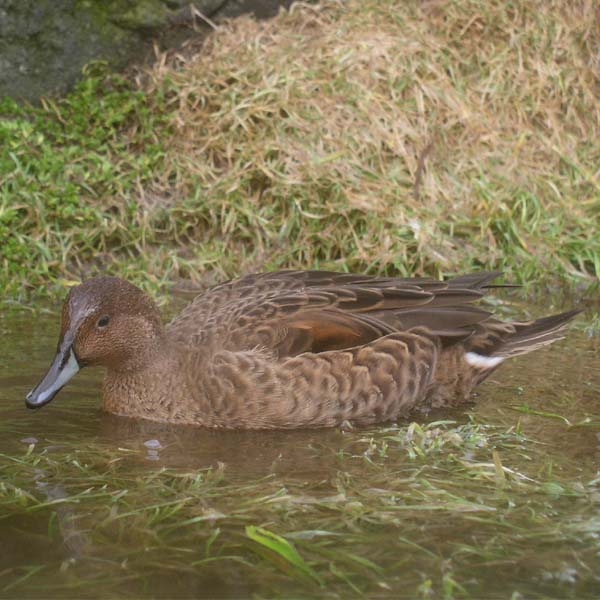
Anas eatoni

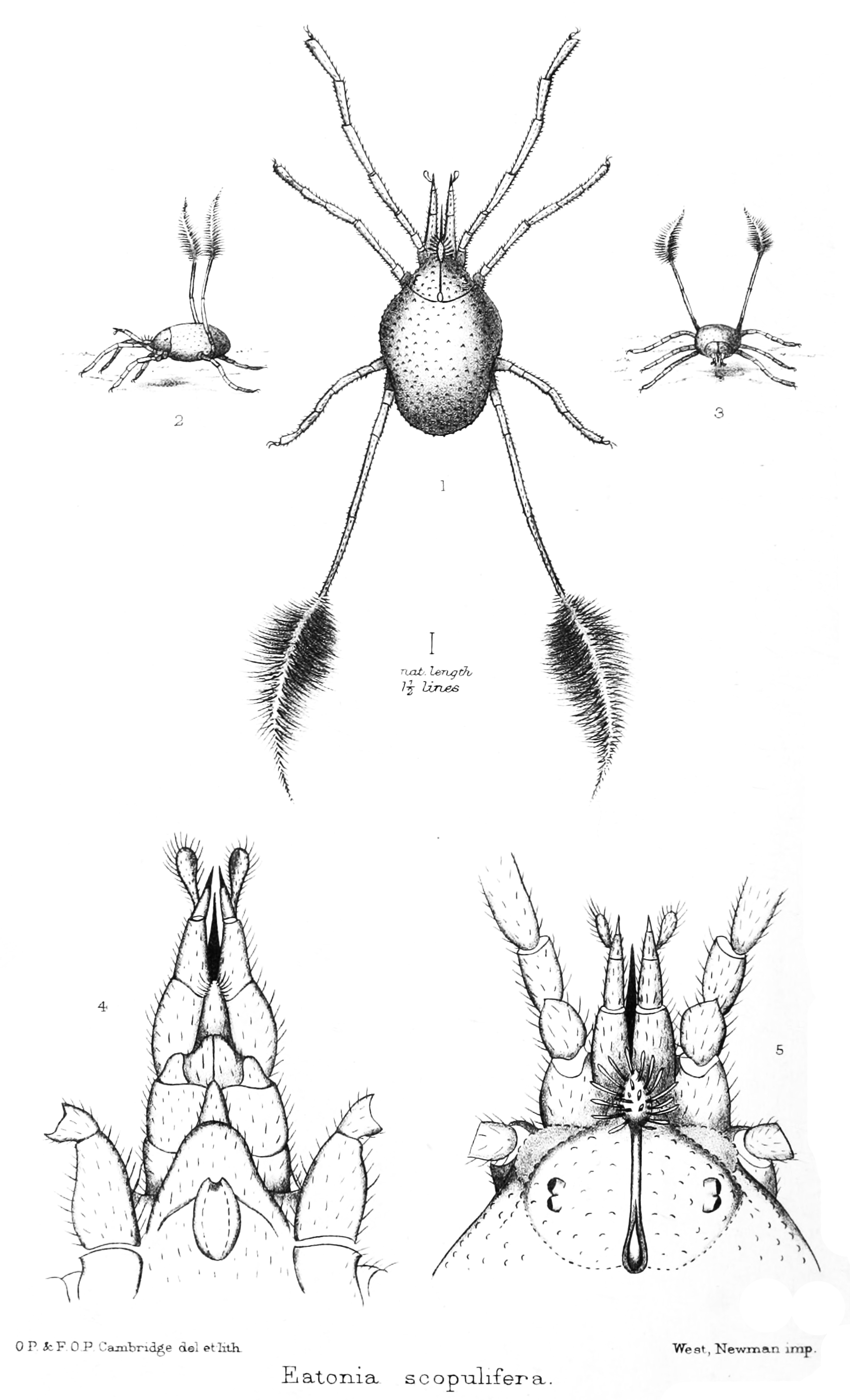
Eatoniana scopulifera, illustrated by Octavius and Frederick Pickard-Cambridge

== Taxonomic names in honour of Eaton ==
The Gastropoda family Eatoniellidae, including the genus Eatoniella Dall, 1876

The Arachnida genus Eatoniana Cambridge, 1898 (originally Eatonia), named by Octavius Pickard-Cambridge for the species Eatoniana scopulifera which Eaton had collected in Biskra, Algeria.

The duck species Anas eatoni subsp. eatoni (Sharpe, 1875)

The moth species Clepsis eatoniana (Ragonot, 1881) Ragonot, 1881 – now considered a synonym of Clepsis consimilana (Hübner).

== Selected publications ==
- Eaton, Rev. A. E. (1871): A Monograph on the Ephemeridae: Part I: The Nomenclature of the Ephemeridae. The Transactions of the Entomological Society 1871, part I.
- Eaton, Rev. A. E. (November 1873): Notes on the Fauna of Spitzbergen. The Zoologist, second series, volume 8.
- Eaton, Rev. A. E. (September 1880): Notes on the Entomology of Portugal. I. Introduction. The Entomologist's Monthly Magazine, volume 17, 1880, pp. 73–79
- Eaton, Rev. A. E. (1896): An English Entomologist Arrested in Algeria. The Entomologist's Monthly Magazine, second series, 1896, Volume VII [Volume XXXII], pp. 185–186
