= André Léon Tonnoir =

Belgian entomologist (1885–1940)

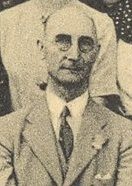
A. L. Tonnoir at the International Congress of Entomology in Madrid, 1935

André Léon Tonnoir (Brussels 9 April 1885 – Canberra 30 January 1940) was a Belgian entomologist.

Born in Brussels, Tonnoir studied engineering followed by radiology at university. He worked as a technician during World War I, and after the war had ended he worked with the entomology staff at the Royal Belgian Institute of Natural Sciences in Brussels. Tonnoir focused in the area of Diptera and worked for the museum until 1921.

He was then persuaded by Robert Tillyard to visit Australia for entomology work there. Soon afterwards, he left for Nelson in New Zealand to do research for the Cawthron Institute until 1924. In the same year, he moved to Christchurch for two new roles; curator at the Canterbury Museum and lecturer at Canterbury College. In 1926, he went back to work for three years at the Cawthron Institute as part of their noxious weeds programme. He eventually went back to Australia, working in Canberra as a Senior Ecologist and Curator.
