= Jens Vahl =

Danish botanist (1796–1854)

Jens Laurentius Moestue Vahl (27 November 1796 – 12 November 1854) was a Danish botanist and pharmacist.

== Biography ==
He was son of the Danish-Norwegian botanist and zoologist Martin Vahl (1749-1804). Jens Vahl graduated as a pharmacist in 1819 and then started studying botany and chemistry.

Vahl participated W. A. Graah's expedition to uninhabited areas of East Greenland in 1828–1830 with the purpose to search for the lost Eastern Norse Settlement. The expedition - in umiaks - was largely unsuccessful, but Vahl's botanical collections extended the previous knowledge much. Financial support from king Christian VIII of Denmark enabled Vahl to continue his investigations. So he travelled in West Greenland from 1829 to 1836, visiting all the Danish colonies from Julianehåb in the South to Upernavik in the North. He returned to Copenhagen in 1836 with very extensive plant collections, which he later donated to the University of Copenhagen. The Vahl collections added several lengths to the previous investigations by Paul Egede, Morten Wormskjold and others, and effectively laid the foundation of knowledge about the flora of Greenland. In contrast to his predecessors, Vahl made meticulous notes on the finding circumstances, like exact location and habitat of the plants.

In 1838–1839, Vahl participated in a French expedition led by Joseph Paul Gaimard (1796–1858) to Nordkapp and Spitsbergen. In 1840, he was made assistant at the Botanic Garden in Copenhagen. He described many new species, e.g. Draba arctica, but he did not finish the planned Greenlandic flora before his death. His successor, Johan Lange, picked up the task two decades later, which resulted in Conspectus Florae Groenlandicae (1887–1894). Together with Salomon Drejer and Joakim Frederik Schouw, Vahl was the publisher of Flora Danica Fasc. 38.

Two plant genera have been named in his honour:

- Vahlodea Fries (1842) in Poaceae
- Mostuea Didr. (1853) in Gelsemiaceae
