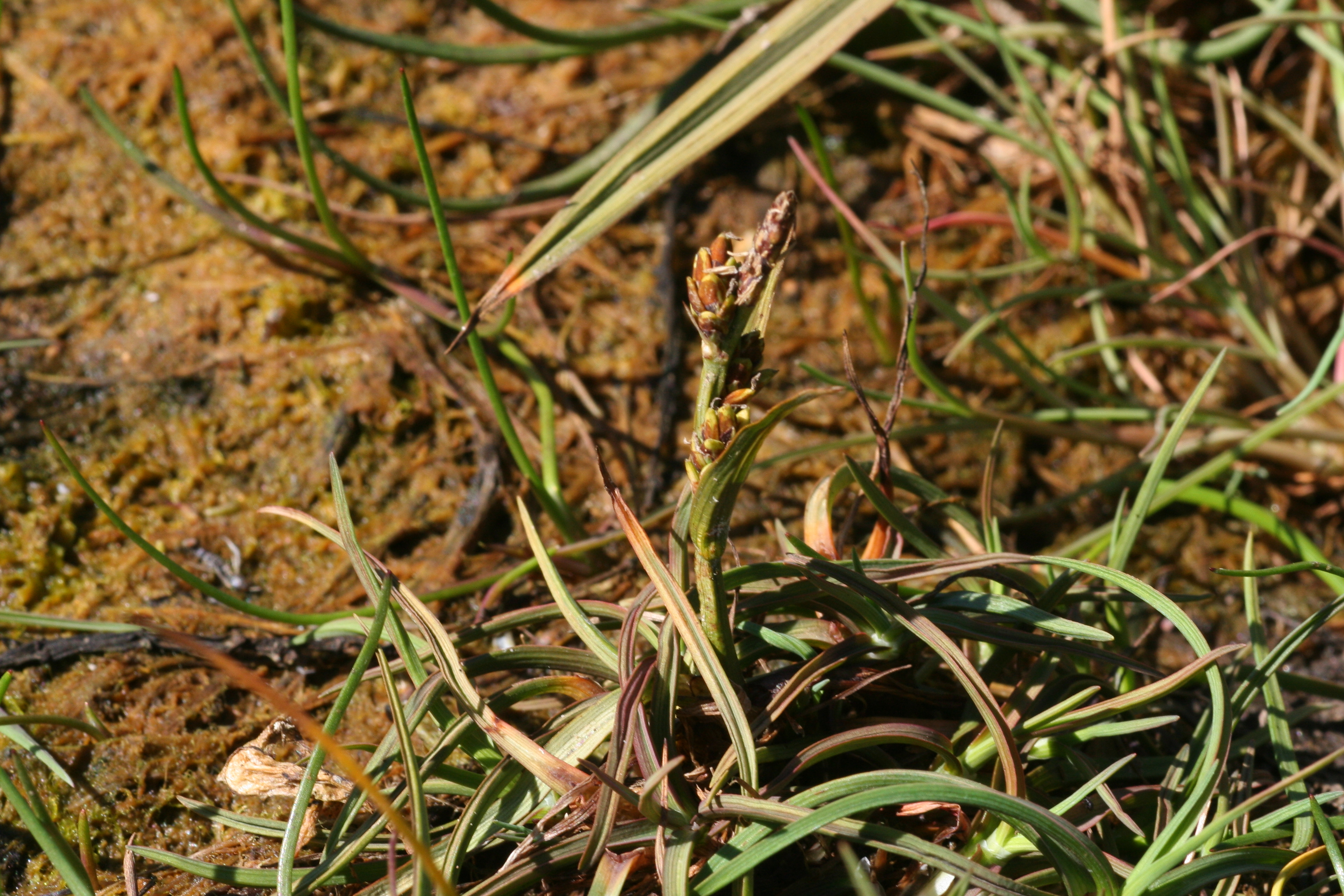

Conservation status
- Least Concern (IUCN 3.1)

Scientific classification
- Kingdom: Plantae
- Clade: Tracheophytes
- Clade: Angiosperms
- Clade: Monocots
- Clade: Commelinids
- Order: Poales
- Family: Cyperaceae
- Genus: Carex
- Species: C. subspathacea

Binomial name
- Carex subspathacea Wormsk. ex Hornem.

Synonyms
- List: Carex hoppneri Boott; Carex subspathacea f. stricta Drejer; Carex salina subsp. subspathacea (Wormsk. ex Hornem.); Carex aquaticus var. nardifolia (Wahlenb.); Carex aquatilis subsp. nardifolia Wahlenb.; Carex salina var. minor Boott; Carex salina f. nana Trautv.; Carex salina var. pumila Blytt; Carex salina f. stricta (Drejer) Almq.; Carex subspathacea f. curvata' Drejer; Carex subspathacea f. nardifolia (Wahlenb.) Fr.; Carex subspathacea var. nardifolia (Wahlenb.) Fr..; Carex subspathacea var. planifolia Fr.; Carex subspathacea f. stricta Drejer.

= Carex subspathacea =

Species of flowering plant in the sedge family

Carex subspathacea, called Hoppner's sedge, is a species of flowering plant in the genus Carex, native to coastal salt marshes of the Arctic and northwest Pacific Oceans; Alaska, Canada, Greenland, Iceland, Norway, northern and far eastern Russia, Korea, and Japan. It is grazed by snow geese (Anser caerulescens).

== Description ==
Carex subspathacea is a low-growing, rhizomatous sedge species, often growing in matted clumps in salty environments such as coastal salt-marshes. Leaves are long and narrow, growing up to 20 cm in height. Culms are smooth, usually shorter than the shoots. The inflorescence is a spike, fruiting in late summer.
