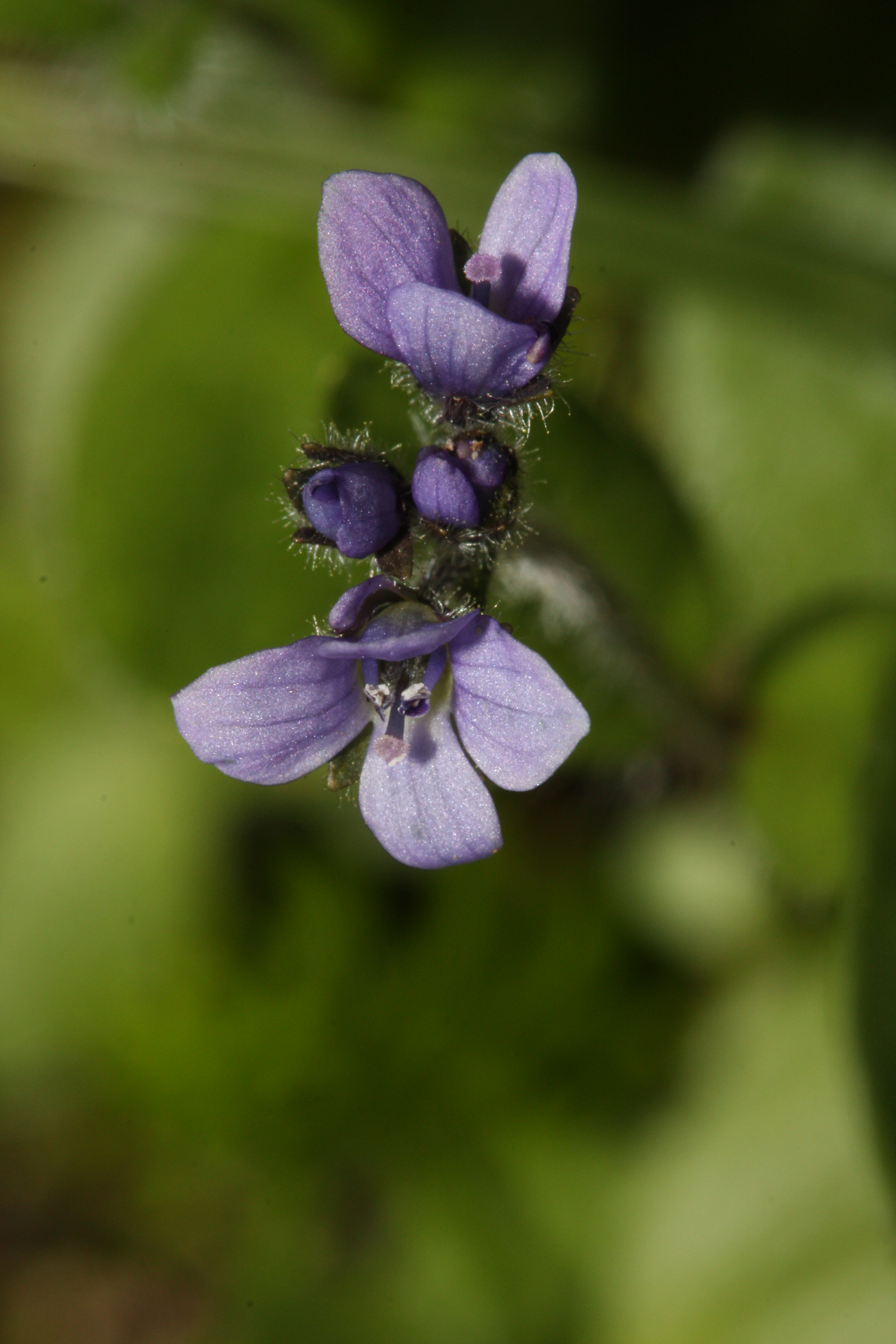

Conservation status
- Secure (NatureServe)

Scientific classification
- Kingdom: Plantae
- Clade: Tracheophytes
- Clade: Angiosperms
- Clade: Eudicots
- Clade: Asterids
- Order: Lamiales
- Family: Plantaginaceae
- Genus: Veronica
- Species: V. wormskjoldii

Binomial name
- Veronica wormskjoldii Roem. & Schult.

Subspecies
- V. w. subsp. alterniflora; V. w. subsp. wormskjoldii

Synonyms
- Veronica mollis; Veronica nutans; Veronica villosa

= Veronica wormskjoldii =

Plant species in the veronica family

Veronica wormskjoldii is a species of flowering plant in the plantain family known by the common name American alpine speedwell. It is native to much of northern and western North America, including the western United States and northern Canada, from where it grows in moist alpine habitat, such as mountain forest understory. It has a wide subarctic distribution from Alaska to Greenland. It is named after the Danish botanist Morten de Wormskjold (1783–1845) who had studied under professor Jens Wilken Hornemann (1770–1841) and had reportedly collected 157 species of vascular plants during an expedition to Greenland in 1812–1813, more than doubling the then number known. The expedition was manifestly to collect specimens for the Flora Danica and was financed by Wormskjold's father, though Hornemann sponsored chancery secretary Friedrich Gustav Heiliger (c.1789-) as botanical draftsman, paid for by the royal treasury. He stayed in Nuuk and in the vicinity of Qaqortoq and was helped to collect the plant specimens by the local Greenlandic population, which Wormskiold described.

== Description ==
It is a rhizomatous perennial herb producing a decumbent to erect, mostly unbranched stem up to 25 to 40 centimeters (9.8 to 16 in) tall and coated in long hairs. The oppositely arranged leaves are 2 to 4 centimeters (0.8 to 1.6 in) long and lack petioles. The inflorescence is a hairy, glandular raceme of flowers at the tip of the stem. Each flower has hairy, lance-shaped sepals and a blue corolla up to a centimeter wide. The fruit is a capsule around half a centimeter long which contains tiny flattened seeds.

== Taxonomy ==
Veronica wormskjoldii was scientifically described and named in 1817 by Johann Jacob Roemer and Josef August Schultes in the first volume of their new edition of Systema Vegetabilium. It is part of the genus Veronica which is classified in the Plantaginaceae family. It has two accepted subspecies.

- Veronica wormskjoldii subsp. alterniflora – Native to western North America from Nunavut south to New Mexico
- Veronica wormskjoldii subsp. wormskjoldii – Native to eastern North America from Greenland to New Hampshire

Veronica wormskjoldii has 14 synonyms of the species or one of its two subspecies.

Table of Synonyms
Name	Year	Rank	Synonym of:	Notes
Veronica alpina var. alterniflora Fernald	1939	variety	subsp. alterniflora	≡ hom.
Veronica alpina var. cascadensis Fernald	1939	variety	subsp. alterniflora	= het.
Veronica alpina var. geminiflora Fernald	1939	variety	subsp. alterniflora	= het.
Veronica alpina var. nutans (Bong.) Ledeb.	1847	variety	subsp. alterniflora	= het.
Veronica alpina var. terrae-novae Fernald	1939	variety	subsp. wormskjoldii	= het.
Veronica alpina var. unalaschcensis Cham. & Schltdl.	1827	variety	subsp. alterniflora	= het.
Veronica alpina var. wormskioldii (Roem. & Schult.) Hook.	1830	variety	V. wormskjoldii	≡ hom.
Veronica alpina subsp. wormskjoldii (Roem. & Schult.) Elenevsky	1977	subspecies	V. wormskjoldii	≡ hom.
Veronica mollis Raf.	1838	species	subsp. alterniflora	= het., nom. illeg. homonym. post.
Veronica nutans Bong.	1833	species	subsp. alterniflora	= het.
Veronica villosa Wormsk. ex Roem. & Schult.	1817	species	subsp. wormskjoldii	= het., not validly publ.
Veronica wormskjoldii f. albiflora Cody	1994	form	subsp. alterniflora	= het.
Veronica wormskjoldii subsp. nutans (Bong.) Albach	2019	subspecies	subsp. alterniflora	= het.
Veronica wormskjoldii var. nutans (Bong.) Pennell	1921	variety	subsp. alterniflora	= het.
Notes: ≡ homotypic synonym; = heterotypic synonym
