= Otto Friedrich Müller =

Danish zoologist

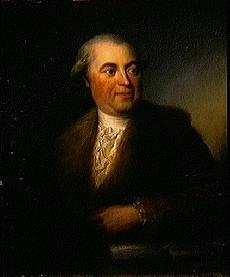
- Müller painted by Erik Pauelsen, 1789.
- Born: 2 November 1730; Copenhagen
- Died: 26 December 1784 (aged 54)
- Scientific career
- Author abbrev. (zoology): O.F. Müller

Otto Friedrich Müller, also known as Otto Friedrich Mueller (2 November 1730 – 26 December 1784) was a Danish naturalist and scientific illustrator.

== Biography ==
Müller was born in Copenhagen. He was educated for the church, became tutor to a young nobleman, and after several years' travel with him, settled in Copenhagen in 1767, and married a lady of wealth.

His first important works, Fauna Insectorum Friedrichsdaliana (Leipzig, 1764), and Flora Friedrichsdaliana (Strasbourg, 1767), giving accounts of the insects and flora of the estate of Frederiksdal, near Copenhagen, recommended him to Frederick V of Denmark, by whom he was employed to continue the Flora Danica a comprehensive atlas of the flora of Denmark. Müller added two volumes to the three published by Georg Christian Oeder since 1761.

The study of invertebrates began to occupy his attention almost exclusively, and in 1771 he produced a work in German on “Certain Worms inhabiting Fresh and Salt Water,” which described many new species of those annulose animals called by Linnaeus aphroditae and nereides, and gave much additional information respecting their habits. He discovered the first diatom ever seen, the colonial diatom Bacillaria paradoxa, though he thought it was an animal because of its movement.

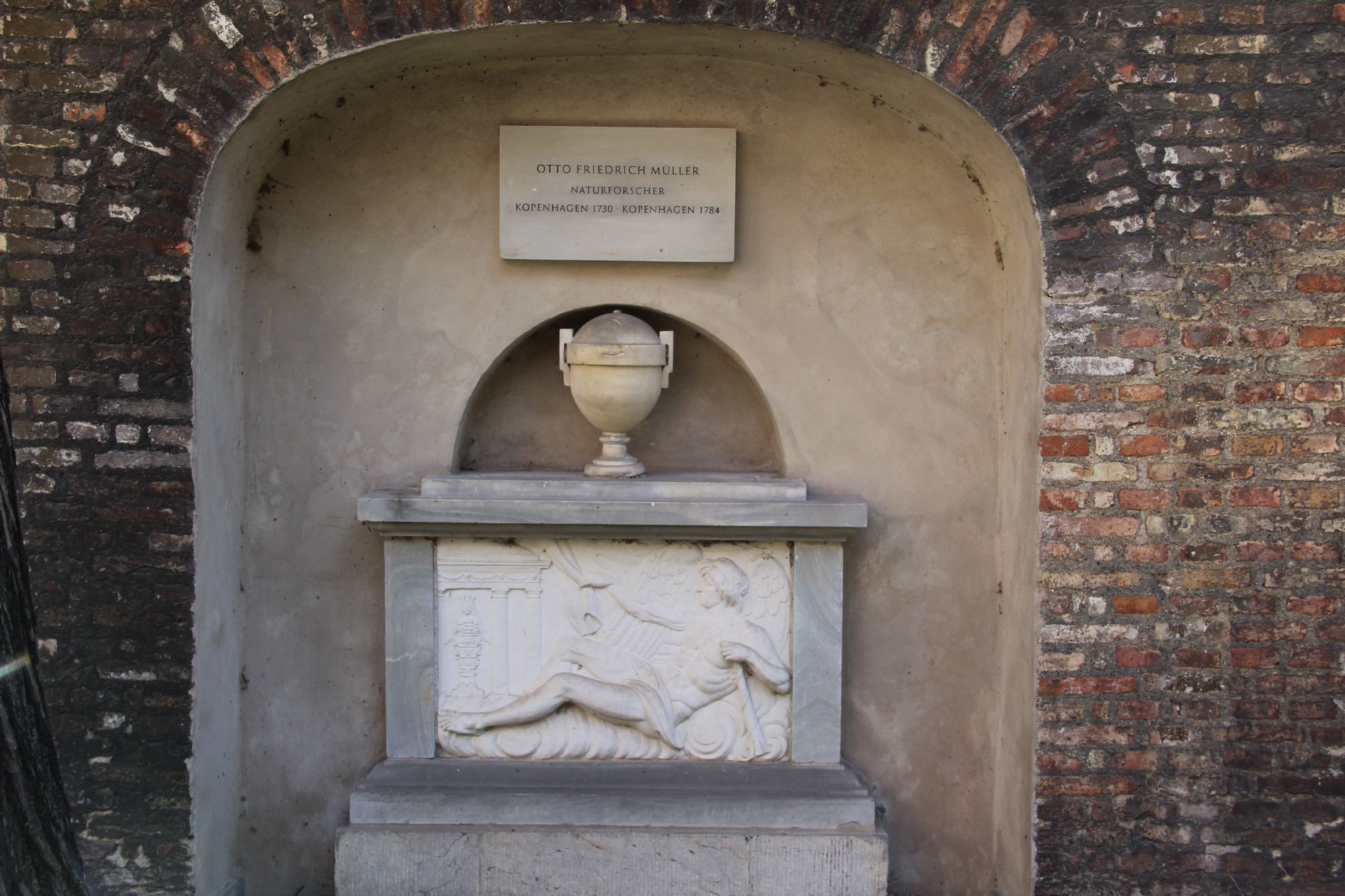
Otto Friedrich Müller gravsten's grave monument at St. Peter's Church in Copenhagen.

In his Vermium Terrestrium et Fluviatilium, seu Animalium Infusoriorum, Helminthecorum, et Testaceorum non Marinorum, succincta Historia (2 vols. in 4to, Copenhagen and Leipzig, 1773–74), he arranged the Infusoria for the first time into genera and species. His Hydrachnæ in Aquis Daniæ Palustribus detectæ et descriptæ (Leipzig, 1781), and Entomostraca (1785), describe many species of microorganisms previously unknown, amongst other dinoflagellates. To these was added an illustrated work on the infusoria, published in 1786. These three works, according to the contemporary dean of naturalists Baron Cuvier, give the author “a place in the first rank of those naturalists who have enriched science with original observations.”

His Zoologiae Danicae Prodromus (1776) was the first survey of the fauna of the combined kingdoms of Norway and Denmark, and classified over three thousand local species. He was one of the first to study microorganisms and established the classification of several groups of animals in addition to the infusoria, including Hydrachnellae and Entomostraca, all unknown to Linnaeus.

He was a member of the Academia Caesarea Leopoldina, a foreign member of the Royal Swedish Academy of Sciences (elected in 1769), the Académie des sciences, Paris, and the Berlin Society of Friends of Natural Science. He had a lasting impact on zoological studies across Europe.

== Works ==
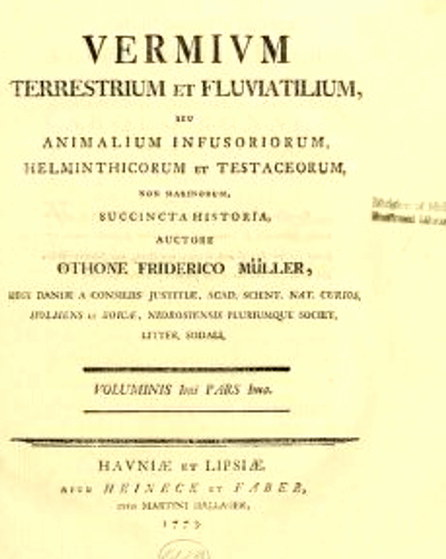
Title page of "Vermivm terrestrium et fluviatilium, seu, Animalium infusoriorum, helminthicorum et testaceorum, non marinorum, succincta historia / auctore Othone Friderico Müller"

- Fauna Insectorum Fridrichsdaliana. Lipsiae: Hafniae et Gleditsch xxiv 96 pp. (1764).
- Vermium terrestrium et fluviatilium, seu animalium infusoriorum, helminthicorum, et testaecorum, non marinorum, succincta historia. Volumen alterum. pp. I-XXVI [= 1-36], 1–214, [1-10]. Havniæ [Copenhagen] et Lipsiæ [Leipzig]: Heineck and Faber, . (1773–1774).
- Zoologiae Danicae Prodromus, seu Animalium Daniae et Norvegiae Indigenarum characteres, nomina, et synonyma imprimis popularium.... Copenhagen, Hallager for the author, . (1776).
  "... the first manual on this topic (Danish and Norwegian Zoology) and was for many years the most comprehensive. It was planned as the beginning of a large illustrated fauna, but only one volume appeared before Müller's death; the following volumes, including those prepared by Søren Abildgaard and Martin Heinrich Rathke, never reached the standard of the Flora Danica begun by Georg Christian Oeder"
- Animalcula infusoria fluviatilia et marina, quae detexit, systematice descripsit et ad vivum delineari curavit. Havniae [Copenhagen] et Lipsiae [Leipzig]: Mölleri, . (1786).
- Entomostraca seu Insecta Testacea, quae in aquis Daniae et Norvegiae reperit, descripsit et iconibus illustravit. 135 pp., . (1785).

== See also ==
- Category:Taxa named by Otto Friedrich Müller
