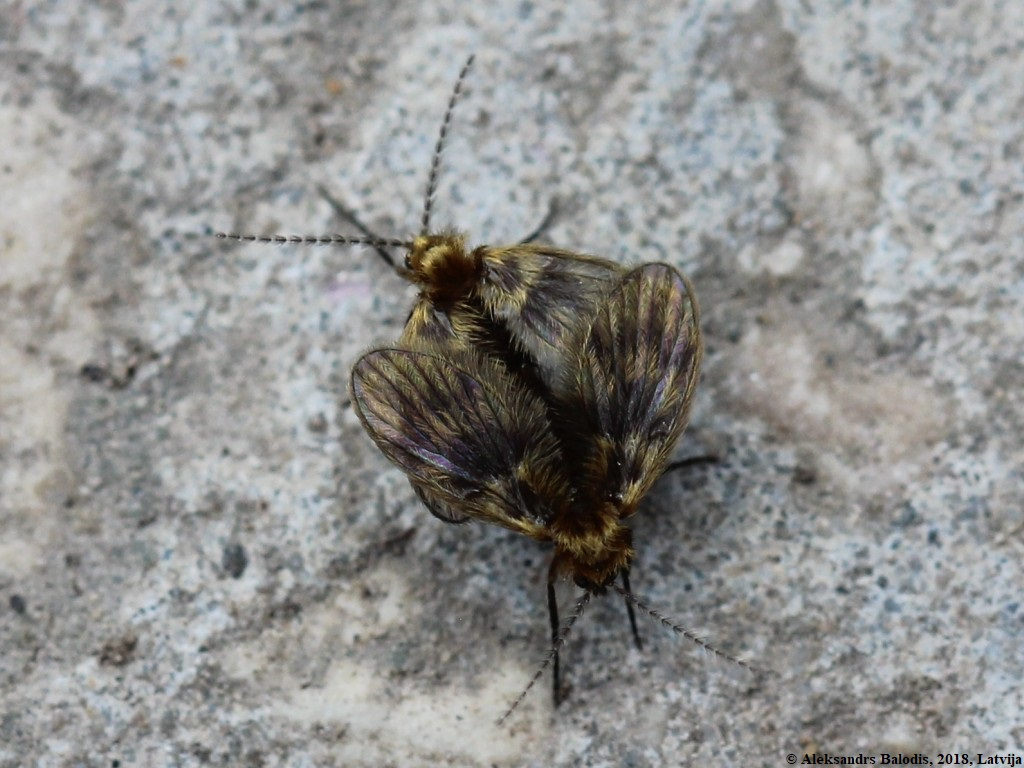
- Adult of Trichomyia urbica

Scientific classification
- Kingdom: Animalia
- Phylum: Arthropoda
- Clade: Pancrustacea
- Class: Insecta
- Order: Diptera
- Family: Psychodidae
- Genus: Trichomyia
- Species: T. urbica

Binomial name
- Trichomyia urbica Haliday in Curtis, 1839

= Trichomyia urbica =

Species of moth fly

Trichomyia urbica is a species of moth fly in the subfamily Trichomyiinae (family Psychodidae). The species is distinguished by the unique morphology and wood-boring behaviour of its larvae, which set it apart from other psychodidae flies.

== Description ==
The larvae of Trichomyia urbica have a regularly cylindrical body that lacks dorsal plaques and long setae, with a densely chitinized head. This morphology differs markedly from other Psychodidae larvae, which often have more delicate bodies and pronounced sensory structures.

The antennae of Trichomyia urbica larvae are small and heavily chitinized, contrasting with the three-segmented antennae of Phlebotomus argentipes, the dome-shaped antennae of Psychodes albipennis, the four-segmented antennae of Sycorax species, and the rod-like antennae of Maruina species.

The mandibles of Trichomyia urbica larvae are robust, toothed, and lack sensory processes, a feature shared only with Phlebotomus argentipes. Other Psychodidae genera, including Sycorax, Psychodes, and Maruina, possess mandibles with leaf-like extensions, long plumose or pectinate setae, and sensory hairs.

The maxillae in Trichomyia urbica larvae are simple plates, lacking the delicate teeth and long setae found in other genera. The lower lip (mentum) is weakly developed, similar to that of Psychodes albipennis and Maruina, but differs from the strongly chitinized and toothed mentum of Phlebotomus argentipes. The anterior spiracles are comparable to other psychodids, while the posterior spiracles are positioned far back on the dorso-lateral region of the last segment, a feature shared only with Phlebotomus argentipes.

== Ecology ==
Larvae of Trichomyia urbica are wood-borers, inhabiting decaying wood rather than the moist soil or aquatic habitats typical of other Psychodidae larvae. Adults are cryptic and possess reduced mouthparts, consistent with the general habits of moth flies.
