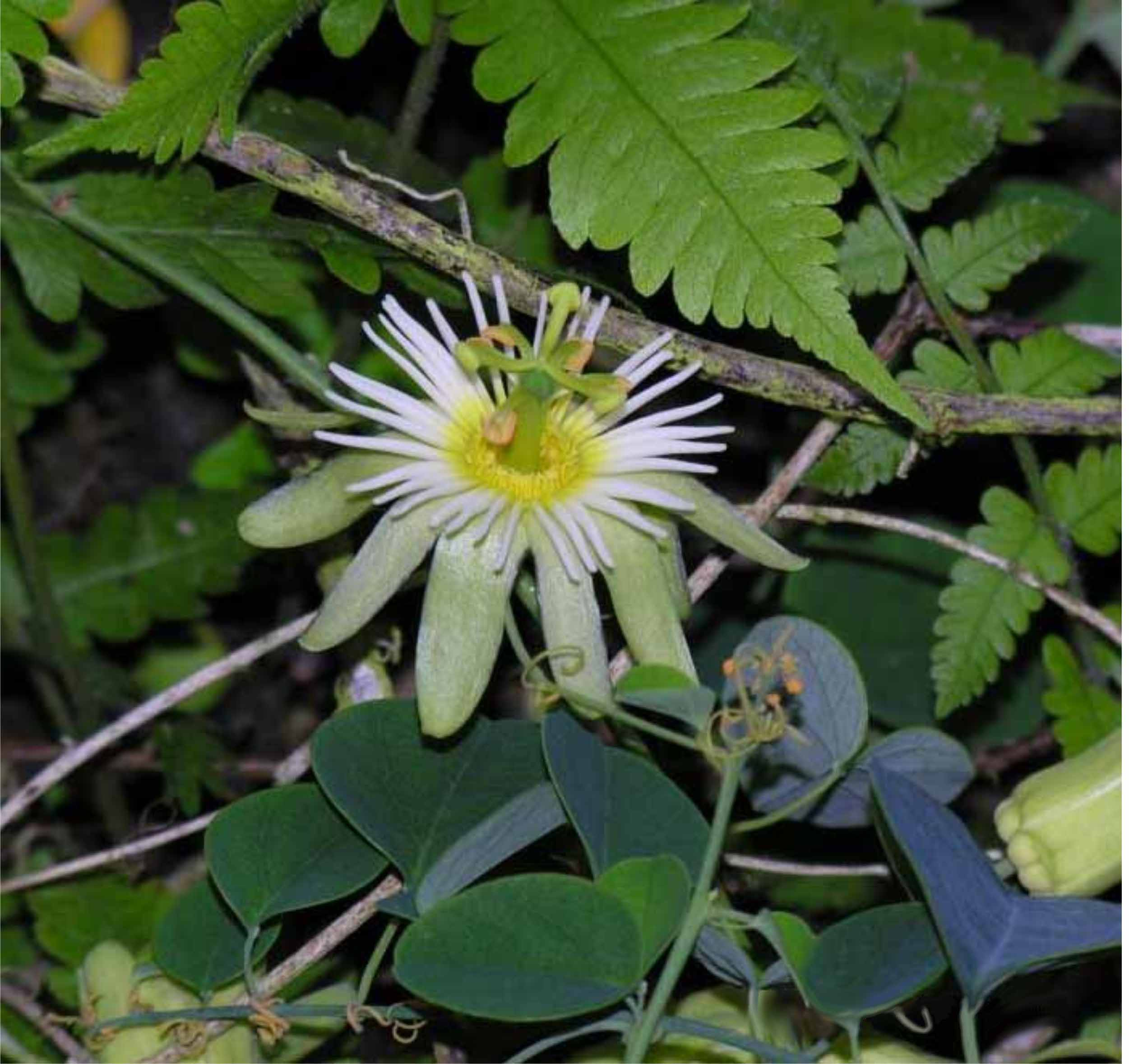

Scientific classification
- Kingdom: Plantae
- Clade: Tracheophytes
- Clade: Angiosperms
- Clade: Eudicots
- Clade: Rosids
- Order: Malpighiales
- Family: Passifloraceae
- Genus: Passiflora
- Species: P. arbelaezii

Binomial name
- Passiflora arbelaezii L.Uribe

= Passiflora arbelaezii =

Species of vine

Passiflora arbelaezii is a species in the family Passifloraceae native to eastern Nicaragua and western Colombia. This species was named in honor of Enrique Pérez Arbeláez, the person who collected the type specimen. It was first formally described in 1957 by Antonio Lorenzo Uribe Uribe. Like Passiflora discophora and Passiflora tryphostemmatoides, this species is rather unusual within its genus, due to the specialised adhesive structures. Passiflora arbelaezii forms branched tendrils with terminal adhesive pads, which form after contact of the distal ends with the substrate. Proliferation of papillate cells ensures close adhesion to the surfaces, which are mirrored in their microtopology by the proliferating cells, in addition to adhesive secretions of the structures.
