= Joakim Frederik Schouw =

Danish lawyer, botanist and politician (1789–1852)

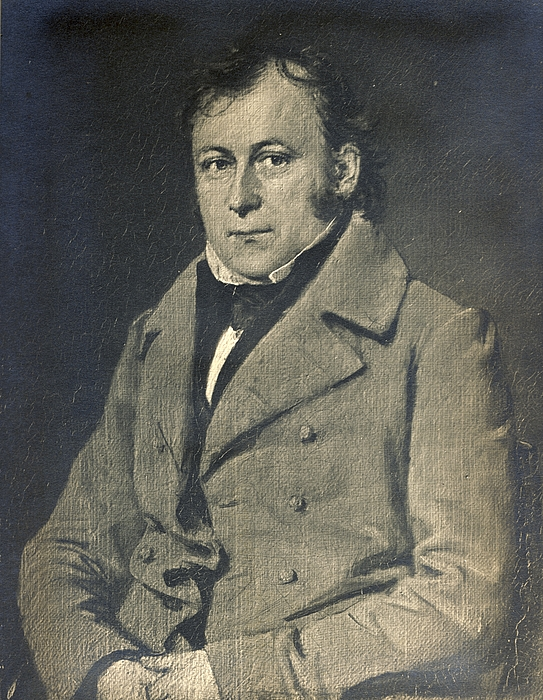
- C. A: Jensen: J. F. Schouw, 1836
- Born: 7 February 1789; Copenhagen, Denmark
- Died: 28 April 1852 (aged 63); Copenhagen, Denmark
- Education: University of Copenhagen
- Scientific career
- Fields: Lawyer, botanist

Joakim Frederik Schouw (7 February 1789 – 28 April 1852) was a Danish lawyer, botanist and politician. From 1821, professor in botany at the University of Copenhagen — first extraordinary professor, but after the death of J.W. Hornemann in 1841 ordinary. His main scientific field was the new discipline of phytogeography. He also served as director of Copenhagen Botanical Garden in 1841–1852. He was a leading figure in the National Liberal movement and president of the Danish Constituent Assembly in 1848.

== Early life ==
Schouw was born on 7 February 1789 in Copenhagen, the son of wine merchant Paul S. (1751–1800) and Sara Georgia Liebenberg (1761–1826). He studied law at the University of Copenhagen.

== Scientific career ==
He was already a lawyer when he in the summer of 1812 travelled to Norway with the Norwegian botanist Christen Smith. On this journey, he was strongly impressed with the conspicuous zonal division of the mountain vegetation and distribution of plant species in relation to altitude. Back in Copenhagen, he attended the lectures given by Martin Vahl and J.W. Hornemann. While earning for his living as a lawyer, he delved into the copious literature on plant geography, e.g. by Wahlenberg and von Humboldt. The first result of his efforts was a doctoral dissertation (1816): Dissertatio de sedibus plantarum originariis. In this thesis, he dealt with the question of Generatio aequivoca, that is the origin of species through continuous evolution, a view he advocated.

He was then given a travel grant to study phytogeography in Southern Europe and to visit A. P. de Candolle in Geneva. The expectations of his scientific potential were so great that King Frederik VI granted him an extraordinary professorship of botany at the University of Copenhagen. In 1822, his most significant contribution was published:

- Grundtræk til en almindelig Plantegeographie. Copenhagen, Gyldendalske Boghandels Forlag. German translation: Grundzüge einer allgemeinen Pflanzengeographie, Berlin 1823.

His later scientific contributions turned out to be rather meagre. He planned a great work and gathered material for it during two journeys to Italy. However, he never had time to continue his work. Together with Jens Vahl and Salomon Drejer, Schouw was the publisher of Flora Danica fasc. 38.

He succeeded Jens Wilken Hornemann as director of Copenhagen Botanical Garden in 1841–1852. In 1841, he was elected a foreign member of the Royal Swedish Academy of Sciences.

== Politics ==
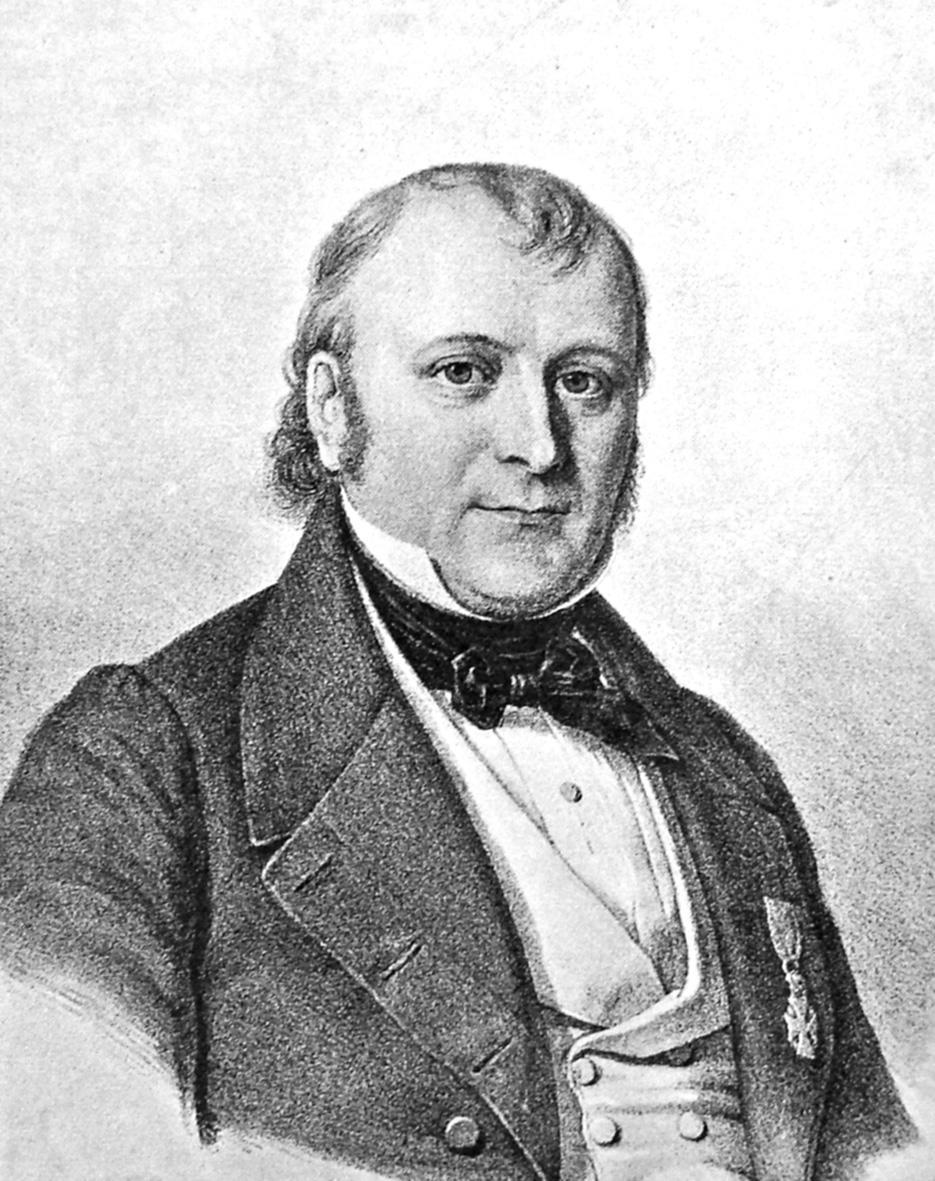
Joakim Frederik Schouw

In the 1830s and 1840s, Schouw was one of the main leaders of the political movement that led to the first democratic constitution of Denmark, the June Constitution of 1849. The king appointed him as a representative for the university for the first Roskilde Provincial Assembly in 1834 (a, a recognition of the growing importance of the liberal movement (but he belonged to the moderate wing), where he was immediately elected as its president with 37 votes against 18 votes to Lauritz Nicolai Hvidt and 11 votes to the Conservative bishop J. P. Münster. He was later reelected at Viborg Provincial Assembly with all votes against one and was reelected until 1840 when he was no longerappointed by the king, probably as a result of the government's discontent with his claim of the Provincial Assembly's independence. He was much engaged in Scandinavism and in the Schleswig-Holstein Question. He was a member of the 1848 Danish Constituent Assembly but refused to become a minister because he, unlike the government, favoured the division of Schleswig.

He published Dansk Ugeskrift in 1831–36 and again 1842–46, followed by Dansk Tidsskrift 1847–50.

== Personal life ==
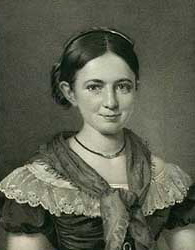
LPeter Gemzøe: Susette Dalgas

Schouw married Susanne (Susette) Marie Augustine Peschier Dalgas, (1798–1844), a daughter of priest at the French Reformed Church in Fredericia Jean Marc Dalgar (1756–1811). They first met each other in her brother Christian Dalgas' home in Livorno. Schouw's travel companion, Henrik Stampe, married another Dalgas sister, Christine, who was also there at the time. The wedding took place on 24 April 1827 in Christiansborg Chapel in Copenhagen.

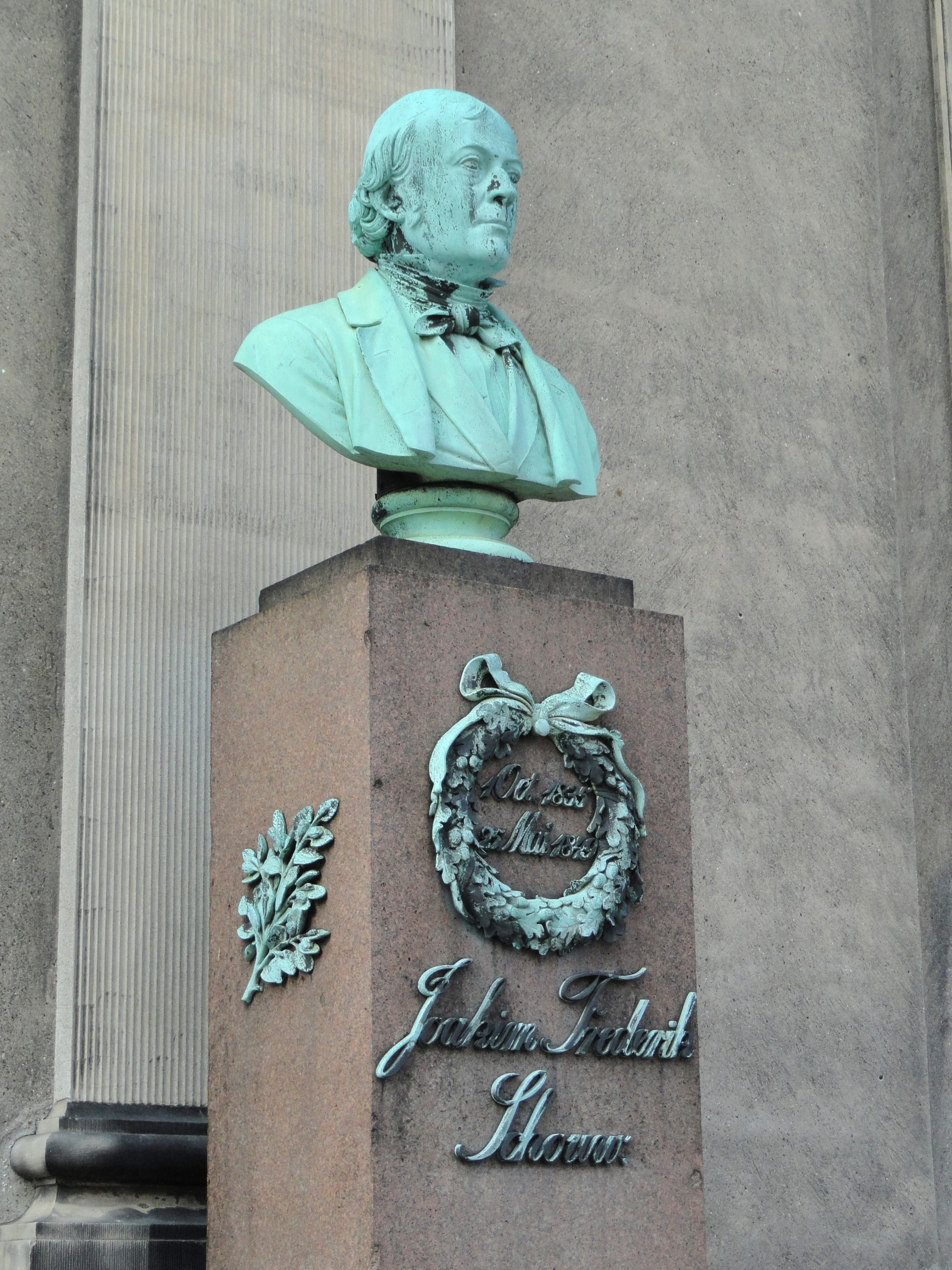
H. W. Bissen's bust of Schouw outside the University of Copenhagen's main building

Schouw had an official residence in Charlottenborg after his appointment to professor and director of the botanical garden in 1841. The botanical garden was then located next to the building. The lively Grundtvegian home was frequented by many visitors from the Danish world of culture, His daughter Georgia married the painter P. C. Skovgaard.

Schouw was a member of the Committee for the Establishment of Thorvaldsens Museum and served as one of the executors of Bertel Thorvaldsens will and gift letter to the city of Copenhagen. He was also a board member of the museum.

Herman Wilhelm Bissen created a bust of Schouw in 1851. A bronze cast of the bust was in 1856 installed outside the University of Copenhagen's main building on Frue Plads. It was the first sculpture of a non-aristocratic person in the public real in Copenhagen.

He died on 28 April 1852 and is buried at Assistens Cemetery.

== Honours ==
In 1896, botanist Augustin-Pyramus de Candolle published Schouwia, a monotypic genus of flowering plants from Northern Africa, belonging to the family Brassicaceae and named in Joakim Frederik Schouw's honor.

== Sources ==
Christensen, Carl (1932) Joakim Frederik Schouw, pp. 100–103 in: Meisen, V. Prominent Danish Scientists through the Ages. University Library of Copenhagen 450th Anniversary. Levin & Munksgaard, Copenhagen.
