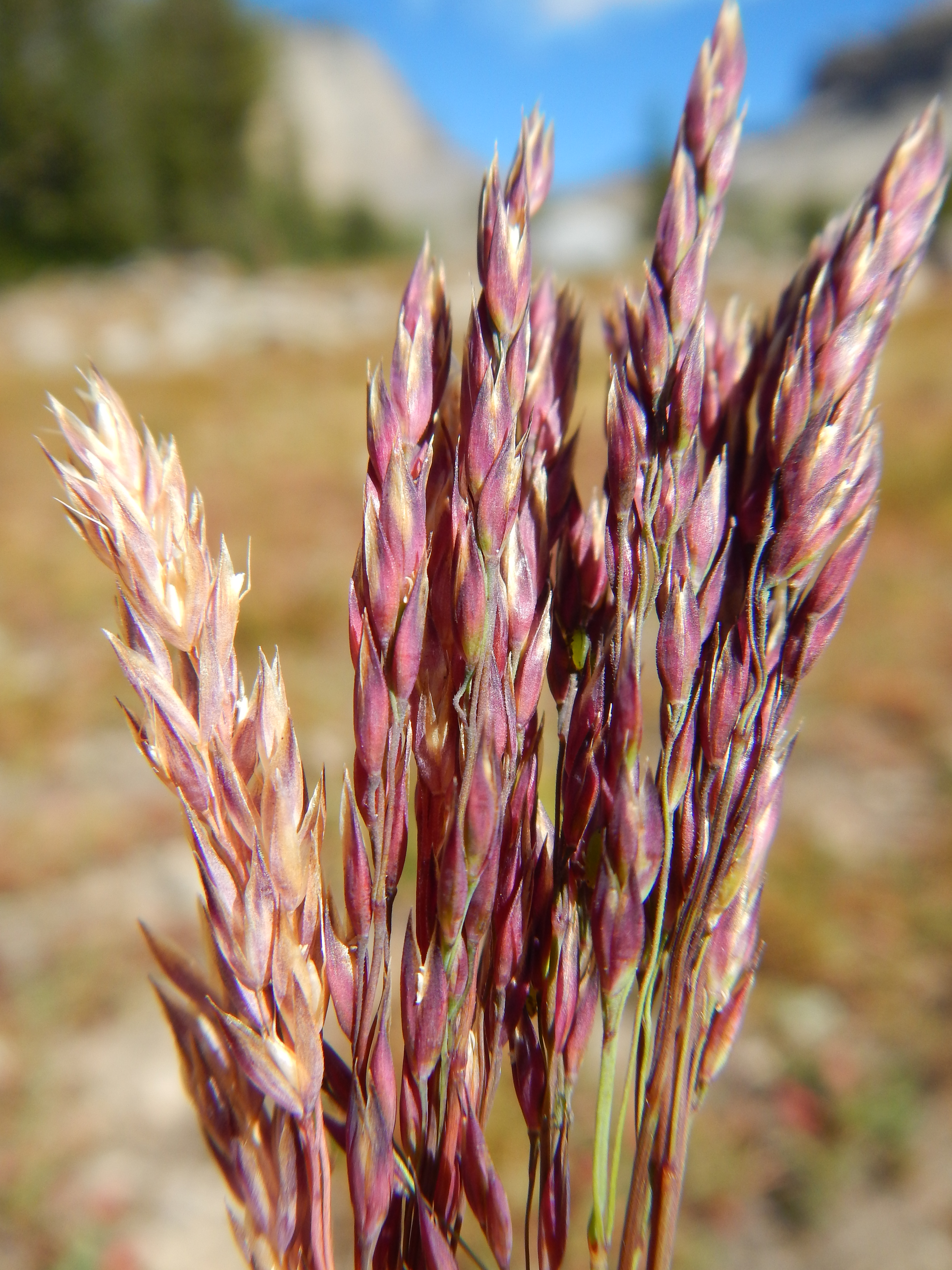

Scientific classification
- Kingdom: Plantae
- Clade: Embryophytes
- Clade: Tracheophytes
- Clade: Angiosperms
- Clade: Monocots
- Clade: Commelinids
- Order: Poales
- Family: Poaceae
- Subfamily: Pooideae
- Supertribe: Poodae
- Tribe: Poeae
- Subtribe: Holcinae
- Genus: Vahlodea; Fr.
- Species: V. atropurpurea

Binomial name
- Vahlodea atropurpurea (Wahlenb.) Fr.

Synonyms
- Aira alpina Vahl; Aira atropurpurea Wahlenb.; Aira atropurpurea var. magellanica (Hook.f.) Skottsb.; Aira latifolia Hook.; Aira magellanica Hook.f.; Avena atropurpurea (Wahlenb.) Link; Deschampsia atropurpurea (Wahlenb.) Scheele; Deschampsia atropurpurea var. minor Vasey; Deschampsia atropurpurea var. paramushirensis Kudô; Deschampsia atropurpurea subsp. paramushirensis (Kudô) T.Koyama; Deschampsia atropurpurea var. payettii Lepage; Deschampsia brachyphylla Phil.; Deschampsia hookeriana Scribn.; Deschampsia latifolia (Hook.) Vasey; Deschampsia pacifica Tatew. & Ohwi; Erioblastus paramushirensis (Kudô) Honda; Holcus atropurpureus (Wahlenb.) Wahlenb.; Vahlodea atropurpurea subsp. latifolia (Hook.) A.E.Porsild; Vahlodea atropurpurea var. patentissima Hultén; Vahlodea latifolia (Hook.) Hultén; Vahlodea latifolia subsp. paramushirensis (Kudô) Elven; Vahlodea magellanica (Hook.f.) Tzvelev; Vahlodea paramushirensis (Kudô) Roshev.

= Vahlodea =

Genus of flowering plants

Vahlodea is a monotypic genus of plants in the grass family. The only known species is Vahlodea atropurpurea (Wahlenb.) Fr.

Its native range is the subarctic (such as Greenland), to temperate parts of the Northern Hemisphere. From (Europe within; Finland, North European Russia, Norway and Sweden), to Asia within (Japan, Kamchatka, Kuril Islands, Magadan and Taiwan), and in North America (within the Canadian provinces of; Alberta, British Columbia, Manitoba, Newfoundland and Labrador, Northwest Territories, Nunavut, Ontario, Québec and Yukon and within the US states of Alaska, the Aleutian Islands, California, Colorado, Idaho, Maine, Montana, New Hampshire, New York, Oregon, Vermont, Washington and Wyoming), and also southern South America (within Argentina and Chile).

The genus name of Vahlodea is in honour of Jens Vahl (1796–1854), a Danish botanist and pharmacist. The Latin specific epithet of atropurpurea means "dark-purple coloured". Both the genus and the sole species were first described and published in Bot. Not. (1842) Vol.141 on page 178 in 1842.

The genus is recognized by the United States Department of Agriculture and the Agricultural Research Service, and they list Vahlodea atropurpurea as the known species.

It was thought to be a synonym of Deschampsia P. Beauv., but a 2007 molecular phylogenetic study supported the recognition of Avenella and Vahlodea.
