= Morten Wormskjold =

Danish botanist and explorer (1783–1845)

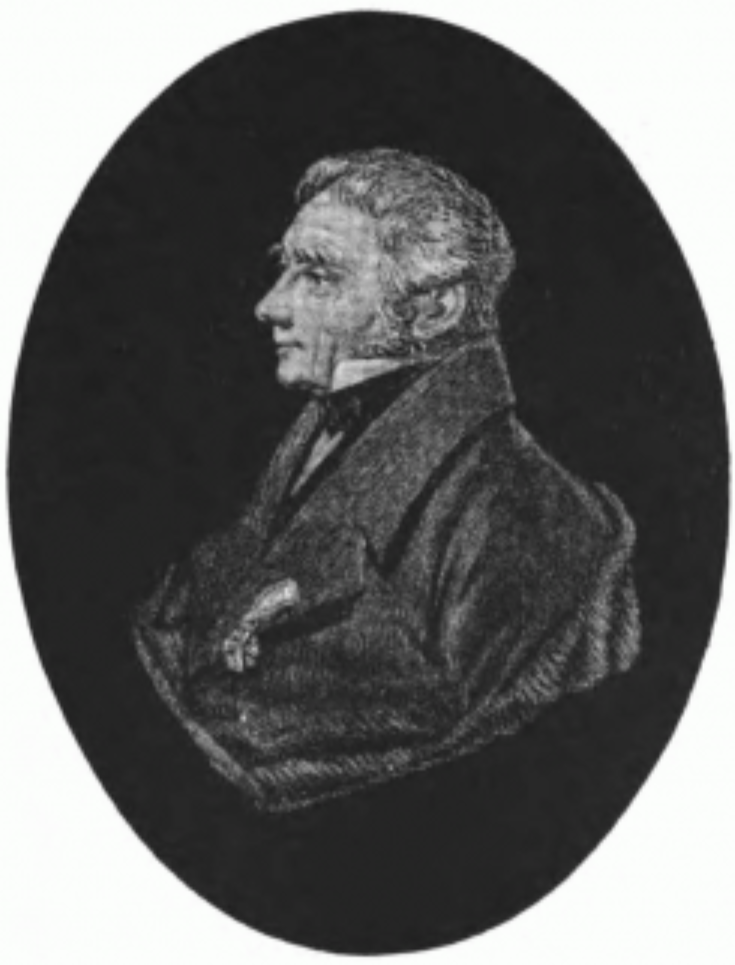
Morten Wormskjold

Morten Wormskjold (16 January 1783 – 29 November 1845) was a Danish botanist and explorer. He collected plants in Greenland and Kamchatka. The standard author abbreviation Wormsk. is used to indicate this person as the author when citing a botanical name.

== Early life ==
Morten Wormskjold was born in Copenhagen to a recently nobilitated family of civil servants in the Danish state administration. His parents were Peder Wormskiold (1750–1824), a royal councilor, and Margrethe M. de Teilman (1757–1837). He received private tuition and graduated in law in 1805. He then studied botany under professor J. W. Hornemann at the University of Copenhagen. In 1807, he accompanied Hornemann and the Norwegian botanist Christen Smith on a trip to Norway to collect plant specimens to support descriptions and form the basis of illustrations intended for the grand plate work Flora Danica, at that time edited by Hornemann. The two Danes had to leave Norway due to the Napoleonic Wars and no specimen seemed to have been preserved from the trip.

== Greenland ==
In 1812–1813, Wormskjold made a botanical collection trip to Greenland via Leith near Edinburgh. The mineralogist Karl Ludwig Giesecke was meant to be his local contact. The vessel, Freden, was delayed for a month in Leith. Wormskjold used that time to follow lectures in geology by Robert Jameson and Daniel Rutherford. He also got acquainted with Ninian Imrie and Thomas Allan, who had bought a party of minerals shipped by Giesecke, but confiscated by the Royal Navy. During his stay in Greenland, he made observations and collections of molluscs and plants. His observations were communicated in letters and his Botanisk Journal only published in 1889 by Eugenius Warming. He had found 157 species of vascular plants, which more than doubled the known number.

== Rurik expedition and Kamchatka ==
In 1815, back in Copenhagen, he got the opportunity to join the Russian expedition on the circumnavigational expeditionary ship Rurik commanded by Otto von Kotzebue. The other naturalists in the crew were the poet and botanist Adelbert von Chamisso and the physician and zoologist Johann Friedrich von Eschscholtz. For some reason, he and Captain Kotzebue fell out and Wormskjold left the expedition in Petropavlovsk on Kamchatka in 1816. He remained there for the next two years, collecting many specimens, and left in 1818. However, due to misfortune in 1842 – a devastating fire – almost all specimens still in his possession, together with valuable journals and notes, were destroyed. Some specimens are preserved at the Botanical Museum and Library in Copenhagen and the University of Oslo. After his return, he gave up natural history and lived with relatives. He died at Gavnø Castle and was buried at the nearby Vejlø Church.

== Honours ==
He was given the Order of the Dannebrog shortly before he—as the first Dane—completed his circumnavigation. The marine green alga Urospora wormskioldii (Mart in Honem.) Rosenv., the flowering plant genus Wormskioldia Thonn. (Turneraceae) and several other species are named for him, e.g. Trifolium wormskioldii and Veronica wormskjoldii.

== Sources ==
- Jessen, Peter (1987). Morten Wormskjold. Den glemte opdagelsesrejsende: En oversigt over hans forskerindsats og en bibliografi [Morten Wormskjold - the forgotten explorer] (in Danish). Agitryk.; piecing together Wormskjold's lost diary from his numerous letters, many of which themselves copied from diary entries.
