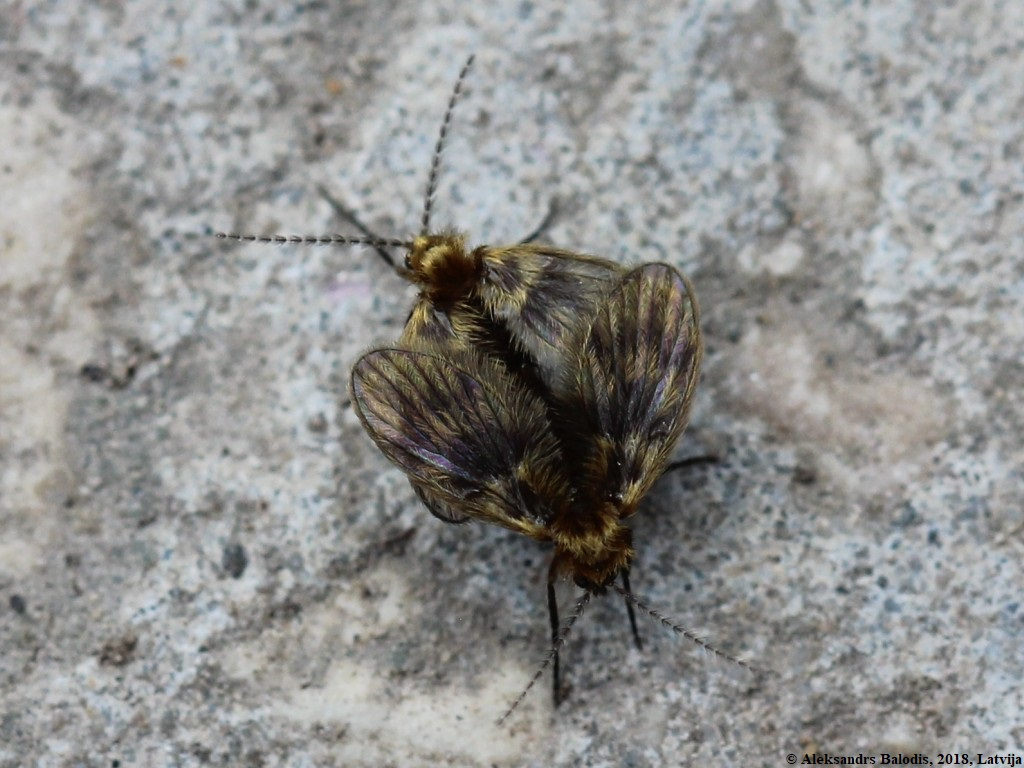
- Adult of Trichomyia urbica

Scientific classification
- Kingdom: Animalia
- Phylum: Arthropoda
- Class: Insecta
- Order: Diptera
- Family: Psychodidae
- Subfamily: Trichomyiinae
- Genus: Trichomyia; Haliday, 1839

= Trichomyia =

Genus of moth flies

Trichomyia is a cosmopolitan genus of moth flies in the subfamily Trichomyiinae (family Psychodidae), and is the only extant genus in the subfamily. The genus has received increased taxonomic attention in recent years, particularly in the Neotropics, but phylogenetic analyses of its species remain limited. Consequently, classification within the genus has historically been challenging due to its high diversity and morphological variability.

== Introduction ==
Trichomyiinae comprises five recognized genera, but only Trichomyia contains living species. Previous studies using morphological or molecular data have not fully resolved the monophyly of the genus, although molecular evidence from a subset of species supports its monophyly. Historically, Duckhouse (1965, 1978) divided Trichomyia into two informal groups, 'Group A' and 'Group B', based on the number of palp segments and the presence of sensory structures. However, this classification is considered artificial in modern taxonomy, and many species do not fit cleanly into these groups.

Eight subgenera have been proposed for Trichomyia: Gondwanotrichomyia, Apotrichomyia, Dactylotrichomyia, Dicrotrichomyia, Septemtrichomyia, Opisthotrichomyia, Syntrichomyia, and Brachiotrichomyia. Despite this, a substantial number of species have not been assigned to any subgenus.

== Ecology and distribution ==
Trichomyia species are widely distributed across all continents. Many species occur in Neotropical regions, while others are found in the Nearctic, Palearctic, Australian, Oriental, and Ethiopian regions. Larval habitats are generally associated with moist substrates. In the genus Trichomyia (subfamily Trichomyiinae), larvae are elongated and adapted for boring into decaying wood with robust mandibles.
