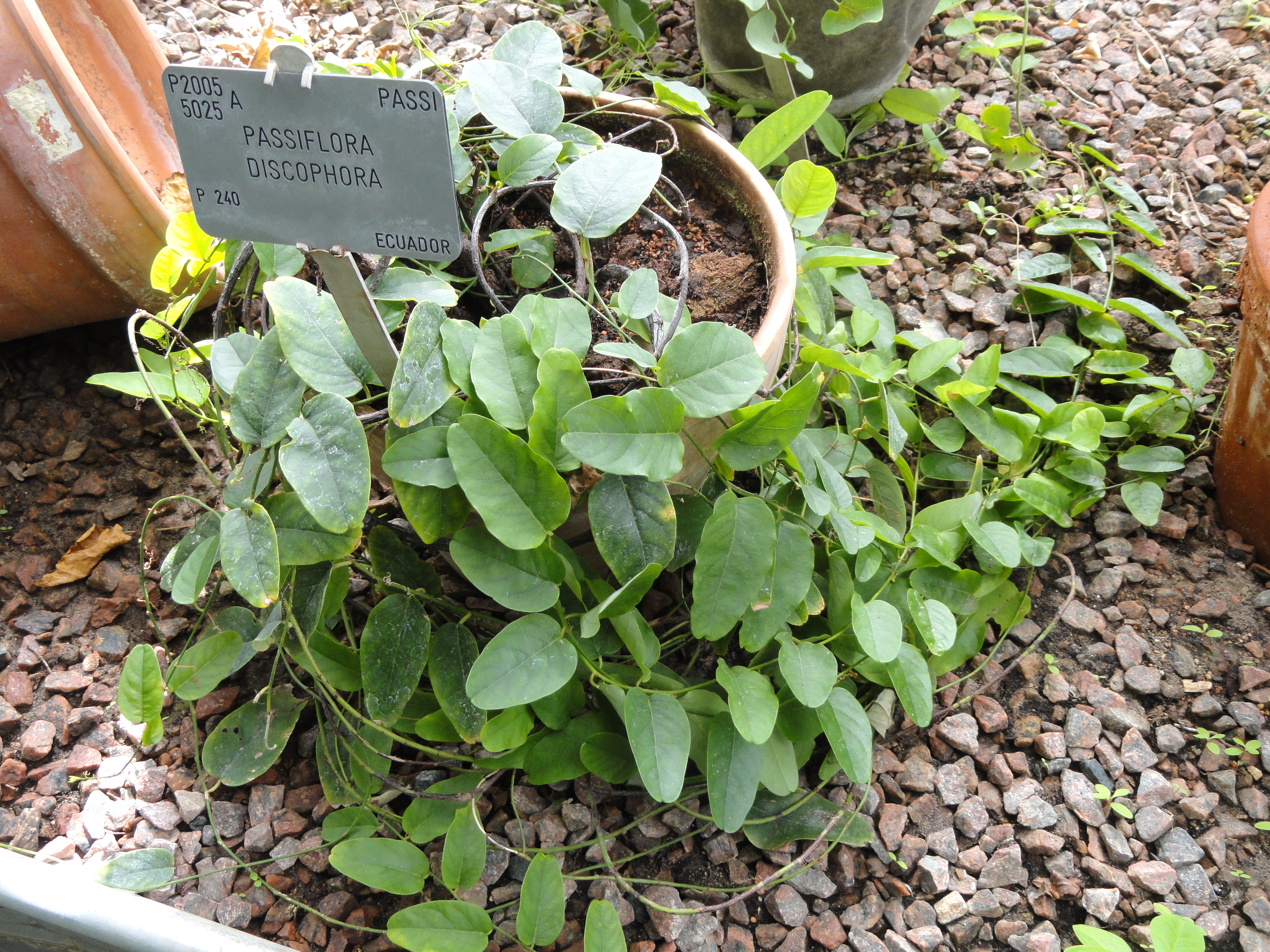
- Passiflora discophora cultivated in the Copenhagen Botanical Garden

Conservation status
- Endangered (IUCN 3.1)

Scientific classification
- Kingdom: Plantae
- Clade: Tracheophytes
- Clade: Angiosperms
- Clade: Eudicots
- Clade: Rosids
- Order: Malpighiales
- Family: Passifloraceae
- Genus: Passiflora
- Species: P. discophora

Binomial name
- Passiflora discophora P. Jørg. & Lawesson
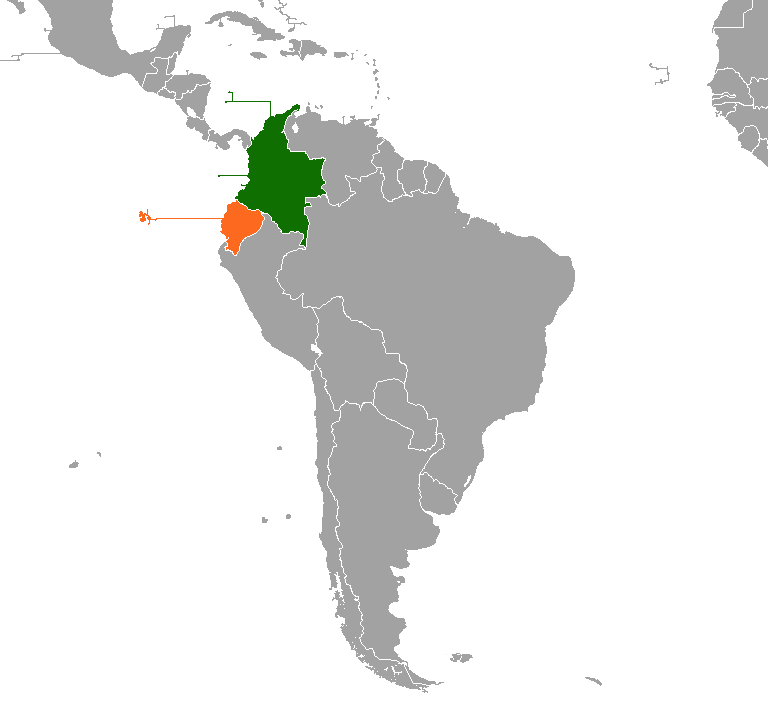
- It is native to Ecuador and Colombia

= Passiflora discophora =

Species of vine

Passiflora discophora is a species of plant In the family Passifloraceae, native to western Ecuador and Colombia. It is restricted to closed wet coastal forest, and considered endangered due to the rapid ongoing deforestation of Ecuador's coast.

== Description ==
=== Vegetative characteristics ===
Passiflora discophora is a liana. The branched tendrils form adhesive pads at the apex. The leaves are relatively small.

=== Generative characteristics ===
The flowers are 4 cm wide.

=== Adhesive pads ===
It is highly unusual among the genus Passiflora in regard of its climbing strategy. Unlike most other members of the genus, it forms branched tendrils with terminal adhesive pads. After surface contact of the tendrils, multiple adhesive pads are formed by papillate cell proliferation of the apex and a callus is formed, which perfectly reflects the microtopology of the substrate. In addition adhesive substances are secreted, which ensures persisting anchorage even after the tissue has died. The tendrils coil after adhesion, providing a firm support to the climbing plant. The functional principles of these structures have been used as inspiration for engineering of similar materials.

== Taxonomy ==
It was published by Peter Møller Jørgensen and Jonas Erik Lawesson in 1987. It is placed in the subgenus Passiflora subg. Deidamioides.

=== Etymology ===
The specific epithet discophora refers to the adhesive pads of the tendrils.

== Ecology ==
The fruits are eaten by birds, which disperse the seeds.
