= Maruina =

Scientific classification
- Domain: Eukaryota
- Kingdom: Animalia
- Phylum: Arthropoda
- Class: Insecta
- Order: Diptera
- Family: Psychodidae
- Subfamily: Psychodinae
- Tribe: Maruinini
- Genus: Maruina; Müller, 1895

Type species
- Maruina pilosella Müller, 1895

Genus of flies

Maruina is a genus of moth flies in the family Psychodidae. There are at least 30 described species in Maruina. marui, diminutive for a fly.

== Species ==
- Maruina amada Hogue, 1973
- Maruina amadora Hogue, 1973
- Maruina barrettoi Bravo, 2005
- Maruina bellaca Hogue, 1973
- Maruina boulderina Vaillant, 1963
- Maruina caceresi Wagner, 1988
- Maruina cachita Hogue, 1973
- Maruina campesina Hogue, 1973
- Maruina chaborra Hogue, 1973
- Maruina chamaca Hogue, 1973
- Maruina chamaquita Hogue, 1973
- Maruina chica Hogue, 1973
- Maruina chiringa Hogue, 1990
- Maruina cholita Hogue, 1973
- Maruina cirrata Bravo & Araújo, 2018
- Maruina colombicana Wagner & Joost, 1994
- Maruina dama Hogue, 1973
- Maruina doncella Hogue, 1973
- Maruina duckhousei Bravo, 2005
- Maruina garota Hogue, 1973
- Maruina guria Bravo, 2004
- Maruina hirta Johannsen, 1938
- Maruina hoguei Wagner, 1993
- Maruina jezeki Bravo, 2005
- Maruina lanceolata (Kincaid, 1899)
- Maruina menina Bravo & Lago, 2004
- Maruina mollesi Vaillant, 1989
- Maruina muchacha Hogue, 1973
- Maruina mucugensis Bravo & Araújo, 2018
- Maruina namorada Hogue, 1973
- Maruina nina Hogue, 1973
- Maruina pebeta Ibáñez-Bernal, 1994
- Maruina pennaki Vaillant, 1963
- Maruina pilosella Müller, 1895
- Maruina querida Hogue, 1973
- Maruina spinosa Müller, 1895
- Maruina tica Hogue, 1973
- Maruina tobagensis Wagner, 1993
- Maruina ursula Müller, 1895
- Maruina vidamia Hogue, 1973
