= Maruina lanceolata =

Scientific classification
- Kingdom: Animalia
- Phylum: Arthropoda
- Class: Insecta
- Order: Diptera
- Family: Psychodidae
- Genus: Maruina
- Species: M. lanceolata

Binomial name
- Maruina lanceolata (Kincaid, 1899)

Synonyms
- Sycorax lanceolata Kincaid, 1899; Pericoma californiensis Kellogg, 1901; Trichomyia anipunctata Haseman, 1907

Species of fly

Maruina lanceolata is a species of moth flies in the family Psychodidae.
