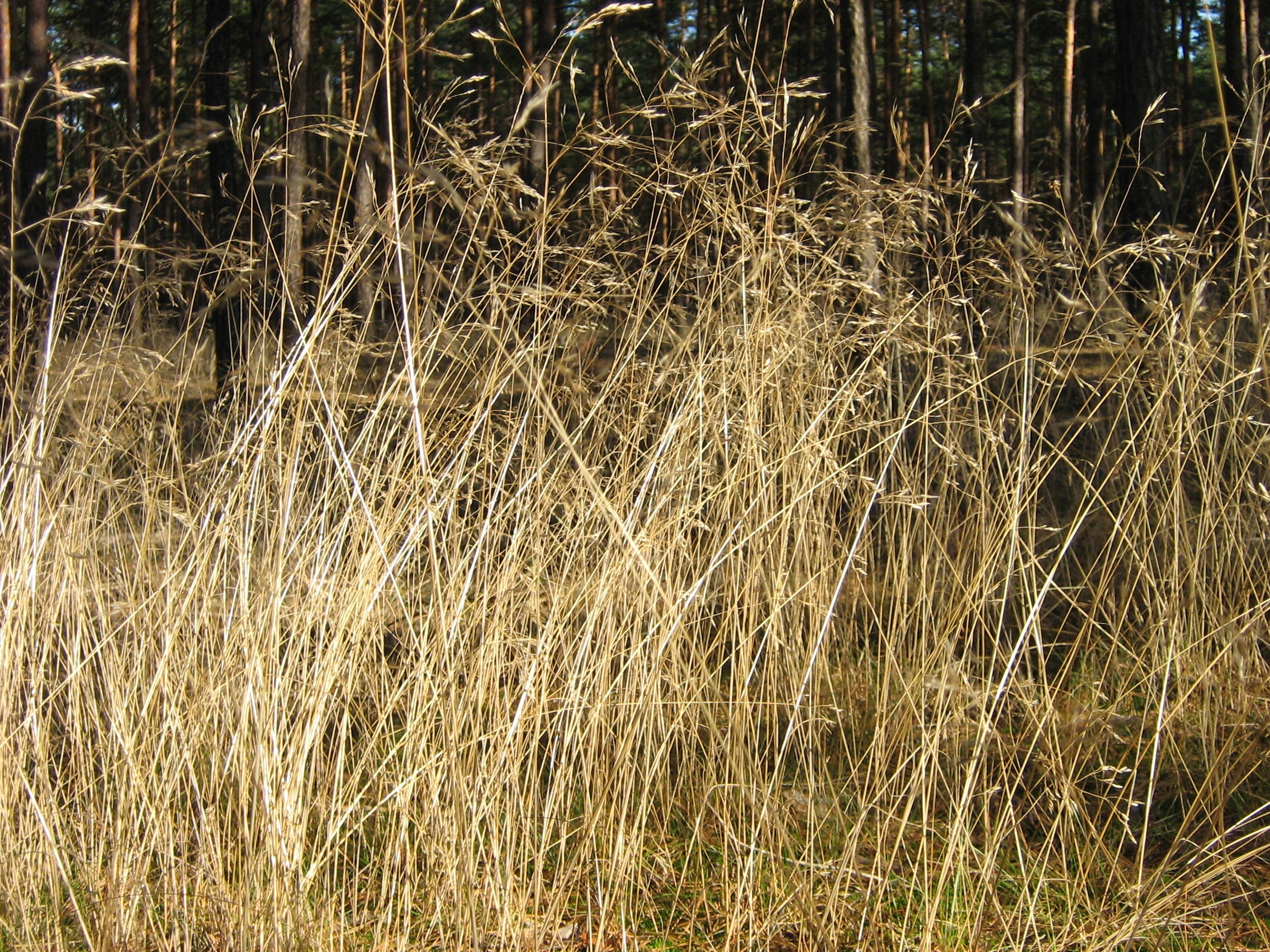

Scientific classification
- Kingdom: Plantae
- Clade: Tracheophytes
- Clade: Angiosperms
- Clade: Monocots
- Clade: Commelinids
- Order: Poales
- Family: Poaceae
- Subfamily: Pooideae
- Genus: Avenella
- Species: A. flexuosa

Binomial name
- Avenella flexuosa (L.) Drejer.

Synonyms
- List: Aira flexuosa L.; Arundo flexuosa (L.) Clairv.; Avena flexuosa (L.) Mert. & W.D.J.Koch; Deschampsia flexuosa (L.) Trin; Lerchenfeldia flexuosa (L.) Schur; Podionapus flexuosus (L.) Dulac; Salmasia flexuosa (L.) Bubani; Aira montana L.; Avena montana (L.) Weber; Aira caryophyllaea Leers; Aira arenaria F.W.Schmidtn.; Aira flexilis L. ex Giseke; Aira scabrosetacea Knapp; Aira versicolor Roem. & Schult.; Deschampsia alba Roem. & Schult.; Eriachne montana Steud.; Panicum rubigerum Steud.; Aira alpina Sobol. ex Rupr.; Avenella cuprina Schur; Aira vestita Steud.; Aira legei Boreau; Lerchenfeldia cuprina Schur; Aira euflexuosa Syme; Deschampsia stricta Hack.; Aira stricta (Hack.) Nyman; Aira collina (Dumort.) B.D.Jacks.; Deschampsia fuegina Phil.; Deschampsia martinii Phil.; Deschampsia tenella Phil.; Avena kawakamii Hayata; Deschampsia philippii Macloskie; Deschampsia ruwensorensis Chiov.; Deschampsia macloviana Gand.; Deschampsia montana (L.) Rouy; Deschampsia vestita (Steud.) Hauman & Parodi; Deschampsia kawakamii (Hayata) Honda; Deschampsia mairei Sennen; Lerchenfeldia vestita (Steud.) Tzvelev; Avenella stricta (Hack.) P.Silva; Lerchenfeldia montana (L.) A.P.Khokhr.; Avenella corsica (Tausch) Landolt

= Avenella flexuosa =

Species of grass

Avenella flexuosa, commonly known as wavy hair-grass, is a species of bunchgrass in the grass family widely distributed in Eurasia, Africa, South America, and North America.

== Description ==
Wavy hair-grass, Avenella flexuosa, has wiry leaves and delicate, shaking panicles formed of silvery or purplish-brown flower heads on wavy, hair-like stalks. The leaves are bunched in tight tufts with plants forming a very tussocky, low sward 5 to 20 cm tall before flowering, to 30 cm high.

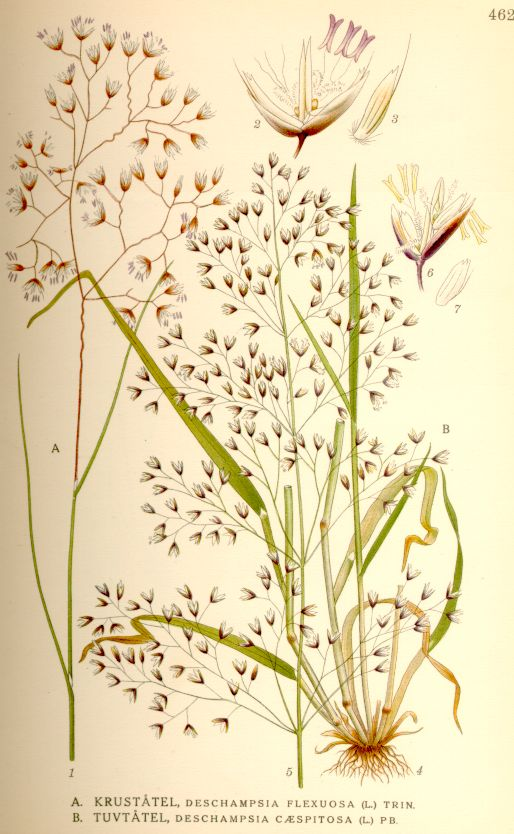
Illustration of Deschampsia flexuosa (including D. caespitosa)

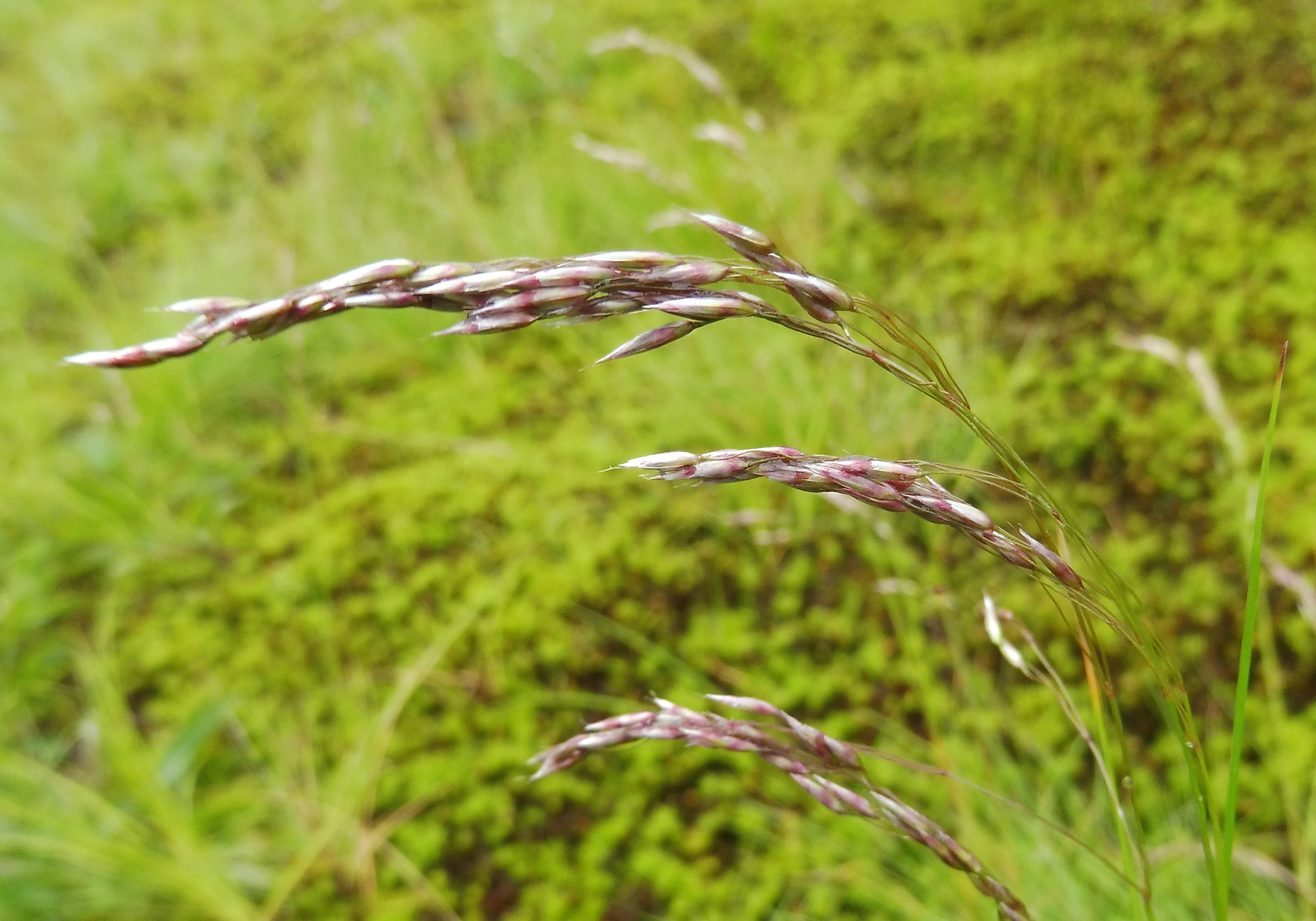
Mature inflorescence

== Distribution and habitat ==
Avenella flexuosa is found naturally in dry grasslands and on moors and heaths.

It is also an important component of the ground flora of birch and oak woodland.

The plant has a preference for acidic, free-draining soil, and avoids chalk and limestone areas. It can exist over 1,200 metres (3,900 ft) above sea level.

== See also ==
- Woodland and scrub communities in the British National Vegetation Classification system—birch and oak woodland
