= Salomon Drejer =

Danish botanist (1813–1842)

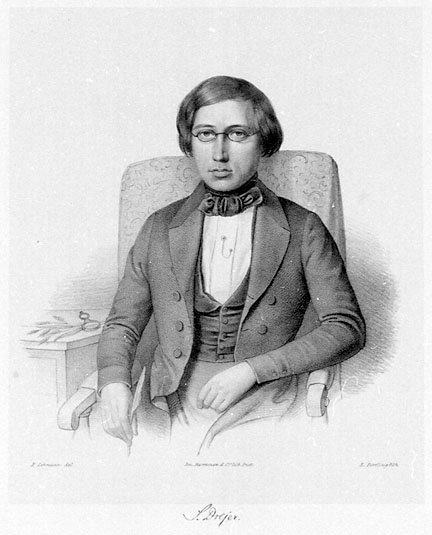
Salomon Drejer (1813-1842)

Salomon Thomas Nicolai Drejer (15 February 1813 in Eveldrup, Viborg – 21 April 1842 in Copenhagen) was a Danish botanist. He was a friend of Japetus Steenstrup.

He was recognized as an expert on sedges, being credited with describing numerous species within the genus Carex. Together with Jens Vahl and Joakim Frederik Schouw, Salomon Drejer was the publisher of Flora Danica fasc. 38.

Two plant genera have been named in his honour:

- Drejerella, Lindau in Acanthaceae.
- Drejera, Nees in Acanthaceae.

== Published works ==
- Flora excursoria hafniensis, (1838).
- Laerebog i den botaniske terminologie og systemlaere, (1839).
- Elementa phyllologiae, (1840).
- Revisio critica Caricum borealium in terris sub imperio Danico jacentibus inventarum, (1841).
- Symbolae Caricologicae ad synonymiam Caricum extricandum stabiliendamque et affinitates naturales eruendas, (1844).
