= Schouwia =

Scientific classification
- Kingdom: Plantae
- Clade: Tracheophytes
- Clade: Angiosperms
- Clade: Eudicots
- Clade: Rosids
- Order: Brassicales
- Family: Brassicaceae
- Genus: Schouwia; DC.
- Species: S. purpurea

Binomial name
- Schouwia purpurea (Forssk.) Schweinf.

Synonyms
- Cyclopterygium Hochst.; Subularia Forssk.; Cyclopterygium breviseptum Hochst.; Cyclopterygium longiseptum Hochst.; Psychine arabica (Vahl) Spreng.; Schouwia arabica (Vahl) DC.; Schouwia brassicifolia Jaub. & Spach; Schouwia brevisepta Hochst.; Schouwia glastifolia Jaub. & Spach; Schouwia purpurea f. albiflora Maire; Schouwia schimperi Jaub. & Spach; Schouwia thebaica Webb; Subularia purpurea Forssk.; Thlaspi arabicum Vahl

Species of flowering plant

Schouwia is a monotypic genus of flowering plants belonging to the family Brassicaceae. It only contains one known species, Schouwia purpurea (Forssk.) Schweinf.

Its native range is Sahara and Sahel to the Arabian Peninsula (Palestine and Saudi Arabia). It is found in the African countries of Algeria, Burkina, Chad, Djibouti, Egypt, Ethiopia, Libya, Mali, Mauritania, Morocco, Niger, Somalia, Sudan, and Yemen.

The genus name of Schouwia is in honour of Joakim Frederik Schouw (1789–1852), a Danish lawyer, botanist and politician. From 1821, he was a professor in botany at the University of Copenhagen. The genus has 2 known synoyms; Cyclopterygium Hochst. and Subularia Forssk. The Latin specific epithet of purpurea means purplish or purple-like. It was first described and published in Syst. Nat. Vol.2 on page 643 in 1821. Then the species was published in Bull. Herb. Boissier Vol.4 (App. 2) on page 183 in 1896.
