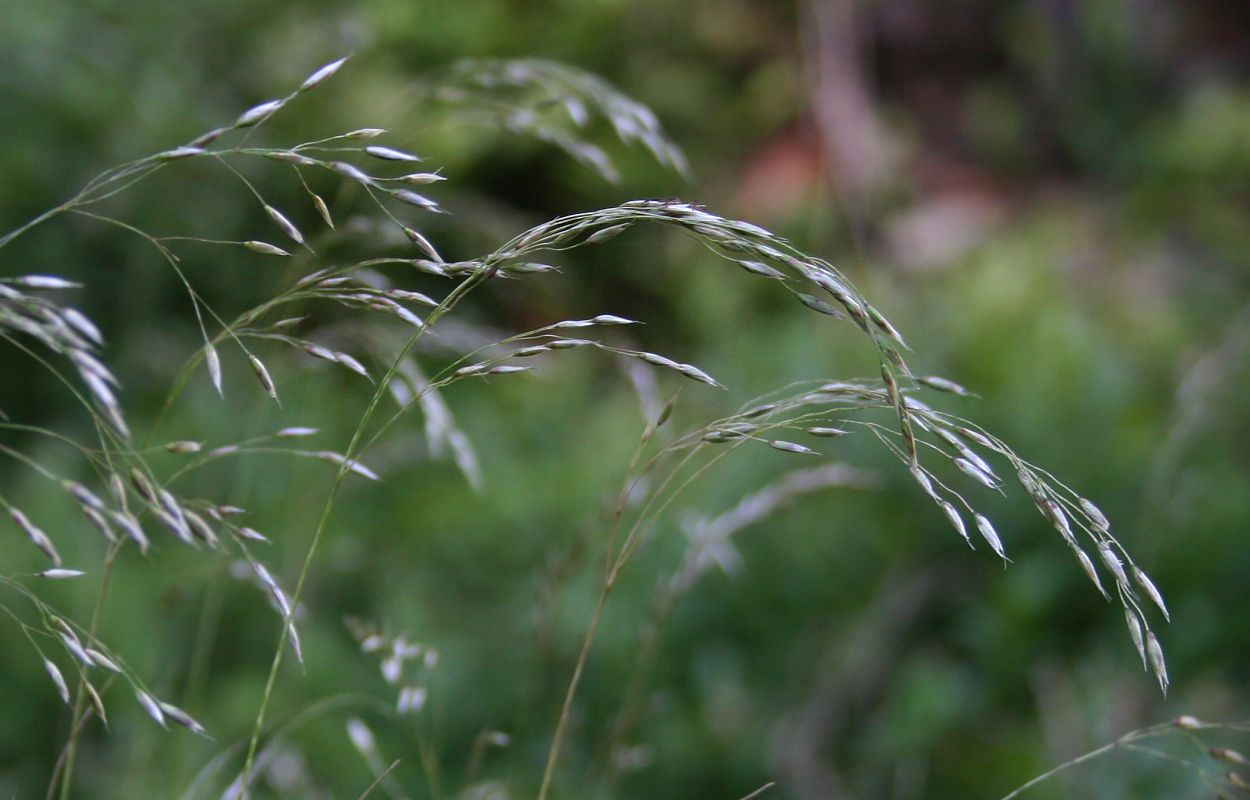
- Avenella flexuosa

Scientific classification
- Kingdom: Plantae
- Clade: Tracheophytes
- Clade: Angiosperms
- Clade: Monocots
- Clade: Commelinids
- Order: Poales
- Family: Poaceae
- Subfamily: Pooideae
- Supertribe: Poodae
- Tribe: Poeae
- Subtribe: Airinae
- Genus: Avenella; Bluff ex Drejer

Synonyms
- Lerchenfeldia Schur

= Avenella =

Genus of grasses

Avenella is a genus of grasses. It contains two species, widely distributed in temperate regions of Eurasia, North America, South America, and northwest Africa, and tropical mountains in east-central Africa and Malesia.

- Avenella flexuosa (L.) Drejer
- Avenella foliosa (Hack.) Rivas Mart., Lousã, Fern.Prieto, E.Días, J.C.Costa
