= Georg Christian Oeder =

German-Danish botanist of the 18th century

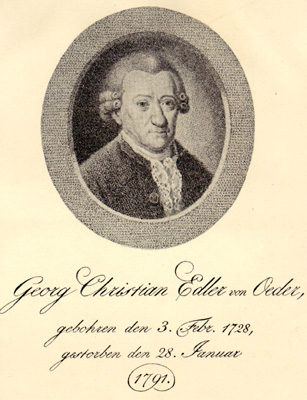
Georg Christian Oeder (copperplate 1793)

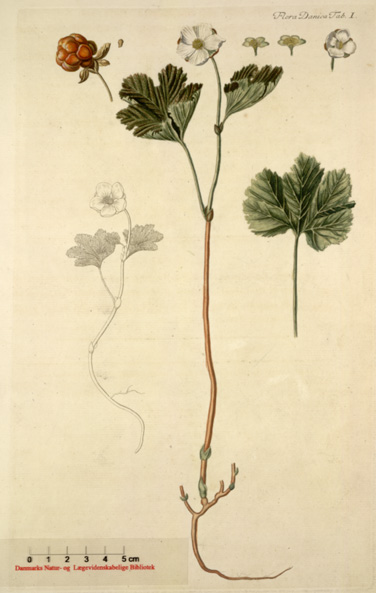
Plate 1 from Flora Danica fasc. 1 (1761); hand-coloured copperplate

Georg Christian Edler von Oldenburg Oeder (3 February 1728 – 28 January 1791) was a German-Danish botanist, medical doctor, economist and social reformer. His name is particularly associated with the initiation of the plate work Flora Danica.

== Life and work ==
Oeder was born in Ansbach to a Bavarian parish minister and theologian, Georg Ludwig Oeder (1694–1760). He studied medicine at the University of Göttingen under Albrecht von Haller. He then settled as a doctor of medicine in the city of Schleswig. The king called him to Copenhagen in 1751, on von Haller's recommendation. The autonomous – and conservative - University of Copenhagen, reluctant as it was to employ foreign experts, resisted Oeder's appointment in an ordinary chair. Thus, he was appointed Professor botanices regius (Royal Professor) and soon led the installation of a new botanic garden. From 1753 he led the publication of a monumental botanical plate work, Flora Danica, which at first was planned to cover all plants, including bryophytes, lichens and fungi native to crown lands of the Danish king – Denmark, Schleswig-Holstein, Oldenburg-Delmenhorst and Norway – with its North Atlantic dependencies Iceland, the Faroe Islands and Greenland. Oeder visited the mountain regions of Norway up to Trondheim during the years 1758–1760. Consequently, the first fascicles of Flora Danica contain many alpine plant species. Oeder also corresponded with the Norwegian bishop and botanist Johan Ernst Gunnerus during the time. Oeder also built up a considerable botanical library, mainly through purchase from colleagues abroad. English and American literature was obtained from Philip Miller of Chelsea Physic Garden and as many as 1327 volumes were bought from the estate of Richard Mead in 1754.

At the time of Oeder, botany was amalgamated with economy at large. Oeder thus was also a member of a number of commissions on agrarian reforms (e.g. “Landkommissionen” in 1770) and state finances ('Finanskollegiet' in 1771). From the first Danish census, which was soon destroyed, he extracted data on married couples, widowers and widows in all parishes of Zealand, Amager, Møn and Bornholm – these excerpts are now valuable data to genealogists. Oeder advocated the need for charities for widows. At large, Oeder was a spokesman of social reform and freedom of the rural population.

With the fall of Johann Friedrich Struensee in 1771 and the consequent crisis in state finances and the strengthening of anti-enlightenment and anti-German conservative circles, Oeder lost his professorship. He was first given the post as prefect (stiftamtmand) of Trondhjem stift, but never installed. He then was given a little honorable post as bailiff (Landvogt) in Oldenburg, which was then under Danish rule, but to be exchanged to Holstein-Gottorp in 1773. Two years before his death, he was ennobled by emperor Joseph II. He died in Oldenburg and was buried in the churchyard of St. Gertrude's Chapel (Gertrudenfriedhof).

== Plant taxa named for Oeder ==
The plant genus Oedera L. was named to his honour. A number of species have been named similarly, e.g. Pedicularis oederi Vahl and Carex oederi Retz.
