= Johan Lange =

Danish botanist (1818–1898)

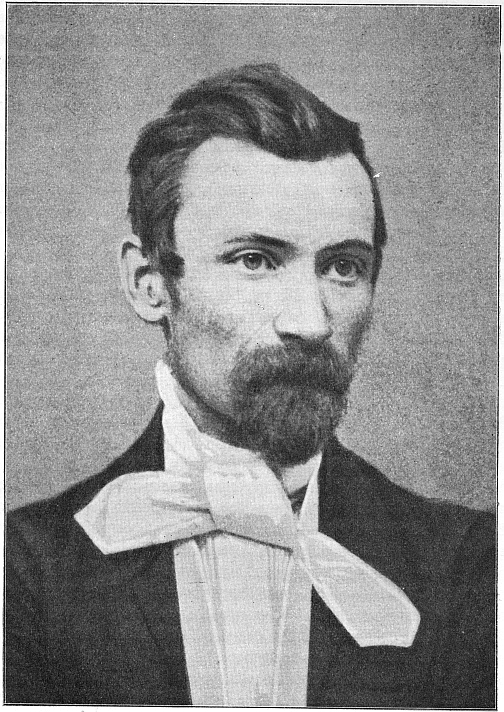
- Born: 20 March 1818; Ødstedgård near Vejle, Denmark
- Died: 3 April 1898 (aged 80); Copenhagen
- Education: University of Copenhagen
- Known for: Flora Danica, Prodromus Florae Hispanicae and four editions a Flora of Denmark
- Scientific career
- Fields: botany
- Workplaces: University of Copenhagen

Johan Martin Christian Lange (20 March 1818 – 3 April 1898) was a prominent Danish botanist.

He held the post of Librarian at the Botanical library of the University of Copenhagen from 1851 to 1858. He was Director of the Botanical Garden there from 1856 to 1876, the Reader of botany at the Danish Technical University from 1857 to 1862, and Reader of Botany at the Royal Veterinary and Agricultural University from 1858 to 1893, achieving full professor standing in 1892. He began editing the Flora Danica in 1858, and was its last editor. Together with Japetus Steenstrup, Johan Lange was the publisher of Flora Danica fasc. 44 (1858). Thereafter, he edited alone fasc. 45-51 (1861–83) and Supplement vols 2-3 (1865–74), in total 600 plates. After having finished the publication of Flora Danica, he issued Nomenclator Floræ Danicæ in 1887 - a volume indexing all planches in Flora Danica alphabetically, systematically and chronologically. Lange edited the exsiccata Plantae Europae australis 1851-52.

He travelled throughout Europe, completing extensive studies on the flora of Denmark, Greenland and other European countries, especially Spain. (Willkomm & Lange, Prodromus Florae Hispanicae, 1861–80).

He expanded on the classification developed by Linnaeus, writing Plantenavne og navngivningsregler (Plant-names and rules for name-giving) which was influential in developing the Code of Botanical Nomenclature, the system in use today.

Charles Darwin borrowed a book written by Lange, which he failed to return in a timely manner, as mentioned by Darwin in his correspondence.

He is honoured in the naming of a fungal genus in 1891, Willkommlangea (jointly with Heinrich Moritz Willkomm (1821-1895), who was a German academic and botanist).

== Partial list of publications ==
- Moritz Willkomm and Johan Lange (1861–1880). Prodromus florae hispanicae, seu synopsis methodica omnium plantarum in Hispania.
- Icones plantarum sponte nascentium in regnis Daniae et Norvegiae, in ducatibus Slesvici et Holsatiae et in comitatibus Oldenburgi et Delmenhorstiae: (Pictures of the plants growing wild in the kingdoms of Denmark and Norway, in the duchy of Schleswig-Holstein, and in the principalities of Oldenburg and Delmenhorst)
- Beretning om Universitetets botaniske Have for Aarene 1867-68. 1870.
- Beretning om Universitetets botaniske Have for Aarene 1871-73. 1874.
- Conspectus florae groenlandicae: Grønlands mosser (Muscineae) (Overview of the mosses of Greenland)
- Conspectus florae groenlandicae: 1. Fanerogamer og karsporeplanter (Overview of the vascular plants of Greenland)
- Conspectus florae groenlandicae: Tillæg til fanerogamerne og karsporeplanterne (Overview of the plants of Greenland, Supplement to vascular plants)
- Descriptio iconibus ilustrata plantarum novarum. 1864–1866.
- Flora Danica
- Haandbog i den danske flora. 1851.
- Nomenclator "Florae Danicae;" sive, Index systematicus et alphabeticus operis quod "Icones florae Danicae" inscribitur, cum enumeratione tabularum ordinem temporum habente, adiectis notis criticis. 1887.
- Pugillus plantarum imprimis Hispanicarum, quas in itinere 1851-52 legit Joh. Lange.
- "Udvalg af de i Universitetets botaniske og andre Haver iagttagne nye Arter". Botanisk Tidsskrift. 19: 255–268. 1895.
- Revisio Specierum Generis Crataegi Imprimis Earum, Quae in Hortis Daniae Coluntur: Oversigt over de i Danmark Haardføre Arter af Hvidtyørn-Slaegten (Crataegus). Copenhagen: Lehmanns & Stages Forlag. 1897.
