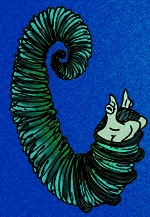
- Annuloceras summersi

Scientific classification
- Kingdom: Animalia
- Phylum: Mollusca
- Class: Cephalopoda
- Subclass: †Ammonoidea
- Order: †Ammonitida
- Suborder: †Ancyloceratina
- Family: †Aegocrioceratidae
- Genus: †Annuloceras; Murphy et al, 1995

Species
- Annuloceras summersi

= Annuloceras =

Annuloceras Temporal range: Barremian

Genus of molluscs (fossil)

Annuloceras ("ringed horns") is an extinct genus of ammonite cephalopod. Its fossils are found in Lower Barremian sediments from California. The genus is currently placed in the family Aegocrioceratidae.

Annuloceras is a heteromorph ammonite similar in form to other heteroceratids except that the early helix is more loosely wound. Macroscaphites differs in that the early portion is planispiral and tightly wound. Contemporary Shastoceras, found the same strata in California, differs in lacking a coiled juvenile section.
