= Flora Danica =

Atlas of botany native to Denmark

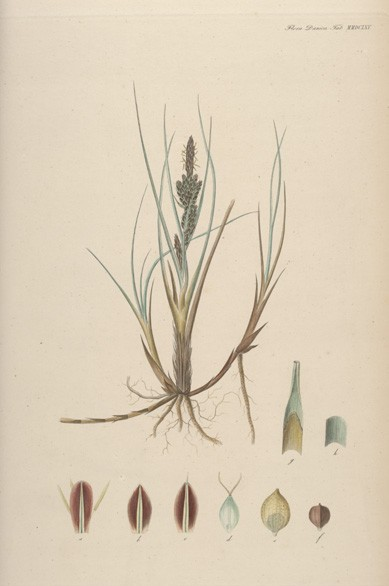
Carex trinervis Degl. Plate 2665 from Flora Danica, part 45 (1861)

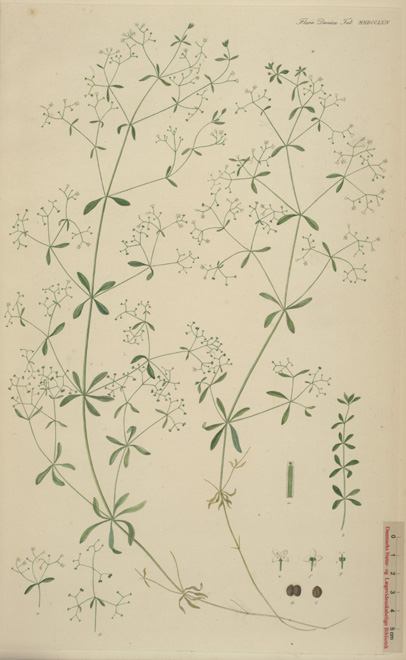
Galium palustre L. Plate 2764 from Flora Danica, part 47 (1869)

Flora Danica is a comprehensive atlas of botany from the Age of Enlightenment, containing folio-sized pictures of all the wild plants native to Denmark, in the period from 1761 to 1883.

== History ==
Flora Danica was proposed by G. C. Oeder, then professor of botany at the Botanic Garden in Copenhagen, in 1753 and was completed 123 years later, in 1883. The complete work comprises 51 parts and 3 supplements, containing 3,240 copper engraved plates. The original plan was to cover all plants, including bryophytes, lichens and fungi native to crown lands of the Danish king, that is Denmark, Schleswig-Holstein, Oldenburg-Delmenhorst and Norway with its North Atlantic dependencies Iceland, the Faroe Islands and Greenland. However, changes were made due to territorial cessations during the period of publication. After 1814, when the double monarchy of Denmark–Norway was abolished, very few Norwegian plants were included, and similar changes were seen after 1864, when the duchies of Schleswig and Holstein were ceded. However, in the mid-19th-century era of Scandinavism, the Nordiske Naturforskermøde in Copenhagen proposed to make Flora Danica a Scandinavian work. Thus, three supplementary volumes were issued, containing the remaining Norwegian plants and the more important plants only occurring in Sweden.

Oeder travelled extensively in the regions covered by the proposed Flora. The illustrations were produced by Michael Rössler (1705–1777), a skilled engraver from Nuremberg, and his son, Martin Rössler (1727–1782), who drew the plants on field trips with Oeder.

The first ten issues appeared with a total of 600 plates. To produce the illustrations, both Rösslers moved to Copenhagen in 1755 and remained there until the end of their lives, with Michael becoming a copper engraver. Their illustrations are considered the best in Flora Danica, and set a benchmark in botanical illustration. Later illustrators were Johann Christian Thornam (1822–1908), Christian F. Mueller (1748–1814), the brother of the botanist editor Otto Friedrich Müller, for volumes 12 to 21, and Johann Theodor Bayer (1782–1873), for volumes 22–46, accounting for some 1500 plates.

=== Publishers/editors through time ===
	Years	Fascicles	Plates
Georg Christian Oeder	1761–1771	1–10	1–600
O.F. Müller	1775–1782	11–15	601–900
Martin Vahl	1787–1799	16–21	901–1260
J.W. Hornemann	1806–1840	22–39	1261–2340
S. Drejer, J. F. Schouw and Jens Vahl	1843	40	2341–2400
F. Liebmann	1845–1853	41–43 & Suppl. 1	2401–2580 & S1-60
Japetus Steenstrup and Johan Lange	1858	44	2581–2640
Johan Lange	1861–1883	45–51 & Suppl. 2–3	2641–3060 & S61-180

== Dinner set ==
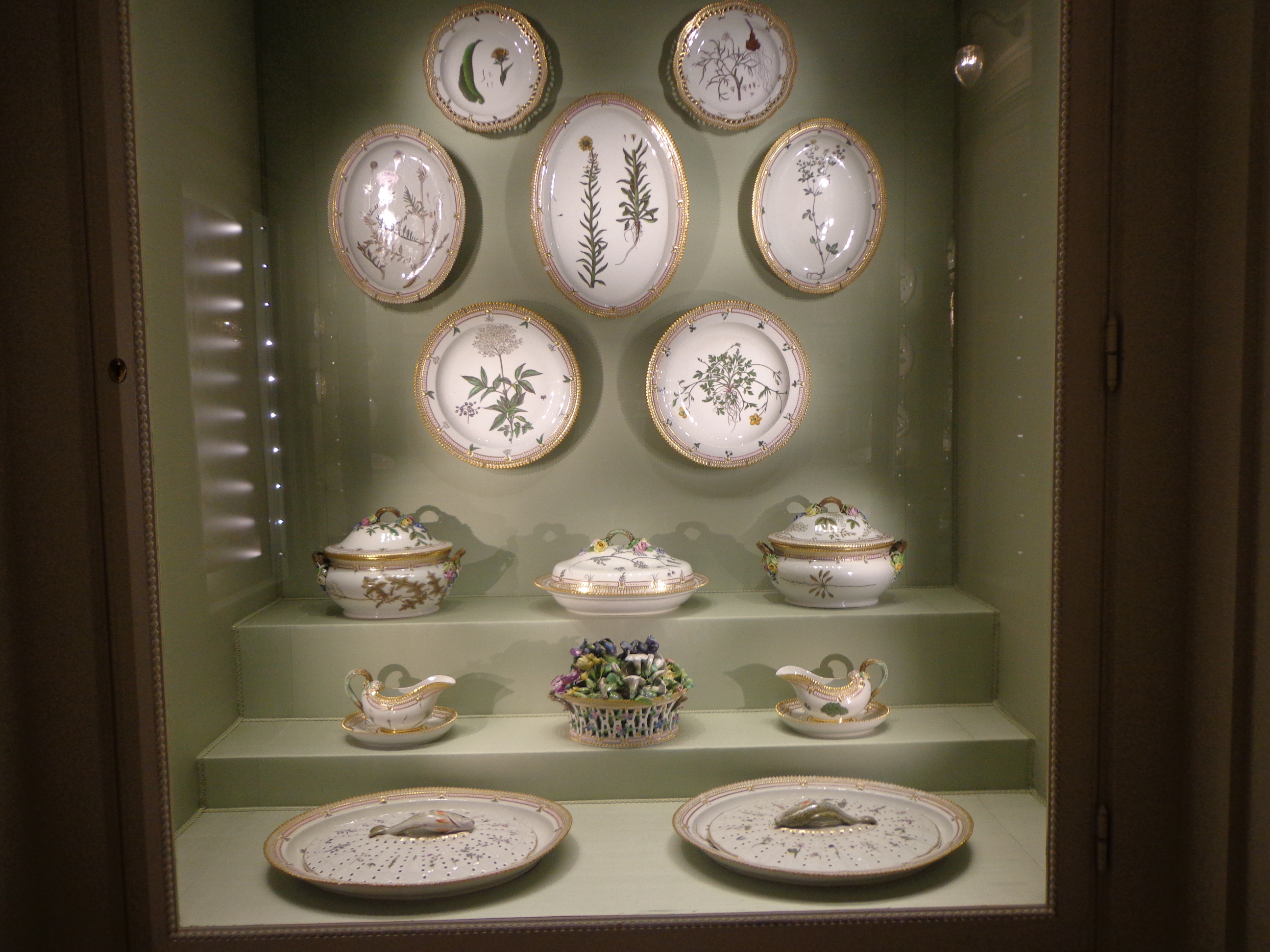
Part of the original Flora Danica dinner set on display in the Flora Danica Cabinet at Christiansborg Palace in Copenhagen.

In 1790 the Danish Crown Prince Frederik ordered a dinner set made decorated with exact copies of the plates of Flora Danica. The dinner set was meant as a gift for Russian Empress Catherine II. Catherine, however, never received it, as she died in 1796. It is currently on display at Christiansborg Palace, Amalienborg Palace and Rosenborg Castle.

The dinner set is still in use for special occasions in the Danish royal family (latest occasions 1980 & 2022). Copies of the set are sold by the Royal Copenhagen Porcelain Manufactory.
