= University of Copenhagen Botanical Garden =

Botanical garden in the centre of Copenhagen, Denmark

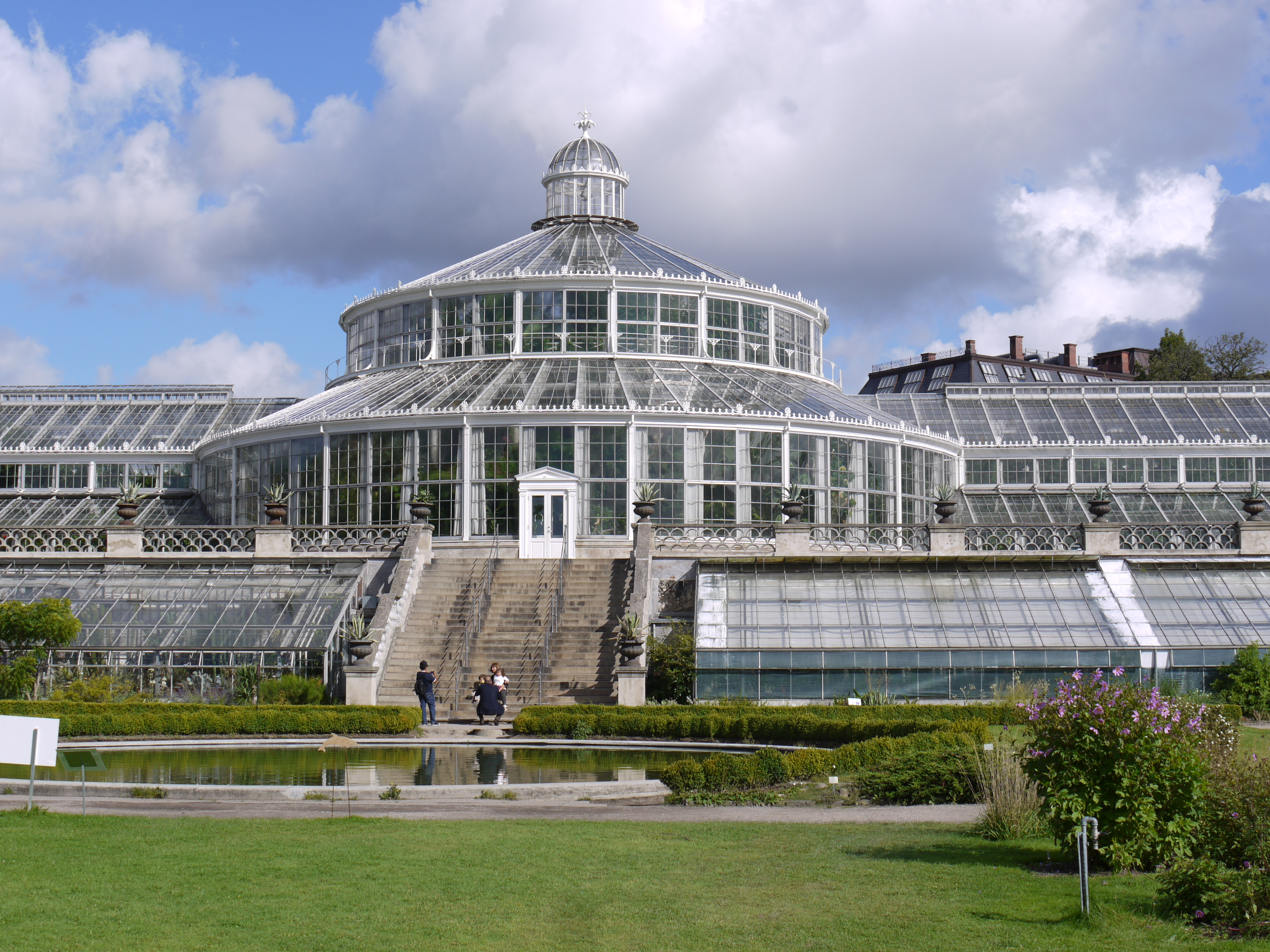
- The Palm House from 1874
- Interactive map of University of Copenhagen Botanical Garden
- Type: Botanic Garden
- Location: Copenhagen, Denmark
- Coordinates: 55°41′13″N 12°34′26″E
- Area: 10 hectares
- Created: 1600 (founded); 1870 (current location)
- Operator: University of Copenhagen
- Status: Open all year
- Species: 13,000+
- Website: snm.dk/en/botanical-garden

The University of Copenhagen Botanical Garden (Danish: Botanisk have), usually referred to simply as Copenhagen Botanical Garden, is a botanical garden located in the centre of Copenhagen, Denmark. It covers an area of 10 hectares and is particularly noted for its extensive complex of historical glasshouses dating from 1874.

The garden is part of the Natural History Museum of Denmark, which is itself part of the University of Copenhagen Faculty of Science. It serves both research, educational and recreational purposes.

The identification code of the University of Copenhagen Botanical Garden as a member of the Botanic Gardens Conservation International (BGCI), as well as the initials of its herbarium is C.

== History ==
=== The first garden: Hortus Medicus ===
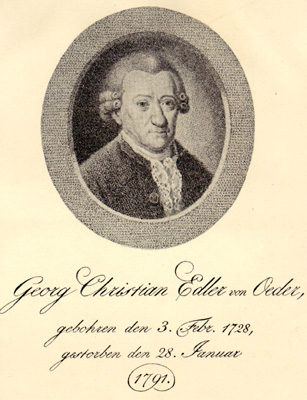
Georg Christian Oeder

The botanical garden was first established in 1600 but it was moved twice before it was ultimately given its current location in 1870. It was probably founded to secure a collection of Danish medicinal plants after the Reformation had seen many convents and their gardens abandoned or demolished.

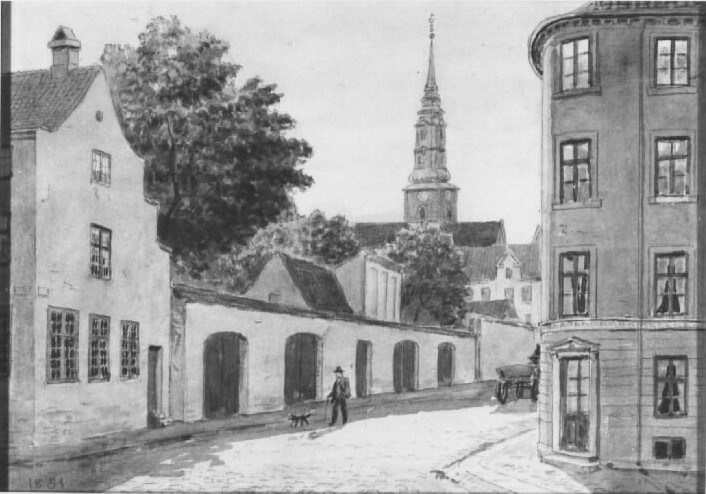
The remains of the first botanical garden. "Hortus Medicus", 1600–1770, at the corner of Fiolstræde and Krystalgade

The first garden, known as Hortus Medicus, was created on 2 August 1600 by royal charter on a piece of land donated by the king, Christian IV. It was located in Skidenstræde (now Krystalgade) and a residence for one of the professors of the university was also built at the site. It rested upon the professor in residence to maintain the garden, irrespective of which chair he held. In 1621 Ole Worm personally took over the responsibility for the garden and he enriched it with a great number of Danish medicinal plants as well as rare foreign species he received from his many professional contacts abroad.

=== Oeder's Garden ===
A second botanical garden was laid out by Georg Christian Oeder in 1752 in the newly founded Frederiksstaden district at the request of Frederik V at a site bisected by Amaliegade just north of Frederik's Hospital. The smaller western section, covering just under half a hectare, was equipped with a greenhouse while the eastern section remained largely unplanted. The garden was opened to the public in 1763.

In 1770 part of Oeder's Garden was put at the disposal of the University's botanical garden. The preceding year Christian VII had donated 2,500 thaler to the University, the interest from which would be used for the Botanical Garden. This had created the economical foundation for an enlargement but since there was no space for it at its original address, the off-site solution was ultimately opted for.

Oeder became the Botanical Garden's first director. In order to emphasise its economic significance, as well as in the spirit of the Age of Enlightenment, he began a work in progress which was to become Flora Danica, an illustrated work describing all Danish and Norwegian plants. Oeder was fired in 1771 in connection with the Johann Friedrich Struensee affair.

=== The Charlottenborg Garden ===
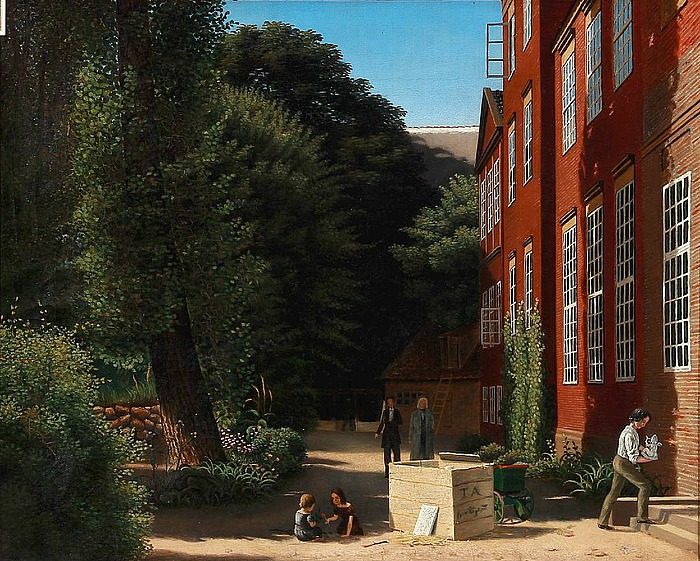
Krystalgade with Trinity Church on Købmagergade visible in the background

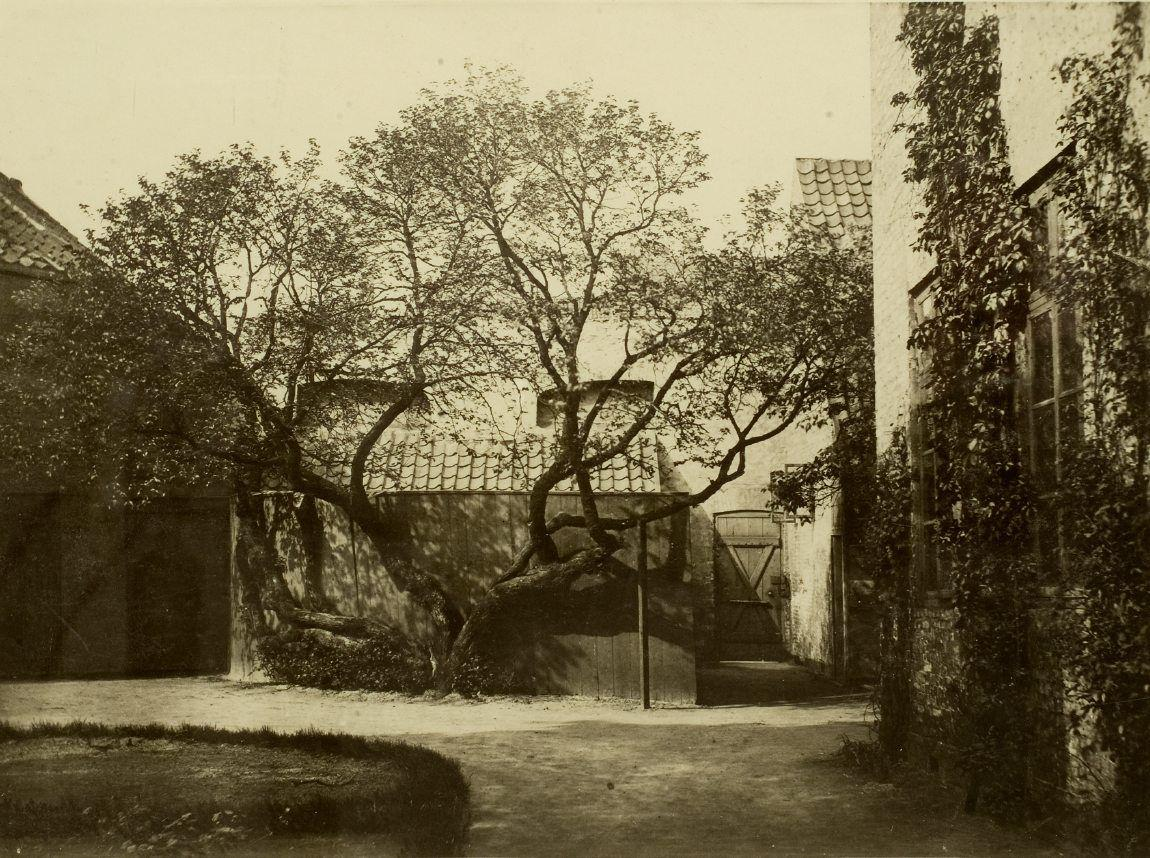
The garden between 1860 and 1874

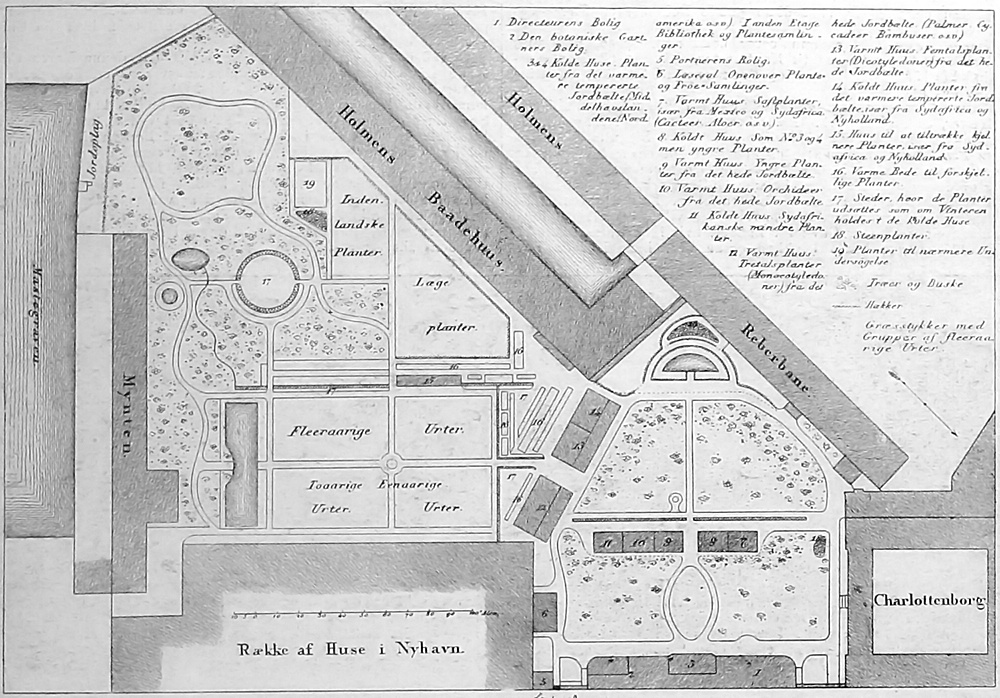
Plan of the former garden behind Charlottenborg Palace (1847)

In 1778 both gardens were closed when the king reacquired the land at Amaliegade and at the same time donated a tract of land behind Charlottenborg Palace for the establishment of a new and larger botanical garden. Plans for this garden received royal approval on 22 July 1778. It was to have two directors, one appointed by the University and the other by the King. The first University appointment to this post was Christian Friis Rottbøll, who had already managed the garden since Oeder's retirement, and the first royal appointment was Johan Theodor Holmskjold. At the same event, an associate professor was employed at the garden. The first to hold this chair was Martin Vahl, who played a large part in moving the plants from Oeder's Garden to Charlottenborg Garden.

In 1817, the model with a double directorship was abandoned when Jens Wilken Hornemann was made the sole director of the garden. At this stage the garden encompassed approximately 1.6 hectares in a low, waterlogged area that was bounded by Charlottenborg, Nyhavn, the Mint and Bremerholm. A main building was erected along the Nyhavn canal, housing both a botanical museum, a library and residences for the director and a botanical gardener. There were also facilities for the storage of sensitive plants during winter. The garden's first greenhouse, Guiones Koldhus (Guione's Coolhouse), was erected in 1784. In 1803 the king funded of a new 200-square metre complex of greenhouses and nore were added in 1837.

In 1841 Joakim Frederik Schouw replaced Hornemann as director and the garden. Among his initiatives was the establishment of a new section dedicated to Danish species, holding 570 species, and improved cataloguing of plants and seeds. His tenure lasted until 1852. During this phase the garden became still more cramped and it became evident that another expansion was needed.

=== The current garden ===
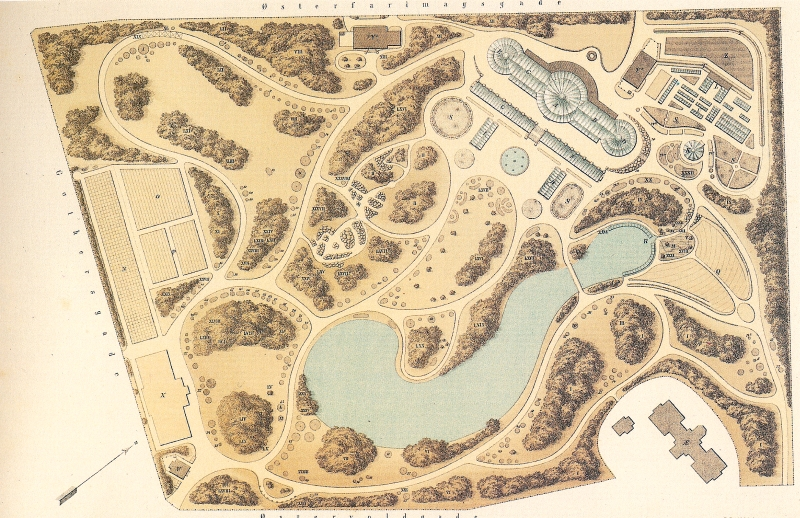
Plan of the new Botanical Garden

The botanical gardens got its current location in 1870. Four years later in 1874 the gardens got its large complex of glasshouses at the initiative of Carlsberg founder J. C. Jacobsen who also funded it. His inspiration was that of the glass building the Crystal Palace that was erected for the Great Exhibition in London in 1851.

In 1977 the gardens, including the greenhouses, became listed by Danish Agency for Culture and Palaces, the Danish conservancy authorities.

== Copenhagen Botanical Garden today ==
Copenhagen Botanical Garden is an informal garden with free admission. There are conservatories, a museum and herbarium, a library (admission by appointment only) a shop plants, seeds and a small selection of garden equipment and eating place.

== Collections ==
The botanical gardens contain more than 13,000 species. The garden is arranged in different sections including: Danish plants (600 species), perennial plants (1,100 species), annual plants (1,100 species), rock gardens with plants from mountainous areas in Central and Southern Europe and Conifer Hill which is planted with coniferous trees. One of the newest inclusions is a rhododendron garden

The garden has many handsome specimen trees. The oldest tree in the gardens is a taxodium from 1806 that was moved along from the old location at an age of 60 years.

== Glasshouses ==
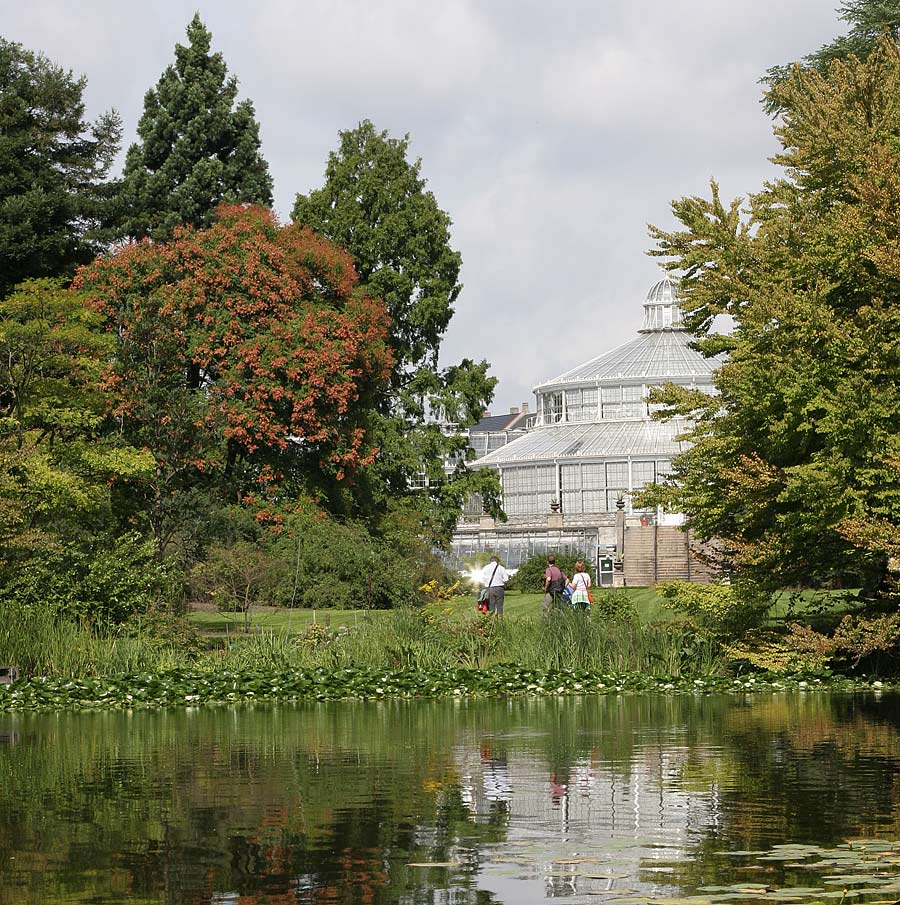
A view of the Palm House across the lake

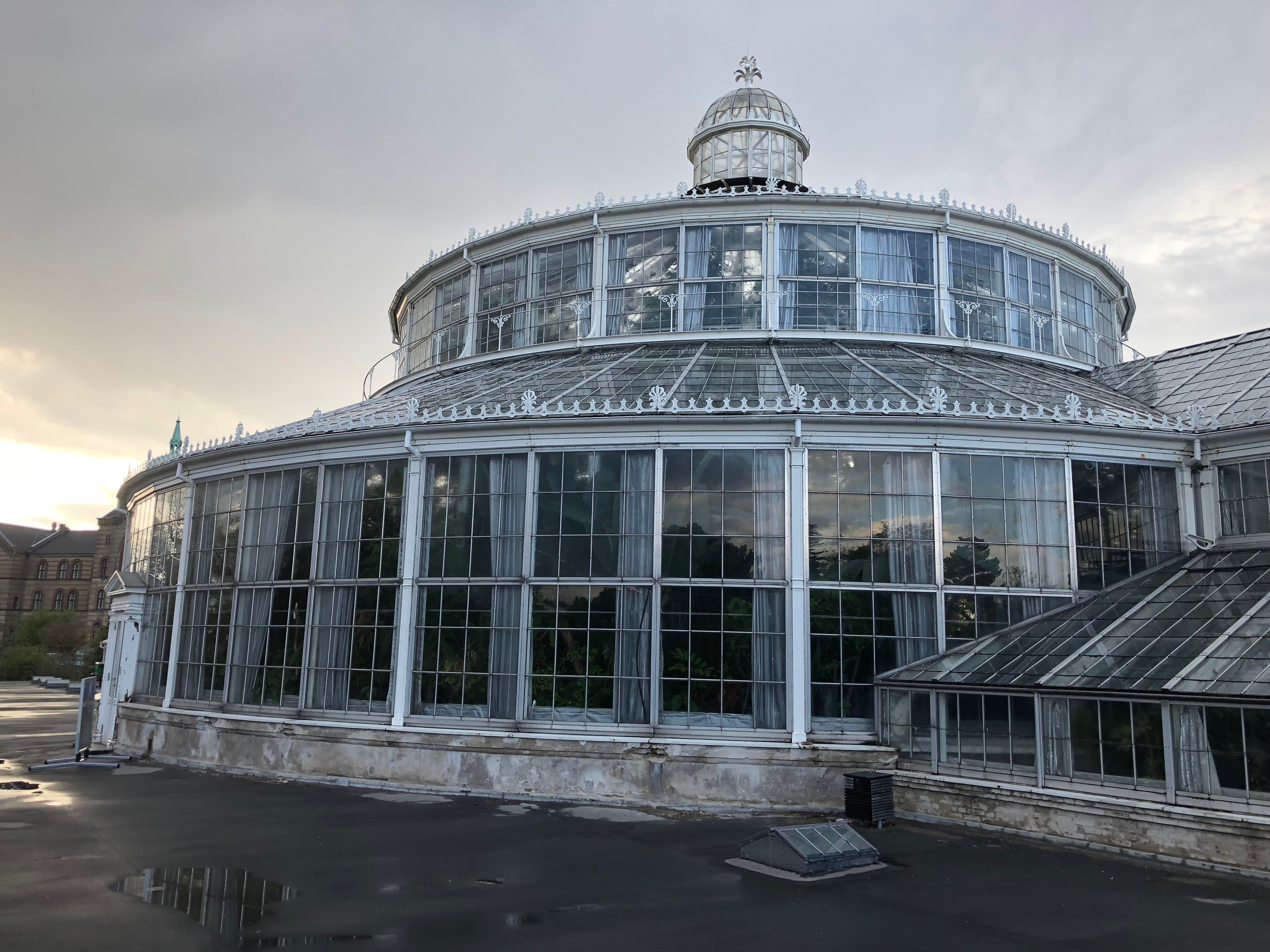
Another view of the Palm House

The Gardens have 27 glasshouses. The most notable is the 3000-square metre conservatory complex from 1874. The Palm House at its centre is 16 metres tall and has narrow, cast-iron spiral stairs leading to a passageway at the top. Plants include a palm from 1824 and a fine collection of cycads, some of which are more than 100 years old. A fifty metres long glasshouse house an extensive collection of cacti and other succulents whilst another one houses orchids and begonias. A modern glasshouse is dedicated to caudiciforms. The garden also has a special air-conditioned greenhouse that can re-create environments suitable for Arctic plants.

=== The Palm House ===
Here is the list of some plant species growing at the Palm House:

- Erythroxylum novogranatense
- Impatiens walleriana
- Camellia sinensis
- Sphaeralcea rusbyi
- Alyxia buxifolia
- Lobelia laxiflora
- Luma apiculata
- Solanum viarum
- Syzygium aromaticum
- Senna occidentalis
- Catharanthus roseus
- Flacourtia indica
- Asplenium nidus
- Begonia masoniana
- Ixora coccinea
- Castanospermum australe
- Zamia muricata
- Campanula poscharskyana
- Morus nigra
- Campylandra yunnanensis
- Asparagus krebsianus
- Clavija repanda
- Gymnosporia pyria
- Aglaonema nitidum
- Ficus palmeri
- Ficus rumphii
- Pithecellobium unguis-cati
- Chirita tamiana
- Euphorbia spectabilis
- Platycerium willinckii
- Bois d'ortie
- Hoffmannia
- Strophanthus
- Stenochlaena tenuifolia
- Streptocarpus brevipilosus
- Streptocarpus ionanthus subsp. velutinus (formerly Saintpaulia velutina)
- Coccoloba tiliacea
- Uncarina grandidieri

== Museum and seed bank ==
The university's botanical museum and herbarium are housed in a building situated within the garden, giving the garden staff ready access to reference works and more than 2 million dried plant specimens.

== Surrounding buildings ==
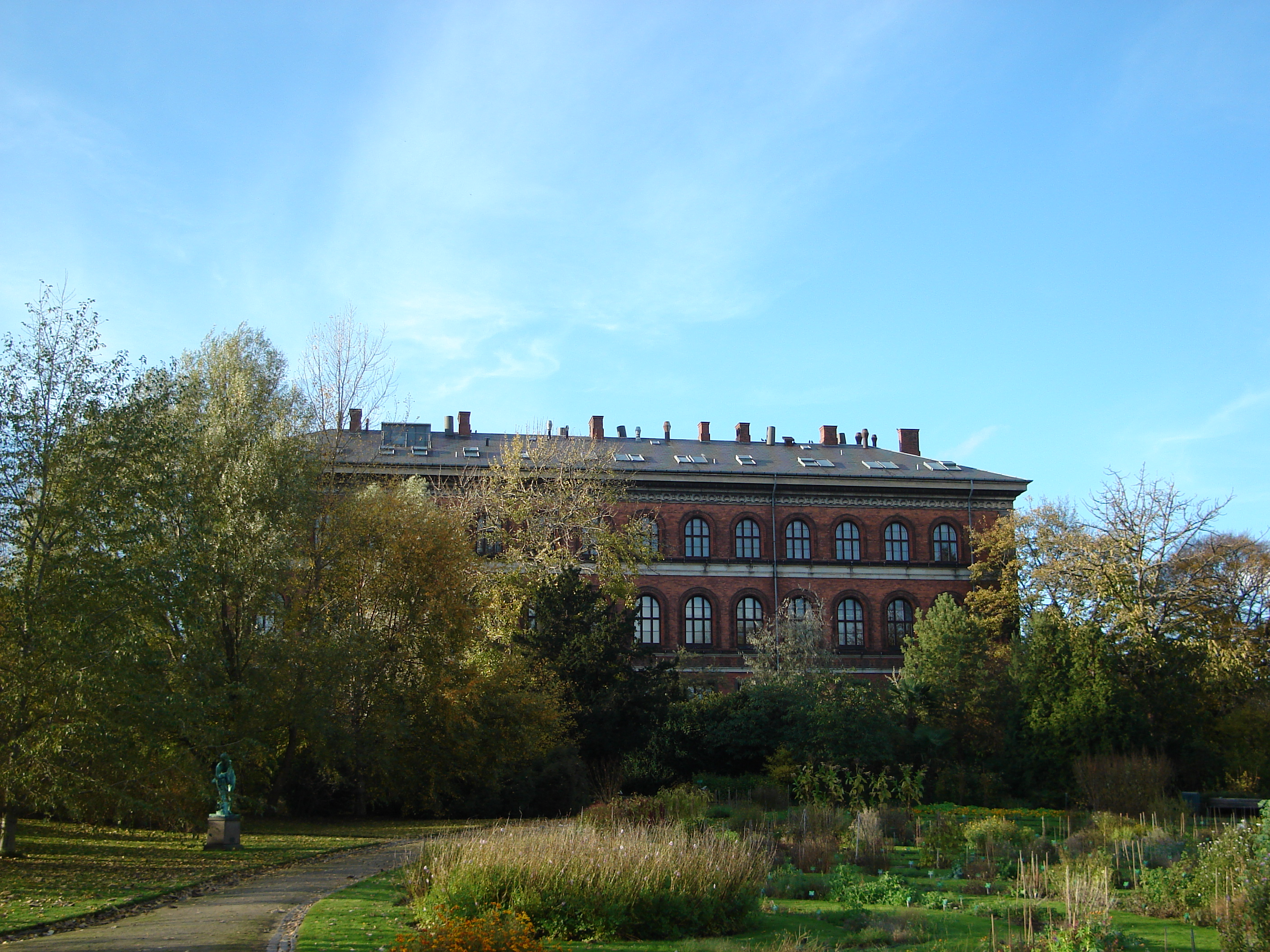
The Faculty of Social Sciences Library seen from the garden

=== Social Sciences Faculty Library ===
Located at 140 Gothersgade, the building was designed by Johan Daniel Herholdt and built from 1888 to 1890 as botanical Laboratory. It is a Historicist building inspired by Italian palazzi, a style which Herholt had previously relied on in his now demolished National Bank at Holmens Kanal. The building has housed the faculty library of the Faculty of Social Sciences since 2011.

=== Institute of Psychology ===
Institute of Psychology, at 2A Øster Farimagsgade, is based in a building which was built in 1957 to the design of Kai Gottlob for the Institute of Biology at University of Copenhagen.

== Public art, monuments and memorials ==
In 1909 to 1911, Carl Jacobsen installed a number of casts of classical statues in the garden.

== See also ==
- Parks and open spaces in Copenhagen
