= Jens Wilken Hornemann =

Danish botanist (1770–1841)

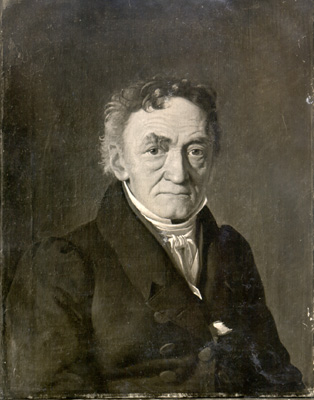
- Painting by Constantin Hansen, 1830
- Born: March 6, 1770; Ærø, Denmark
- Died: July 30, 1841 (aged 71)

Jens Wilken Hornemann (6 March 1770 – 30 July 1841) was a Danish botanist. He was a professor of botany at the University of Copenhagen from 1808 and director of the Botanic Garden from 1817. Hornemann was also a publisher of the Flora Danica.

== Early life and education ==
Hornemann was born on 6 March 1770 at Flackke on Ærø, the son of the local priest Jacob Utzon Clausen Hornemann (1719–1787) and Margrethe Dorothea Christiansdatter Sadolin (1738–1812). His brother Christian Hornemann was a professor of Western philosophy.

Hornemann was tutored at home until 1783, when he became a student of his brother-in-law, Morten Bredsdorff. Bredsdorf was a pastor in Vester Skerninge and scholar of natural history. In 1786, he moved to Copenhagen where matriculated at the University of Copenhagen in 1788. There, he became part of the newly-established natural history society in 1789. The society's teacher, Martin Vahl, became a mentor and friend of Hornemann's.

== Biography ==
He was a lecturer at the University of Copenhagen Botanical Garden from 1801. After the death of Martin Vahl in 1804, the task of publishing the Flora Danica was given to Hornemann, who subsequently issued fasc. 22–39 (1801–1840) with a total of 1080 plates. Hornemann was professor of botany at the University of Copenhagen from 1808 and director of the Botanic Garden (from 1817). In 1815, he was elected a corresponding member of the Royal Swedish Academy of Sciences, and in 1816, his status was changed to that of foreign member.

== Personal life ==
Hornemann married his cousin Marie Judithe Hornemann (1779–1830) on 9 October 1801 in Copenhagen. They were the parents of two sons and five daughters. Their son, Emil Hornemann, was a medical doctor who played a key role during the 1853 Copenhagen cholera outbreak and the establishment of Workers' Building Association.

Hans Christian Andersen was a frequent visitor in Hornemann's home in Copenhagen. Andersen used him as model for "the Professor of Botany", who understands the gestures of the flowers, in the tale "Little Ida's Flowers".

== Honours ==
Several plant genera have been named in his honour, however for reasons of taxonomy and nomenclature all names are today synonyms. Hornemannia Willd. (1809), once placed in Scrophulariaceae, contained on two species, both of which are now referred to other genera (one to the genus Mazus Lour. (1790) and the other to Lindernia All. (1766)). This fact prohibits the use of the names Hornemannia Vahl (1810) for the Caribbean genus of Ericaceae (now to be called Symphysia C.B. Presl (1827)) and Hornemannia Benth. (1846) for the East Asiatic genus of Scrophulariaceae (now to be called Ellisiophyllum Maxim. (1871)).

He is also commemorated in the specific epithets for the bird Carduelis hornemanni (Arctic Redpoll), the flowering plant Epilobium hornemannii Rchb. (Hornemann's willowherb) and the agaric fungus Stropharia hornemannii (Fr.) S. Lundell & Nannf. (1934).

Academic offices
| Preceded by Johan Sylvester Saxtorph | Rector of University of Copenhagen; 1830–1831 | Succeeded by Adam Oehlenschläger |
