= Evandromyia chacuensis =

Scientific classification
- Kingdom: Animalia
- Phylum: Arthropoda
- Class: Insecta
- Order: Diptera
- Family: Psychodidae
- Genus: Evandromyia
- Subgenus: Barettomyia
- Species: E. chacuensis

Binomial name
- Evandromyia chacuensis Szelag, Rosa, Galati, Andrade Filho & Salomón, 2018

Species of fly

Evandromyia chacuensis is a species of sand fly first circumscribed in 2018 from specimens collected in Argentina. It is the 12th species currently described in the subgenus Barrettomyia.

== Morphology ==
The males and females are both about 2-3mm in length, medium in size when compared to other phlebotomines, and light brown in general color.

== Distribution ==
The type specimens were collected in three municipalities of Argentina's Chaco province: Misión Nueva Pompeya in the Dry Chaco ecoregion in the north of the province, and Colonia Benítez and Resistencia in the Humid Chaco ecoregion in the south of the province.

== Medical importance ==
Sand flies of the genus Evandromyia are among the most numerous and widely distributed sand flies in Argentina, so this new species may be found to play a role in the numerous leishmaniasis outbreaks that have occurred over the past 20 years in the Chaco bioregion, where an increasing number of cases are associated with periurban transmission. Some species of phlebotomine sand flies are able to transmit the causative agents of Bartonelloses and phleboviral diseases to susceptible mammalian hosts.

== Etymology ==
The new species name chacuensis was derived from the Quechua word "chacú", connoting a name of a hunting territory or a hunting technique, from which the Hispanic place name Chaco was derived, and the Latin adjectival suffix "-ensis," meaning “originating in.”
