= Evandromyia =

Scientific classification
- Kingdom: Animalia
- Phylum: Arthropoda
- Class: Insecta
- Order: Diptera
- Family: Psychodidae
- Subfamily: Phlebotominae
- Genus: Evandromyia; Mangabeira, 1941

Subgenera
- See text

Genus of fly

Evandromyia is a genus of sand fly first circumscribed in 1941. It is subdivided into three subgenera, which are further subdivided into series.

== Subdivisions ==
The following subdivisions are accepted as of 2017, unless otherwise cited.

- Subgenus (Aldamyia) Galati, 1995
  - Evandromyia aldafalcaoae (Santos, Andrade-Filho & Honer, 2001)
  - Evandromyia andersoni (Le Pont & Desjeux, 1988)
  - Evandromyia apurinan Shimabukuro, Figueira & Silva, 2013
  - Evandromyia bacula (Martins, Falcão & Silva, 1965)
  - Evandromyia carmelinoi (Ryan, Fraiha, Lainson & Shaw, 1986)
  - Evandromyia dubitans (Sherlock, 1962)
  - Evandromyia evandroi (Costa Lima & Antunes, 1936)
  - Evandromyia hashiguchii León, Teran, Neira & Le Pont, 2009
  - Evandromyia lenti (Mangabeira, 1938)
  - Evandromyia orcyi Oliveira, Sanguinette, Almeida & Andrade-Filho, 2015
  - Evandromyia sericea (Floch & Abonnenc, 1944)
  - Evandromyia termitophila (Martins, Falcão & Silva, 1964)
  - Evandromyia walkeri (Newstead, 1914)
  - Evandromyia williamsi (Damasceno, Causey & Arouck, 1945)
- Subgenus (Barrettomyia) Martins and Silva, 1968
  - Series cortelezzii Galati, 1995
    - Evandromyia chacuensis Szelag, Rosa, Galati, Andrade Filho & Salomón, 2018
    - Evandromyia cortelezzii (Brèthes, 1923)
    - Evandromyia corumbaensis (Galati, Nunes, Oshiro & Rego, 1989)
    - Evandromyia sallesi (Galvão & Coutinho, 1939)
    - Evandromyia spelunca Carvalho, Brazil, Sanguinette & Andrade-Filho, 2011
  - Series monstruosa Lewis, Young & Minter, 1977
    - Evandromyia monstruosa (Floch & Abonnenc, 1944)
    - Evandromyia teratodes (Martins, Falcão & Silva, 1964)
  - Series tupynambai Martins & Silva, 1968
    - Evandromyia bahiensis (Mangabeira & Sherlock, 1961)
    - Evandromyia callipyga (Martins & Silva, 1965)
    - Evandromyia costalimai (Mangabeira, 1942)
    - Evandromyia petropolitana (Martins & Silva, 1968)
    - Evandromyia tupynambai (Mangabeira, 1942)
- Subgenus (Evandromyia) Mangabeira, 1941
  - Series infraspinosa Young & Arias, 1977
    - Evandromyia begonae (Ortiz & Torrez, 1975)
    - Evandromyia bourrouli (Barretto & Coutinho, 1941)
    - Evandromyia brachyphalla (Mangabeira, 1941)
    - Evandromyia georgii (Freitas & Barrett, 2002)
    - Evandromyia infraspinosa (Mangabeira, 1941)
    - Evandromyia inpai (Young & Arias, 1977)
    - Evandromyia ledezmaae León, Teran, Neira & Le Pont, 2009
    - Evandromyia pinottii (Damasceno & Arouck, 1956)
    - Evandromyia sipani (Fernández, Carbajal, Alexander & Need, 1994)
    - Evandromyia tarapacaensis (Le Pont, Torrez-Espejo & Galati, 1997)
  - Series rupicola Young & Fairchild, 1974
    - Evandromyia correalimai (Martins, Coutinho & Luz, 1970)
    - Evandromyia gaucha Andrade-Filho, Souza & Falcão, 2007
    - Evandromyia grimaldii Andrade-Filho, Pinto, Santos & Carvalho, 2009
    - Evandromyia rupicola (Martins, Godoy & Silva, 1962)
    - Evandromyia tylophalla Andrade & Galati, 2012
  - Series saulensis Lewis, Young & Minter, 1977
    - Evandromyia saulensis (Floch & Abonnenc, 1944)
    - Evandromyia wilsoni (Damasceno & Causey, 1945)
- Evandromyia incertae sedis
  - Evandromyia edwardsi (Mangabeira, 1941)
