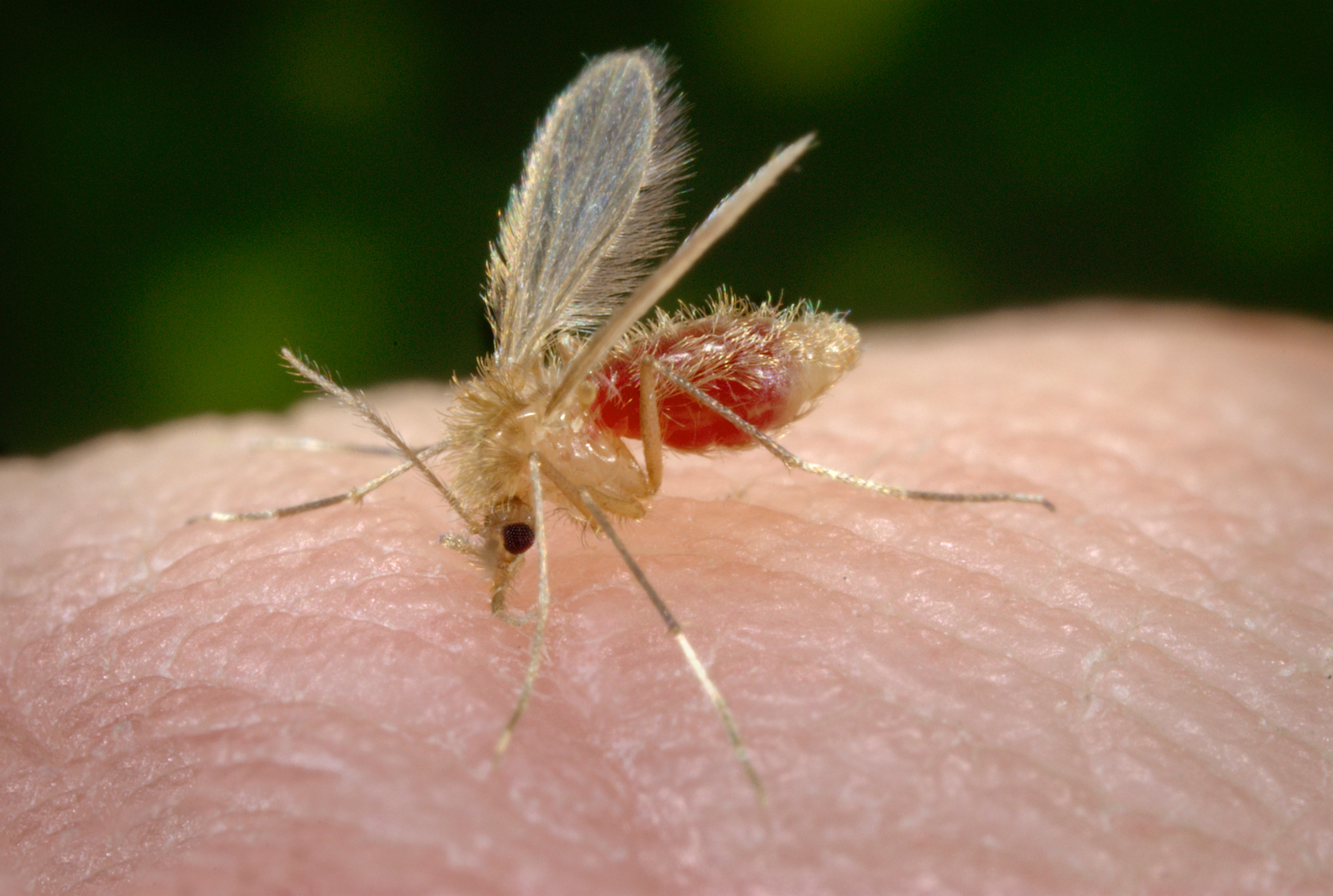
- Phlebotomus papatasi feeding on human blood

Scientific classification
- Kingdom: Animalia
- Phylum: Arthropoda
- Clade: Pancrustacea
- Class: Insecta
- Order: Diptera
- Family: Psychodidae
- Genus: Phlebotomus
- Species: P. papatasi

Binomial name
- Phlebotomus papatasi (Scopoli, 1786)

= Phlebotomus papatasi =

Species of fly

Phlebotomus papatasi is a species of insects commonly known as sandflies. Due to their ectothermic climate limitations, P. papatasi are confined to regions with temperatures above 15 degrees Celsius for at least three months of the year, spanning over much of the European Mediterranean, North Africa, the Middle East, and Central Asia. Around one thousand sandfly species have been described, belonging to the subfamily Phlebotominae within the family Psychodidae. The Psychodidae family belongs to the order Diptera within the class Insecta of the subphylum Hexapoda of the Arthropod phylum.

Phlebotomus papatasi are translucent light brown in color, with two large, black compound eyes, six long legs, a transparent abdomen and antennae each comprising a scape, pedicel and flagellum, totaling the sandfly's size to less than four millimeters in length. Small hairs cover the entire body and wings, which are constantly held at a forty-degree angle. Due to P. papatasi belonging to the Diptera order, they are considered true flies in which the primary flight wings are membraned and the second set of smaller wings are used for balance. The second set of wings are commonly referred to as halteres and they oscillate during flight to maintain the organism's orientation in space. While they can fly, P. papatasi typically stay within a few hundred feet of breeding sites and travel with a mix of flight and hopping motions.

Female adult P. papatasi are blood feeders on many vertebrate hosts and act as vectors for multiple infectious diseases, such as Old World cutaneous leishmaniasis and Pappataci fever, both of which will be further explored later in this article.

== Habitat ==
The exact habitat of P. papatasi at any life stage is unknown; however, many samples are found in protected, dark corners of human and animal dwellings, or in ground level leaf litter amongst nearby vegetation. During the early stages of the sandfly's life cycle, they require slightly different habitats, mostly dependent upon humidity levels. More on this is explained in the life stages section.

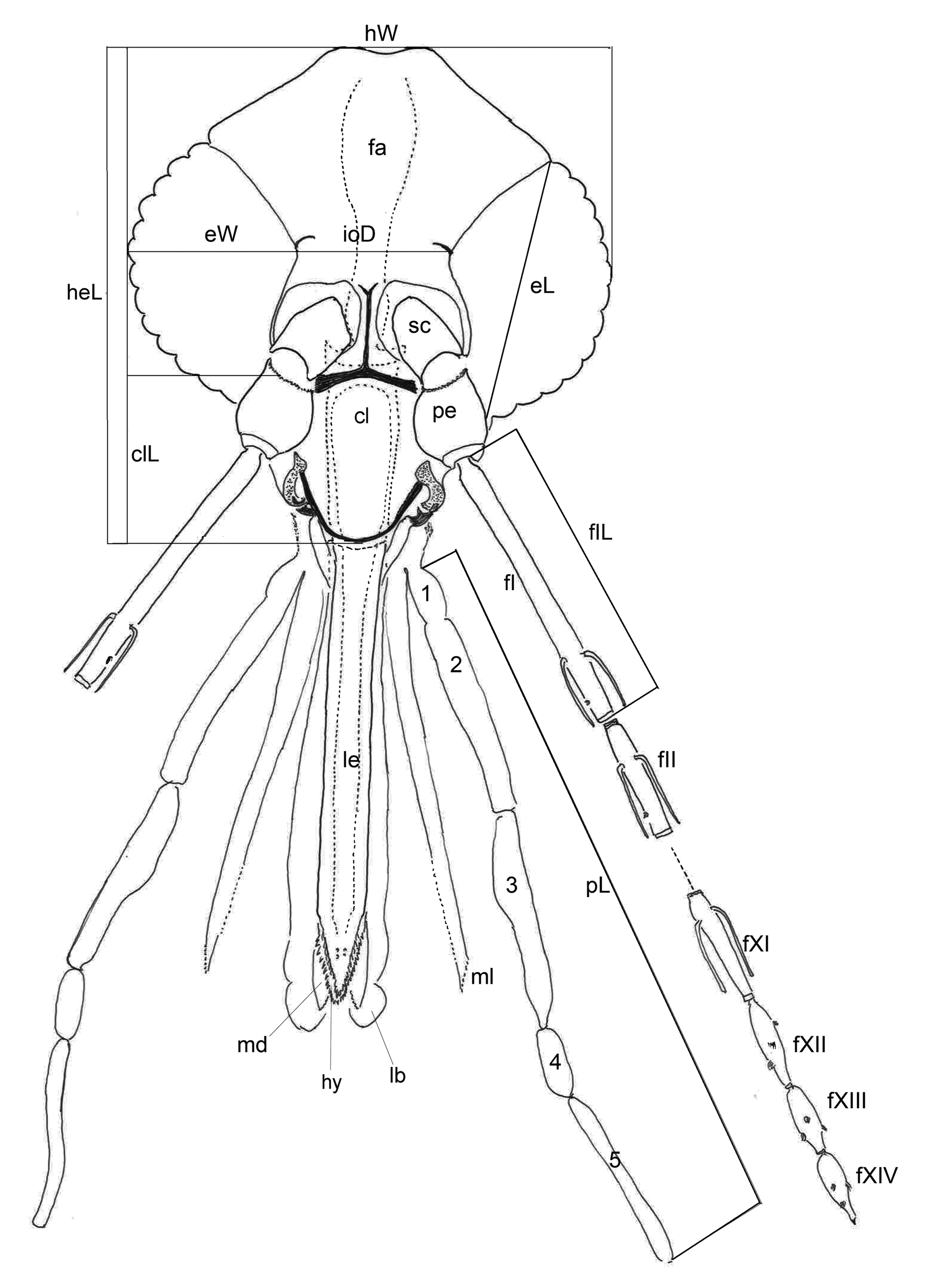
Mouthparts of P. papatasi

== Feeding ==
Phlebotomus papatasi are endophilic, opportunistic feeders that do not travel far from their dwellings to eat, as they are very weak fliers. Feeding occurs just after dusk until sunrise, with the most activity occurring in summer months, particularly in August. Feeding can happen during the daytime if the sandflies are inside darkened rooms or outside near shaded vegetation. While males are herbivorous or non-feeding, female P. papatasi are blood feeders which favor animals such as cattle and wild rats, goats, birds, hyraxes, and humans. Female sandflies have scissor-like mouthparts that are used to bite a vertebrate for a blood meal, and oftentimes promote infection dispersal. Unlike mosquitoes, P. papatasi females consume blood using their proboscis to suck up the pool of blood formed from the bite. In exchange for blood, P. papatasi inject their meal with various proteins to increase blood circulation and inhibit platelet aggregation and blood coagulation. This allows the blood to flow faster and not create blood clots and blockages.

== Life stages ==
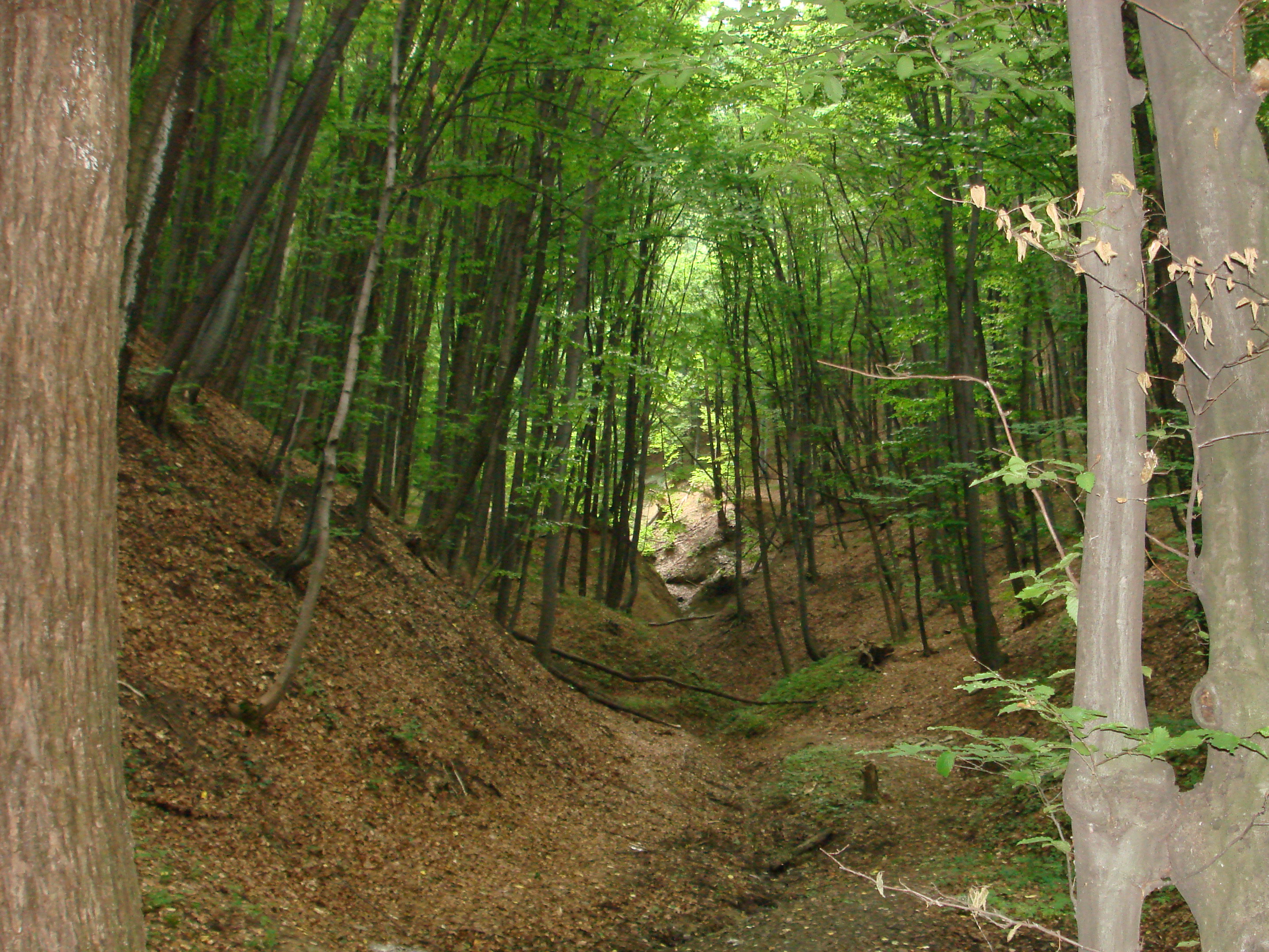
Example of possible habitat appearance of Phlebotomus papatasi, in Romania

The complete life cycle of the P. papatasi fly is typically around six weeks long, although adult males may live for only one week, while adult females live slightly longer. Within cracks in the ground, animal burrows, or leaf litter, male and female P. papatasi undergo a courtship routine before reproduction. The female begins by touching the male on either the antenna or legs, as well as the abdomen to promote male abdominal bending to the left and right, releasing cuticular hydrocarbon sex pheromones. Along with these chemical signals, the potential mates face one another while rubbing their front legs together. The male intermittently flaps his wings throughout this process, and the courtship is accepted when the female briefly flaps her wings in response. At this acceptance, males bend their abdomen towards their head before leaping to contact the female, facing opposite directions to join abdominal tips, allowing sperm release for egg fertilization. The specific location оf copulation occurs at the female's spermathecae, which has six segments, and is surrounded by secretory cells without pigment. Female P. papatasi may perform this mating process with multiple males per gonotrophic cycle, resulting in offspring with more favorable characteristics for survival, possibly through post-copulatory sexual selection. It is not uncommon for females to undergo up to three gonotrophic cycles before the end of their life cycle.

For every gonotrophic cycle, female P. papatasi lay between 30 and 70 eggs in a protected and dark terrestrial areas with high humidity, such as leaf litter around the base of trees, typically one week after a blood meal. The eggs then incubate for up to twenty days before hatching. The second stage of life occurs in a cooler, moist area with plenty of decomposing organic matter for successful development of four instar larval stages in the span of approximately thirty days. In times of unfavorable conditions, such as over winter, both P. papatasi eggs and instar four larvae can diapause for prolonged periods. The P. papatasi larvae develop into pupae for up to thirteen days before emerging as an adult, typically just before sunrise, with males transforming slightly before females. Once an adult, P. papatasi flies live amongst rock crevices, animal burrows, leaf litter near tree roots, and vegetation near human dwellings, dependent upon the environment's warm temperatures, high humidity, plant nectar, and blood reservoirs.

== Diseases ==
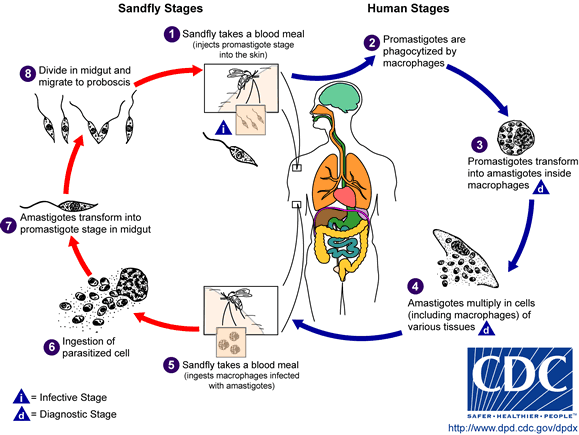
How Phlebotomus papatasi infect humans and vice vera

Phlebotomus papatasi are common vectors of Old World cutaneous leishmaniasis (CL). CL is a health problem in 88 countries, particularly the Middle East, European Mediterranean, North Africa, and Central Asia – all hotspots for P. papatasi habitation. While CL can be caused by a multitude of vectors, P. papatasi is incredibly common and hard to prevent due to lack of knowledge on the species habitat. While anyone can be a target, children are often affected as they are more likely to be exposed outside. The infection process begins when a female sandfly bites a vertebrate host, typically humans, and injects promastigotes using their proboscis. Once inside the host, the infectious promastigotes utilize glucose to phagocytize into amastigotes that will undergo mitosis and infect other host cells. For the host, the first sign of infection is simply redness at the sandfly bite site. Over the next few weeks or months, the site of infection will form a papule or an ulcer that will ultimately burst leaving scarring. There is not one particular treatment method, and many times the disease seems to resolve itself spontaneously.

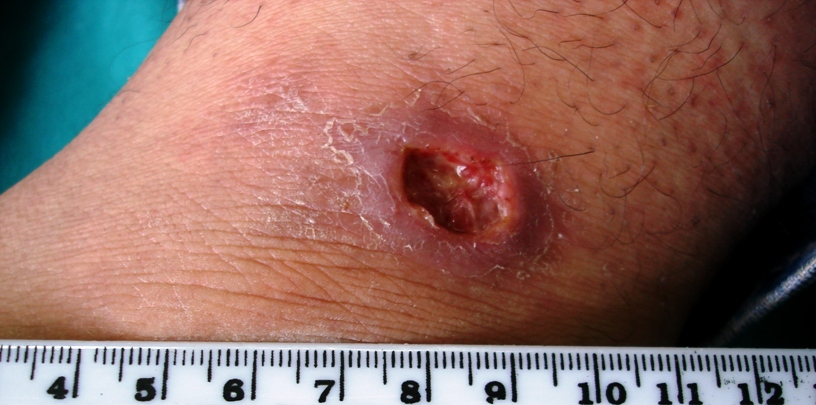
Ulcer caused by Old World cutaneous leishmaniasis

Another common P. papatasi spread health concern is known by many names including sandfly fever, three-day fever and Pappataci fever caused by three serotypes of Phlebovirus. Three-day fever was first characterized in the United States when many US soldiers were infected while stationed in North Africa during World War II. This condition results in symptoms such as muscle weakness, joint pains, head and lower back pains, and sudden onset of a high fever over 102 °F (39 °C) for three to five days, with residual body weakness for up to two weeks. There is no specific treatment for three-day fever, but patients can be treated for symptomatic relief. To become a vector of Pappataci fever, P. papatasi are infected by biting an infected human or animal between 48 hours before onset of symptoms and 24 hours after the fever has ended. Once the virus has entered the sandfly, it requires up to 10 days to incubate before P. papatasi are completely infected. Unlike in vertebrate hosts, the infection remains in the sandfly body for their entire life, and females can pass the virus onto offspring transovarially, leaving the next generation vectors from the beginning.

=== Prevention ===
It is very difficult to prevent the existence of P. papatasi due to much of their habitat location being unknown. Insecticides work to kill them, but determining where to deploy the insecticide in nature is the problem. Typical nets used for other flies such as mosquitoes do not work for P. papatasi protection because the usual 1.2 mm mesh is much too large; however mesh sizes under 0.6 mm may be more successful.
