= Libanophlebotomus =

Libanophlebotomus Temporal range: 130–125.45 Ma Lower Cretaceous

Scientific classification
- Kingdom: Animalia
- Phylum: Arthropoda
- Class: Insecta
- Order: Diptera
- Superfamily: Psychodoidea
- Family: Psychodidae
- Subfamily: Phlebotominae
- Genus: †Libanophlebotomus; Azar, Nel, Solignac, Paicheler & Bouchet, 1999

Type species
- †Libanophlebotomus lutfallahi Azar, Nel, Solignac, Paicheler & Bouchet, 1999

Extinct genus of flies

Libanophlebotomus is a genus of fossil sand fly in the subfamily Phlebotominae.

Fossils are only found in Lebanese amber, collected from Mdeyrij-Hammana, Casa Baabda in Lebanon (Azar collection)

== Species ==
- †Libanophlebotomus lutfallahi Azar, Nel, Solignac, Paicheler & Bouchet, 1999
