= Misión Nueva Pompeya =

Coordinates: 24°55′54″S 61°29′00″W

- Municipality and village
- Interactive map of Misión Nueva Pompeya
- Country: Argentina
- Province: Chaco Province
- Time zone: UTC−3 (ART)

Misión Nueva Pompeya is a village and municipality in Chaco Province in northern Argentina.
