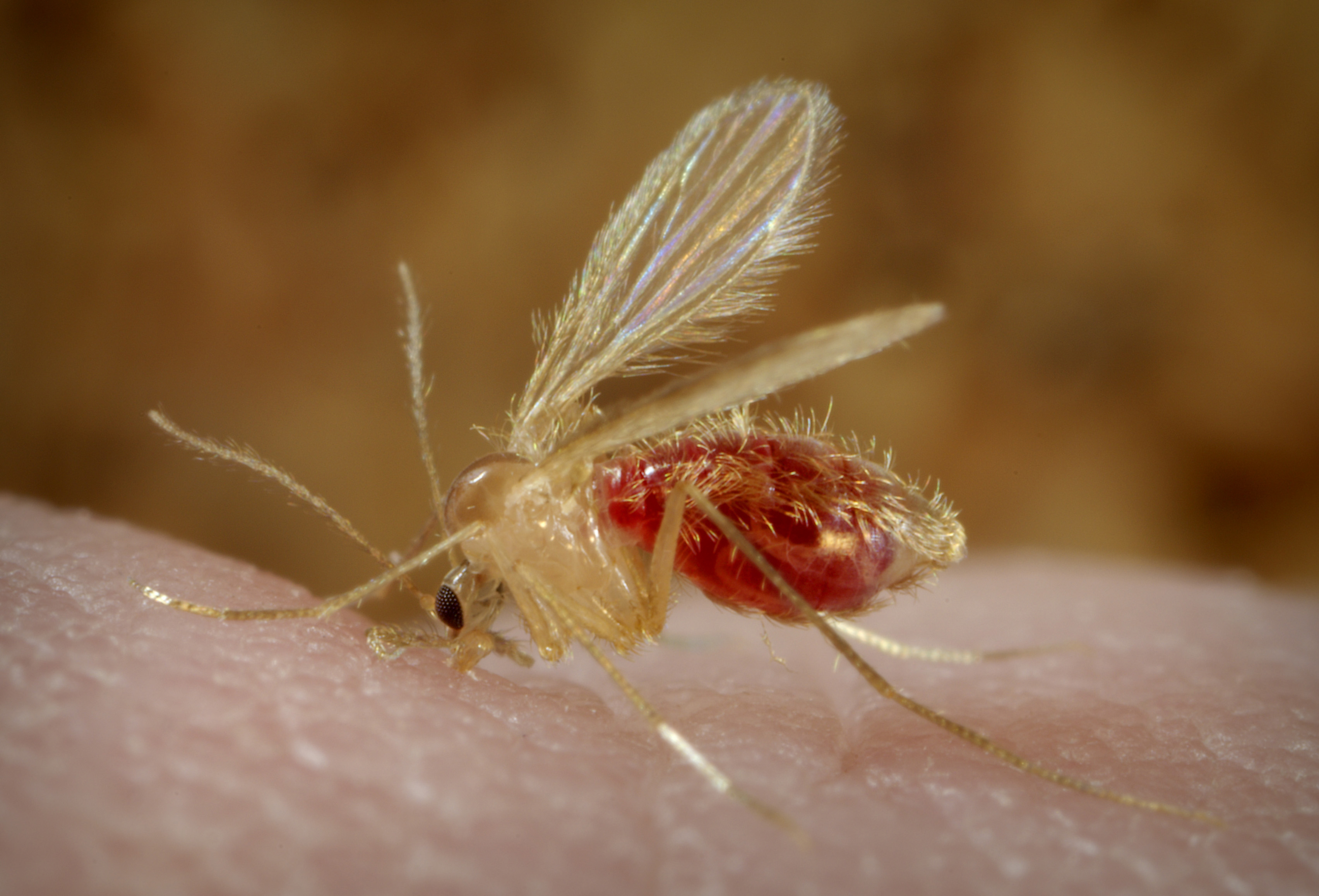
- Phlebotomus papatasi

Scientific classification
- Kingdom: Animalia
- Phylum: Arthropoda
- Clade: Pancrustacea
- Class: Insecta
- Order: Diptera
- Family: Psychodidae
- Subfamily: Phlebotominae; Rondani, 1840

= Phlebotominae =

Sand flies Temporal range: Barremian–Recent

Subfamily of flies

The Phlebotominae are a subfamily of the family Psychodidae. In several countries, their common name is sandfly, but that name is also applied to other flies. The Phlebotominae include many genera of blood-feeding (hematophagous) flies, including the primary vectors of leishmaniasis, bartonellosis, and pappataci fever.

Sandflies are small; a body size of about 3 mm in length is typical for many species, which aids them in escaping notice. Their bite is not always felt, but leaves a small, round, reddish bump that starts itching hours or days later. Use of insect repellent is recommended in areas where sandflies are present.

== Diet and reproduction ==
Phlebotomine sandflies have a diet that includes both blood and plant-derived sugar meals. Phlebotomine females, and only females, suck blood from various mammals, reptiles, and birds, while both sexes consume sugary substances including nectar, honeydew, and phloem sap from plants.

Some species are selective about their hosts, whereas others bite any suitable host they find. Some species can produce one clutch of eggs before their first blood meal; such females are said to practise autogenous or partly autogenous reproduction. Other species need a blood meal before they can produce any eggs at all; they are said to practise anautogenous reproduction. As far as is known, all species need a blood meal for every following clutch of eggs. Proteins and other nutrients in the blood they eat enable the females to produce the proteins and fats necessary for them to produce eggs after using up their bodily food stores. In feeding on blood, the flies use their mouthparts to initiate bleeding from the host. They then suck up the exposed blood. Like practically all blood-feeding parasites, they inject biochemicals that inhibit blood clotting, plus some that stimulate host mast cells to produce histamine; this distends capillary vessels, thereby promoting blood flow.

One blood meal can support the production of about 100 eggs. Females lay their eggs in humid soil rich in organic matter. Laboratory colonies of various phlebotomine sandfly species have been established for experimental study.

A 2018 study showed that several sandfly species in different parts of the world displayed a notable preference for Cannabis sativa as part of their plant-derived diet, suggesting it might be highly attractive to them.

== Methods for studying phlebotomine sandflies ==
Phlebotomine sandflies are small and fragile insects, requiring careful handling during specimen preparation. For taxonomic study, specimens are typically cleared and mounted on microscope slides, with the genitalia usually mounted separately to facilitate identification. Certain organs, such as the gut and salivary glands, may also be dissected and examined for the detection of parasites, including leishmaniasis agents such as Leishmania, as well as associated viruses.

== Health concerns ==
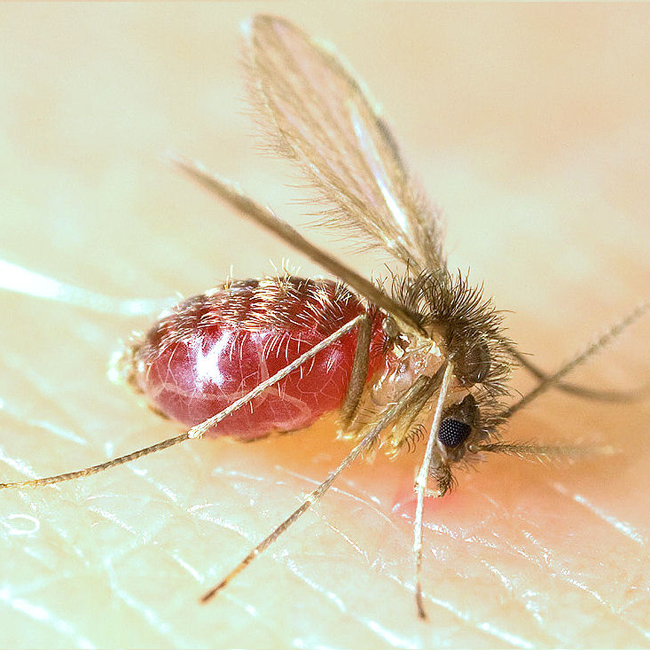
Lutzomyia longipalpis feeding on human blood

As sandfly females suck blood from vertebrates, including humans, they can transmit leishmaniasis, arboviruses, and bartonellosis. In the New World, leishmaniasis is spread by sandflies in the genus Lutzomyia, which commonly live in caves, where their main hosts are bats. In the Old World, sandflies in the genus Phlebotomus spread leishmaniasis.

== Distribution ==
Phlebotomine sandflies can be found between the latitudes 50°N and 40°S, but are absent from New Zealand and the Pacific Islands.

== Genera ==
- Australophlebotomus Theodor, 1948
- Bichromomyia Artemiev, 1991
- Brumptomyia França & Parrot, 1921 (Mexico to South America)
- Chinius Leng, 1985 (2 species: China, Thailand)
- Dampfomyia Addis, 1945
- Deanemyia Galati, 1995
- Evandromyia Mangabeira, 1941
- Edentomyia Galati, Andrade-Filho, da Silva & Falcão, 2003 (Brazil)
- Expapillata Galati, 1995
- Hertigia Fairchild, 1949
- Idiophlebotomus Quate & Fairchild, 1961
- †Libanophlebotomus Azar et al. 1999 Lebanese amber, Barremian
- †Longiphlebes Kaczmarek et al., 2025 Burmese amber, Cenomanian
- Lutzomyia França, 1924 (North and South America)
- Martinsmyia Galati, 1995
- †Mesophlebotomites Azar et al. 1999 Lebanese amber, Barremian
- Micropygomyia Barretto, 1962
- Migonemyia Galati, 1995
- Nyssomyia Barretto, 1962
- Oligodontomyia Galati, 1995
- †Palaeomyia Poinar 2004 Burmese amber, Cenomanian
- †Phlebotomites Hennig 1972 Lebanese amber, Burmese amber, Cenomanian
- †Phlebotoiella Solórzano Kraemer and Wagner 2009 Cambay amber, India, Eocene
- Phlebotomus Rondani, 1995 & Berté, 1840 (Europe, Africa, Asia, Australia)
- Pintomyia Costa Lima, 1932
- Pressatia Mangabeira, 1942
- Psathyromyia Barretto, 1962
- Psychodopygus Mangabeira, 1941
- Sciopemyia Barretto, 1962
- Sergentomyia França & Parrot, 1920 (Europe, Africa, Asia, Australia)
- Trichophoromyia Barretto, 1962
- Viannamyia Mangabeira, 1941
- Warileya Hertig, 1948 (Central and South America)

== Gallery: anatomy of Phlebotominae ==
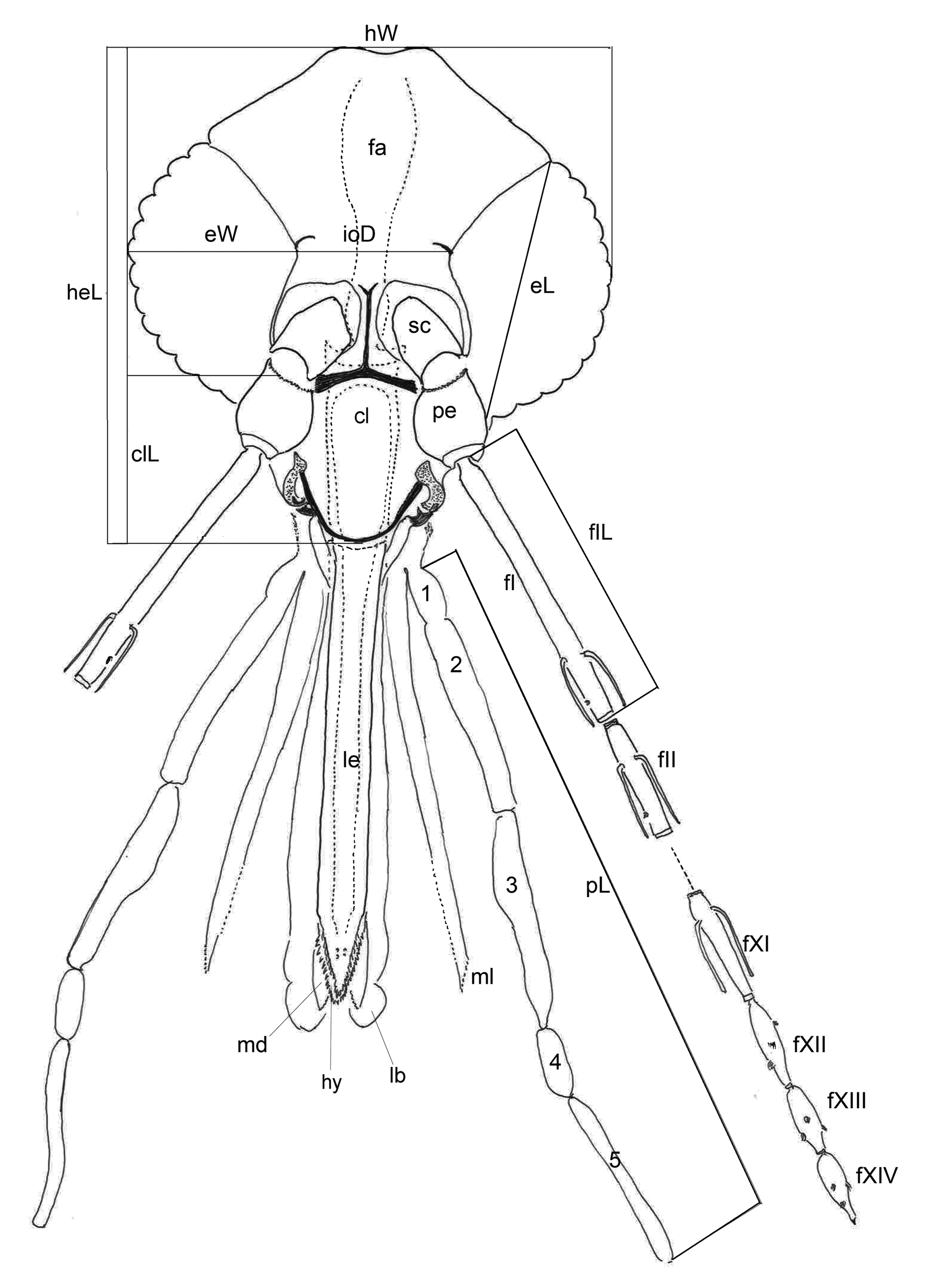
Head

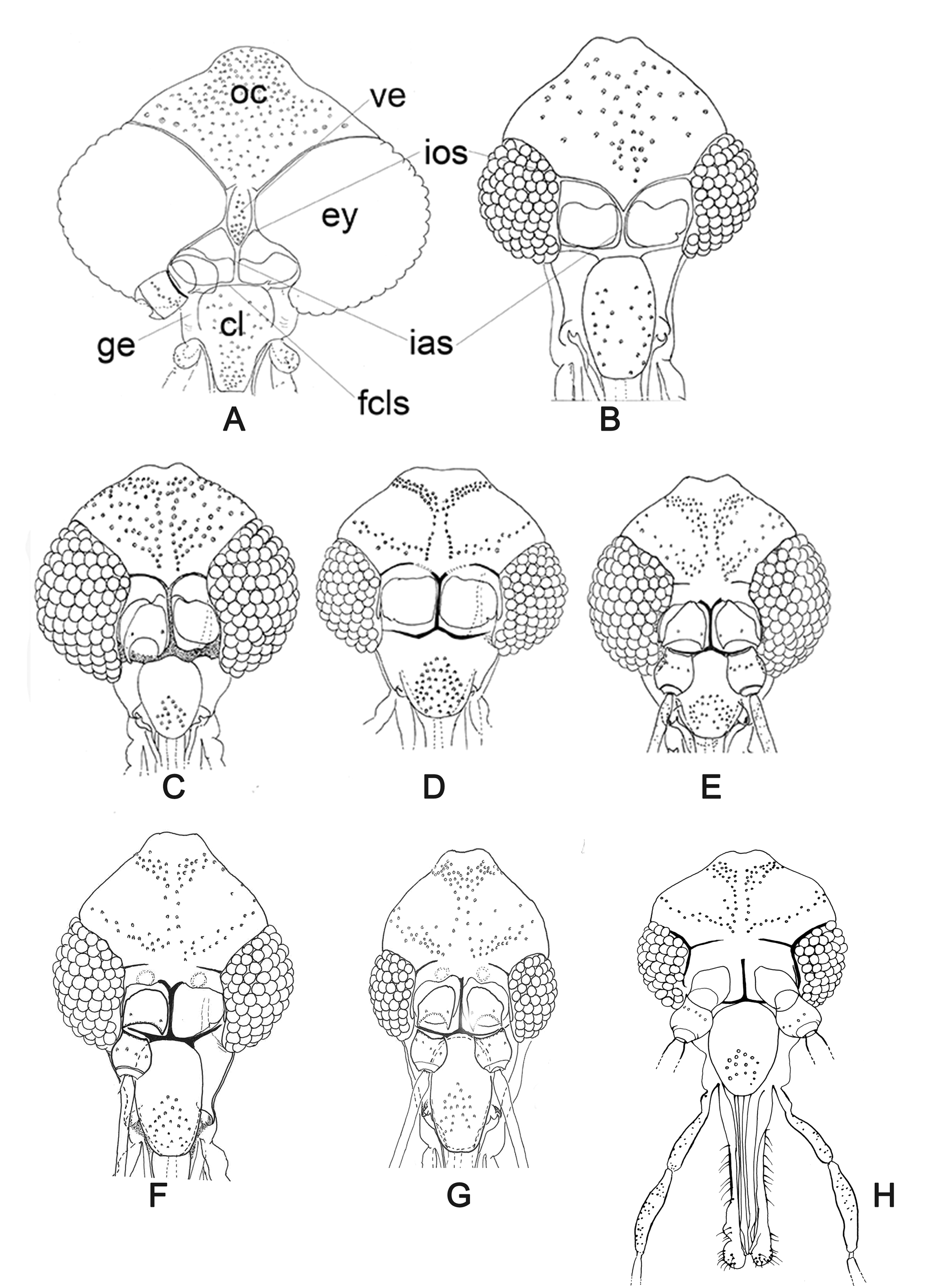
Head

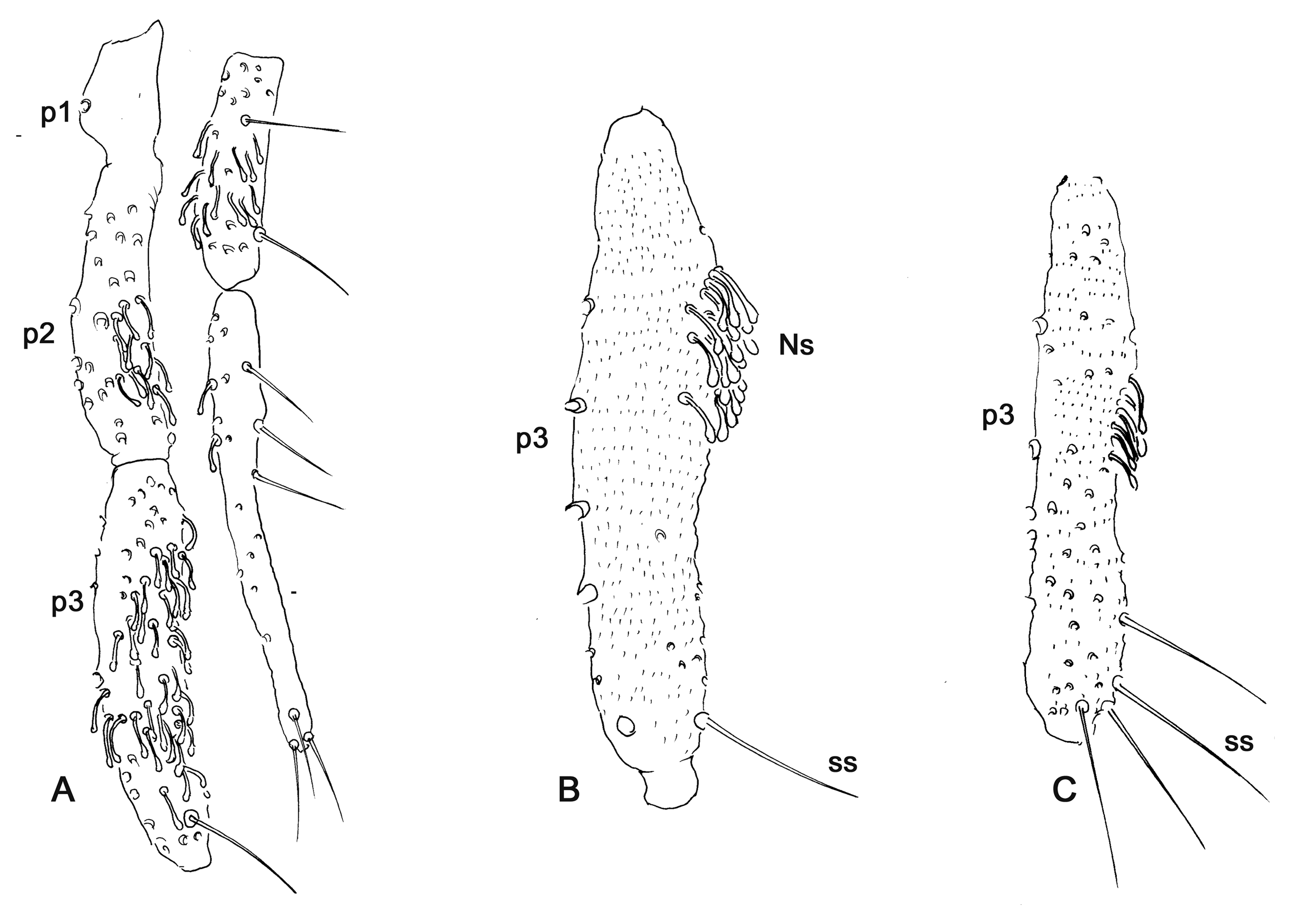
Mouth parts

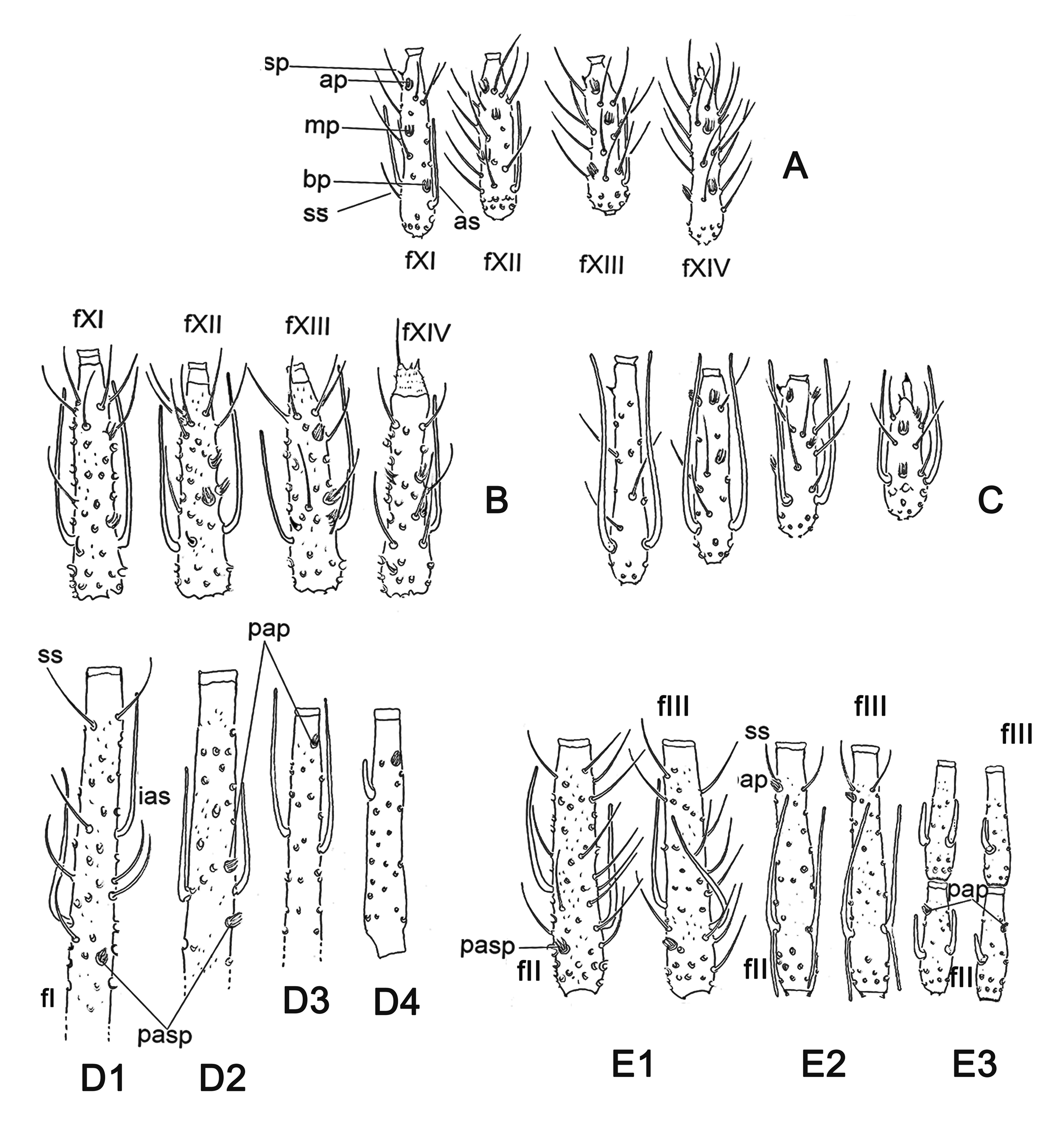
Mouth parts

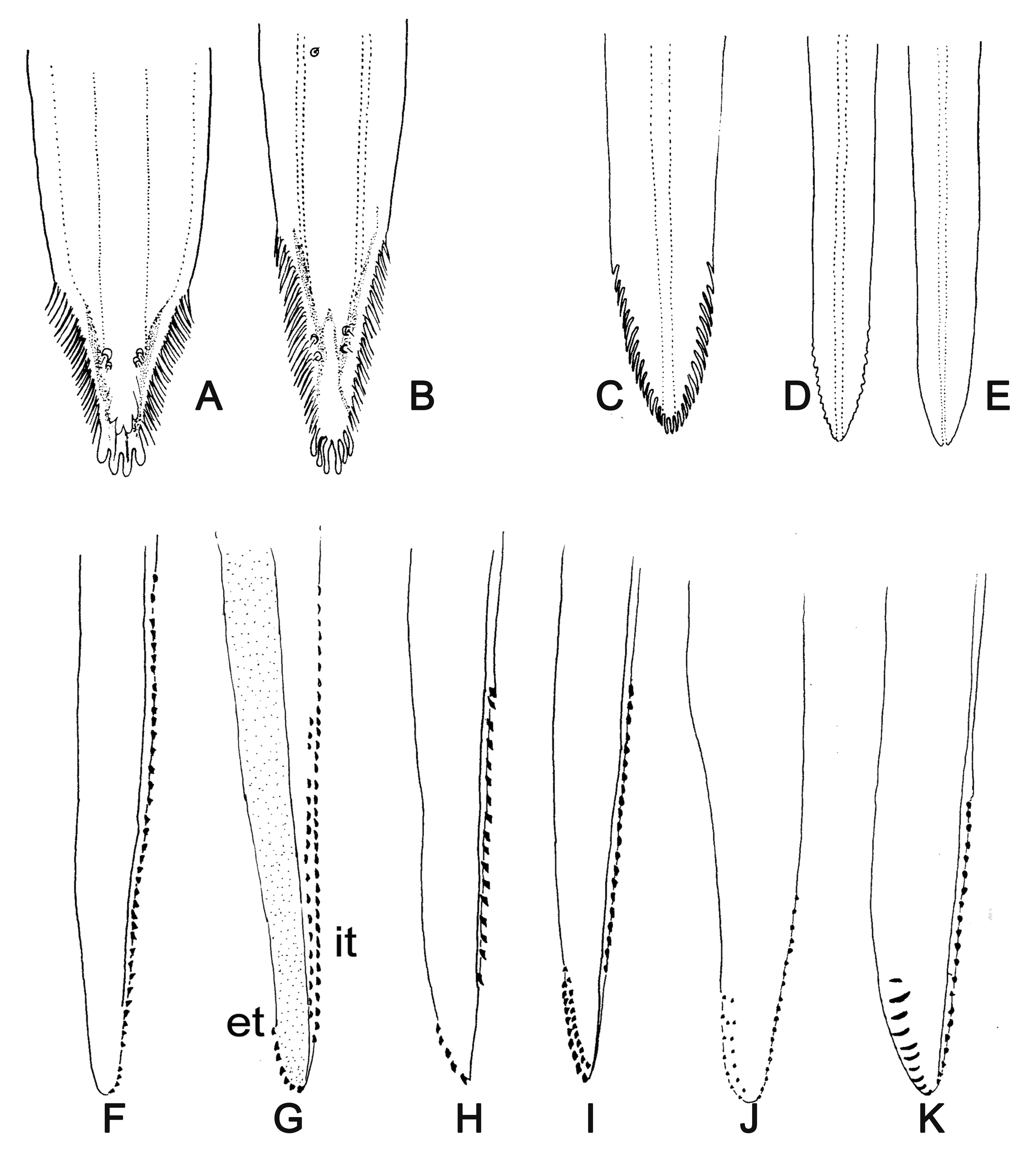
Mouth parts

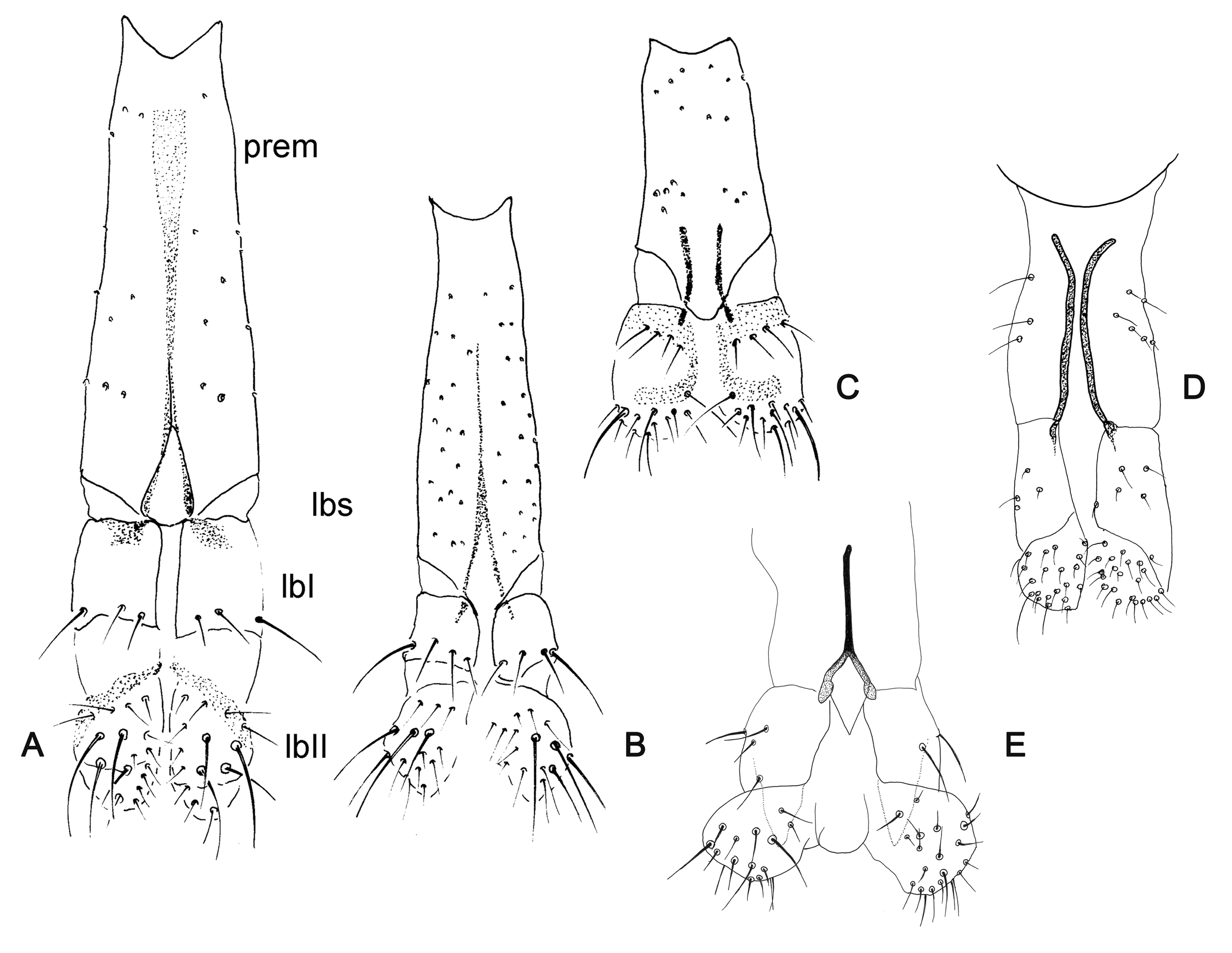
Mouth parts

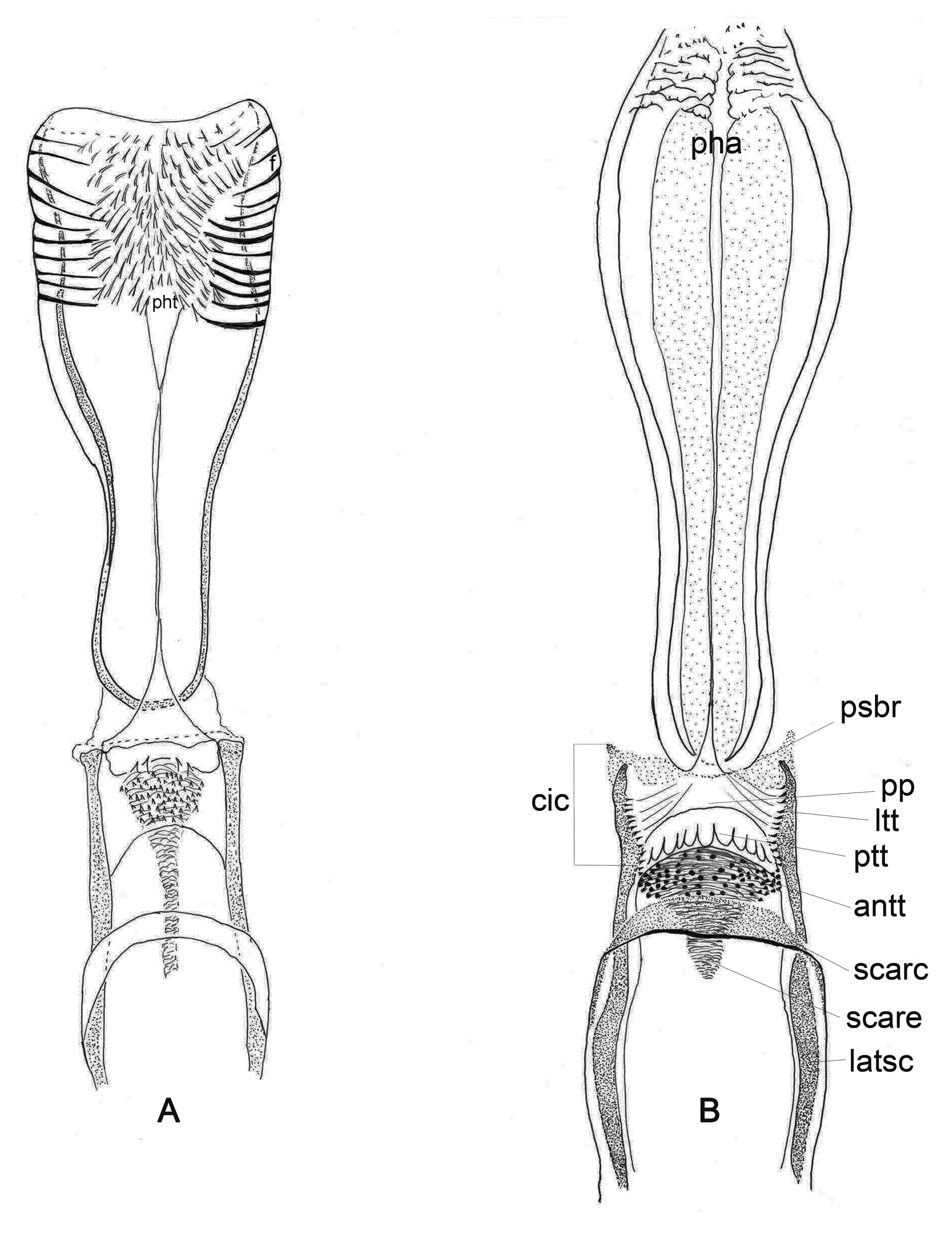
Mouth parts

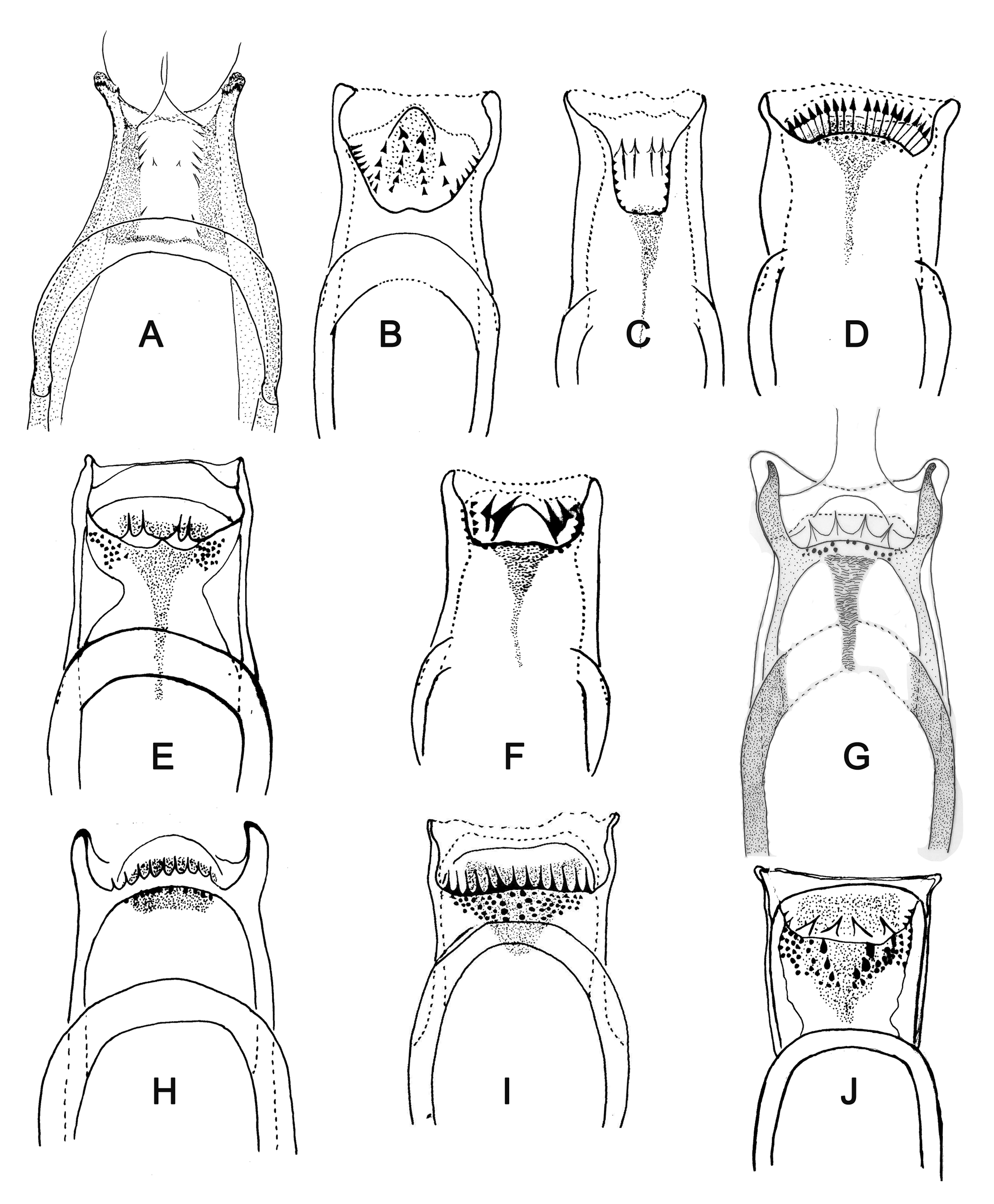
Mouth parts

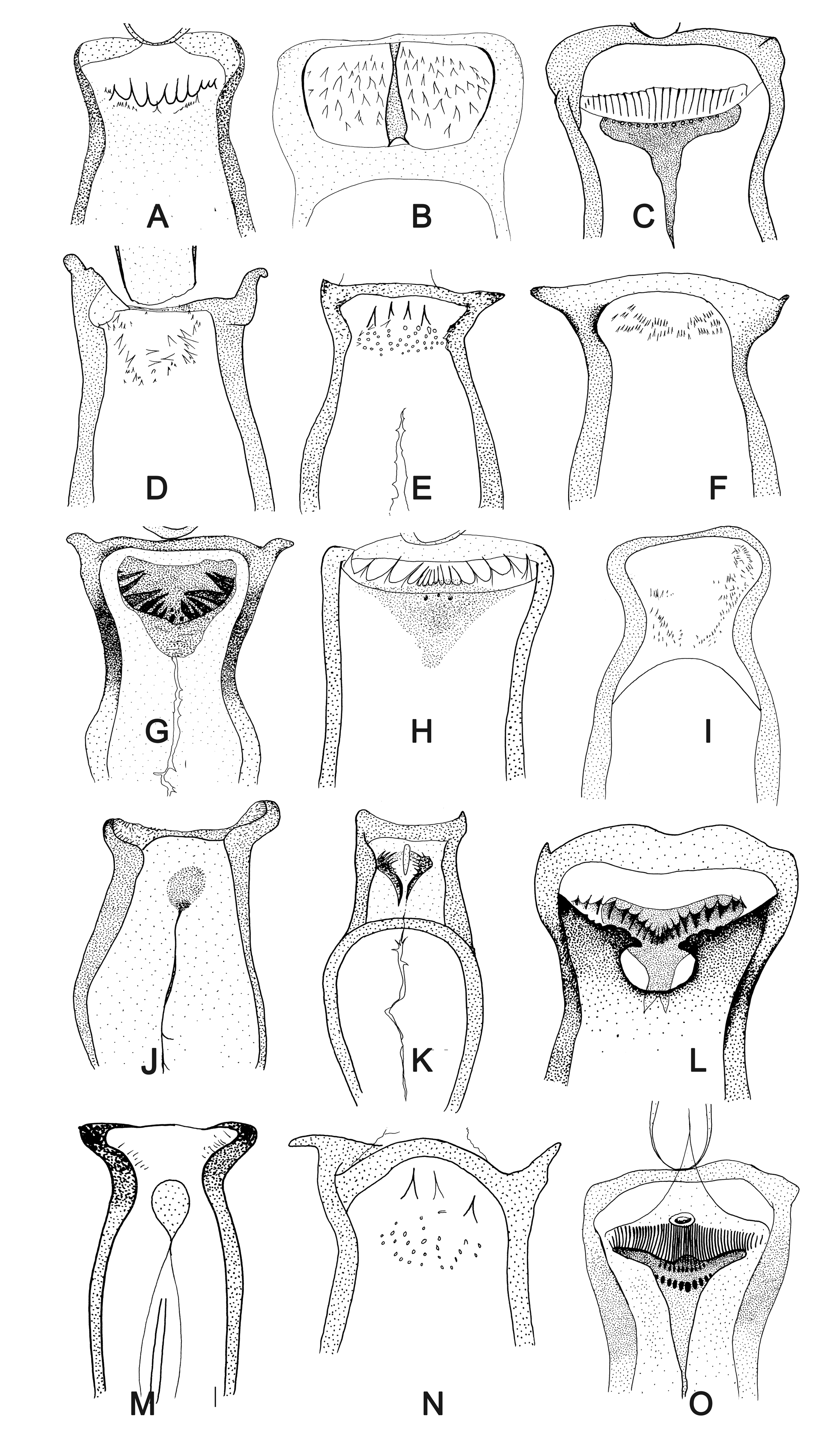

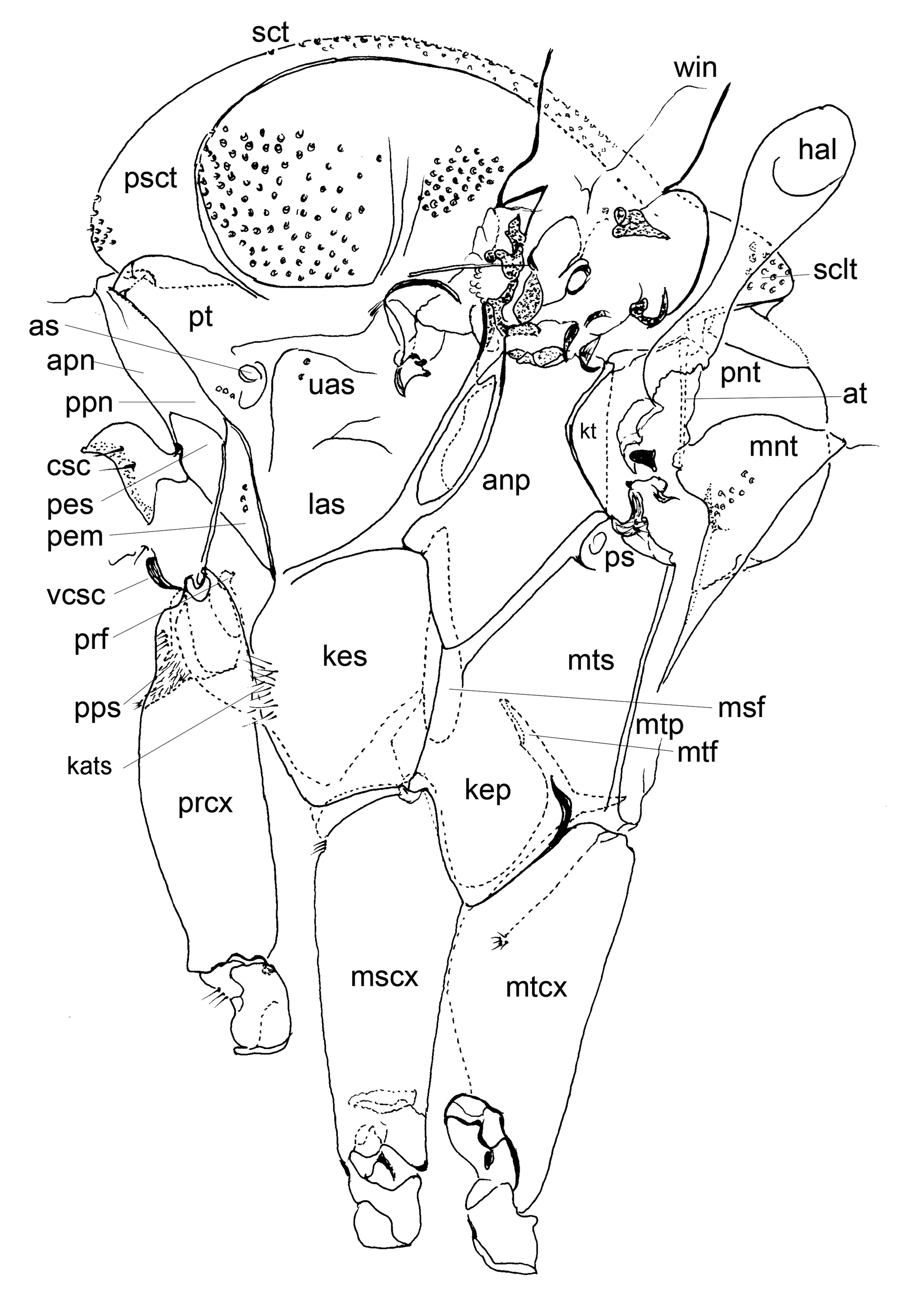
Thorax

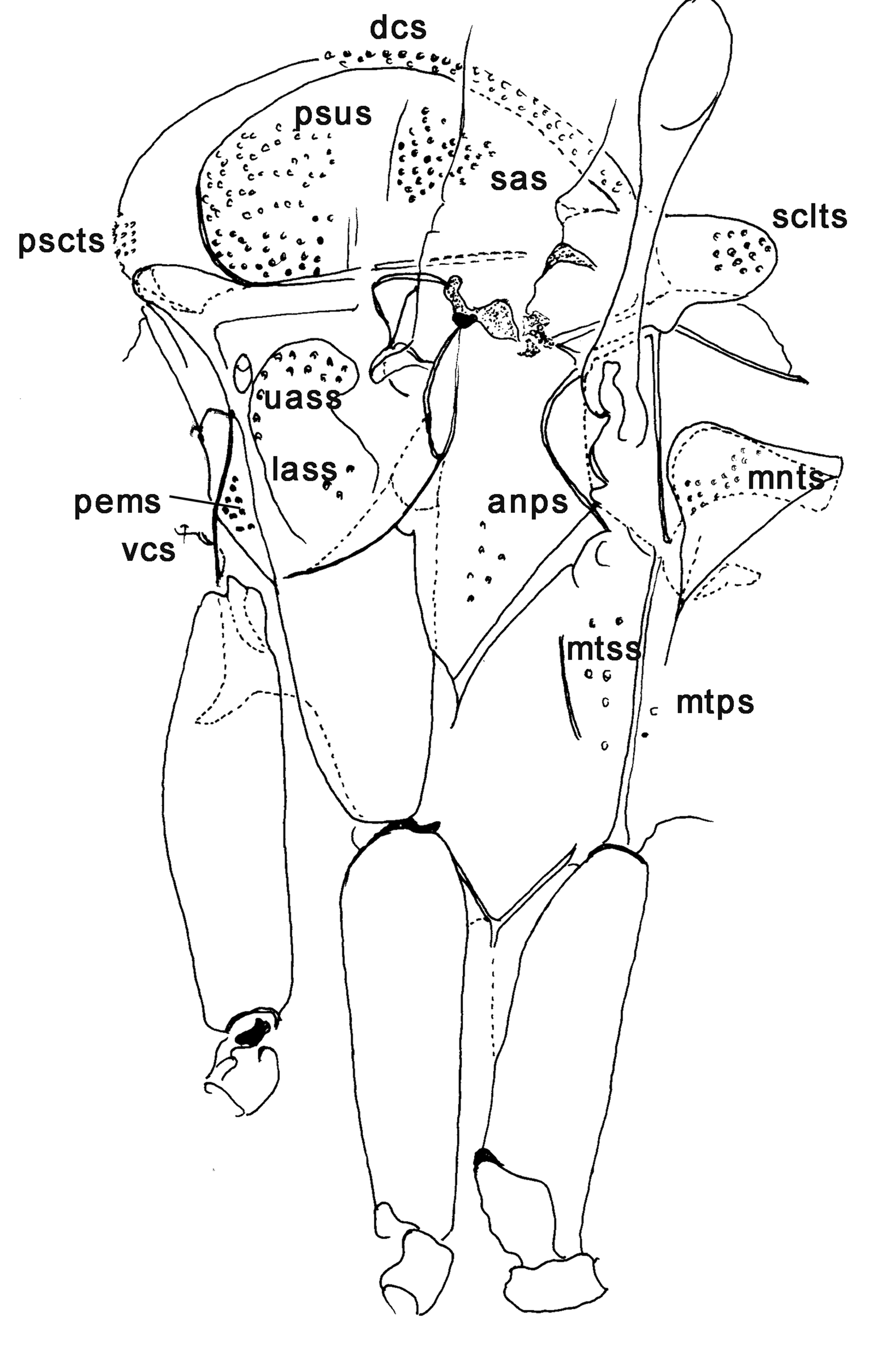
Thorax

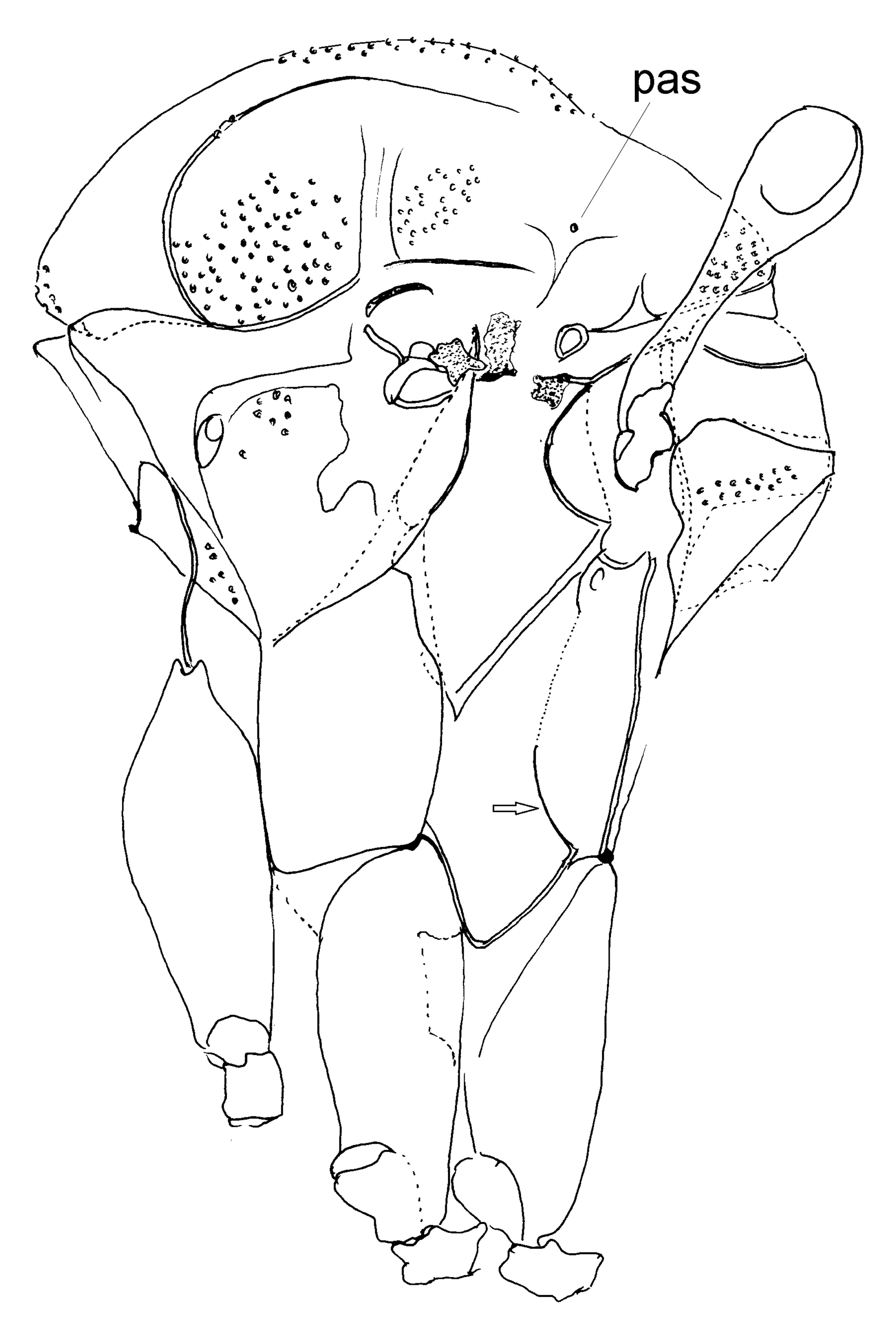
Thorax

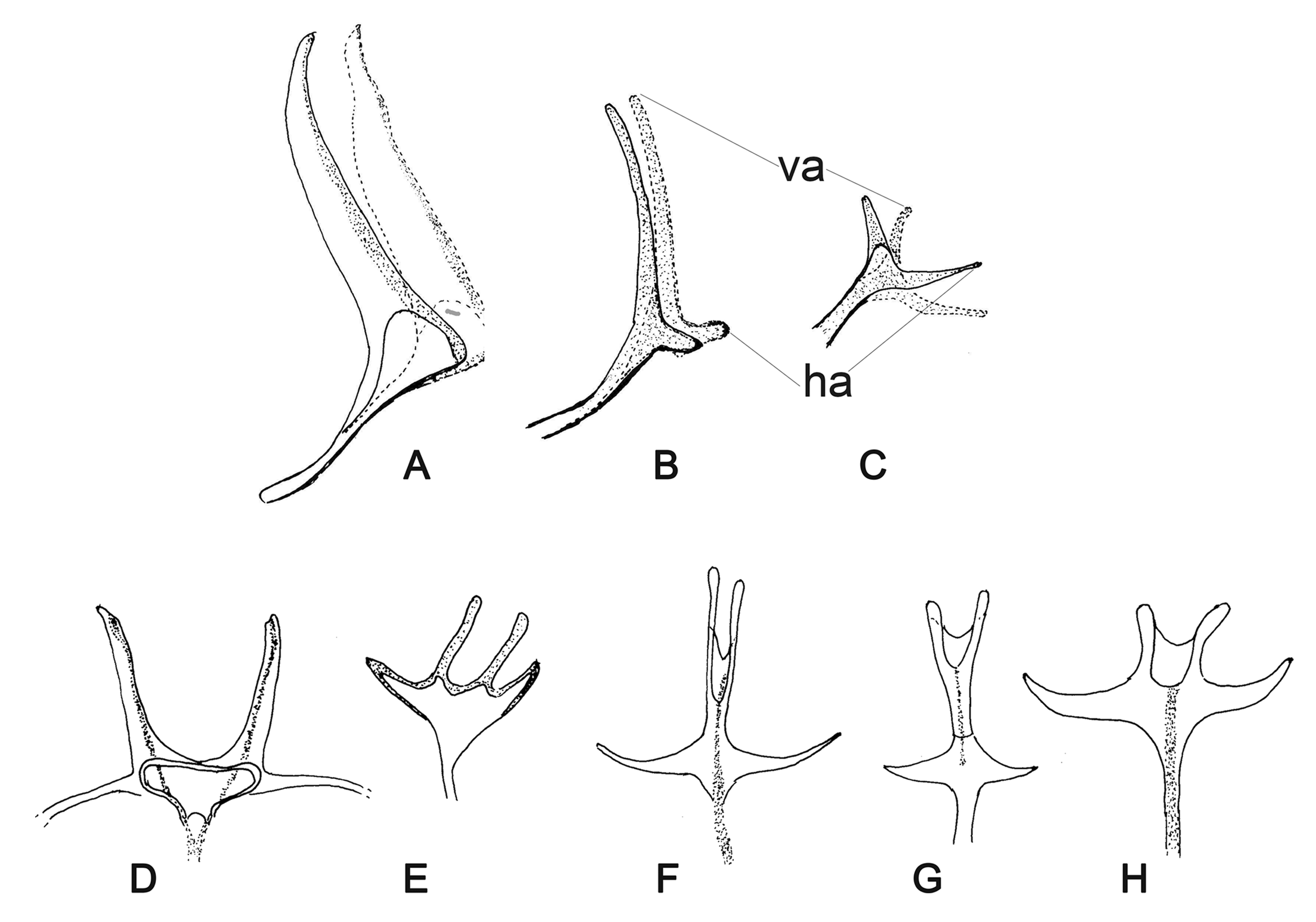
Thorax

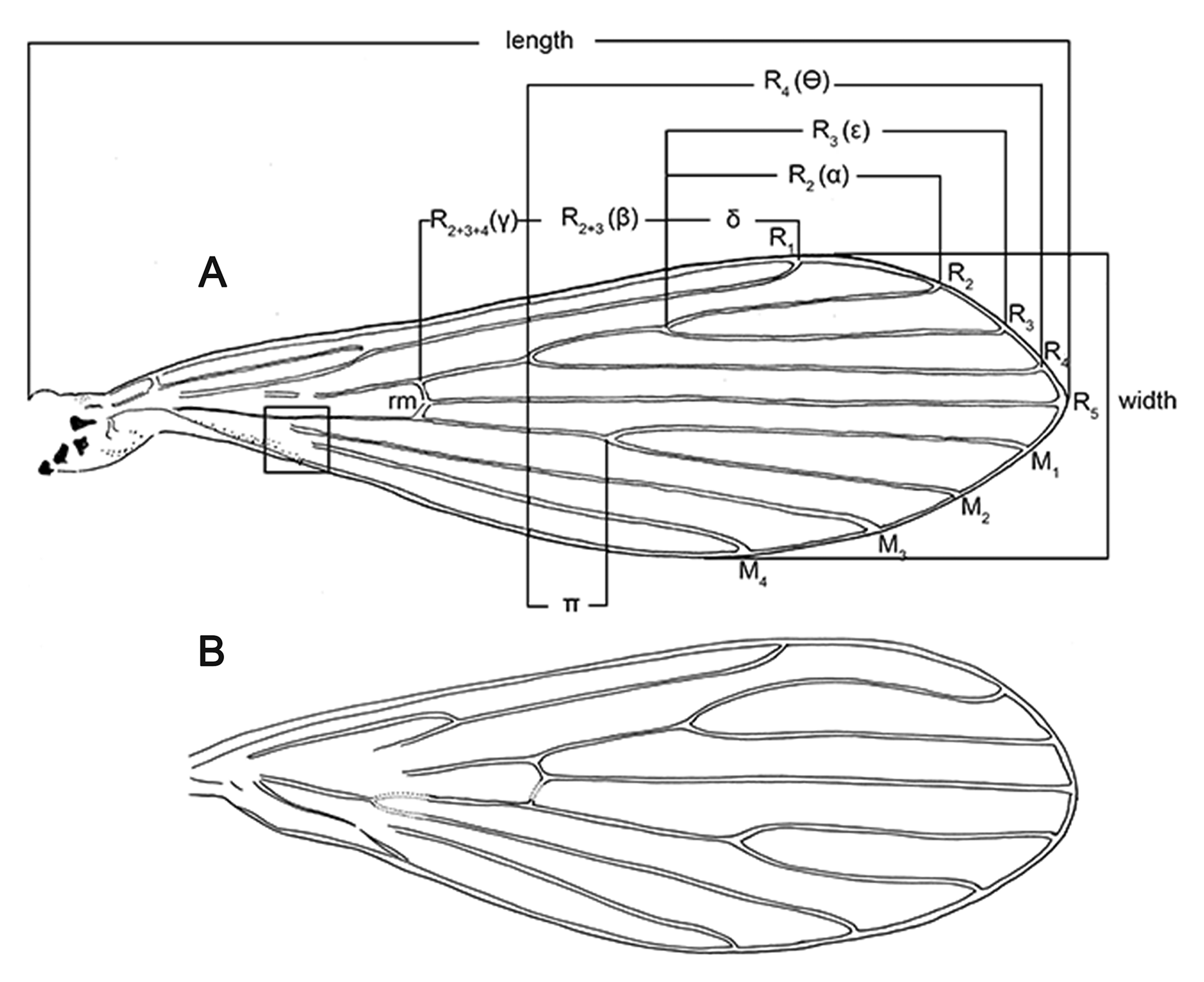
Wing

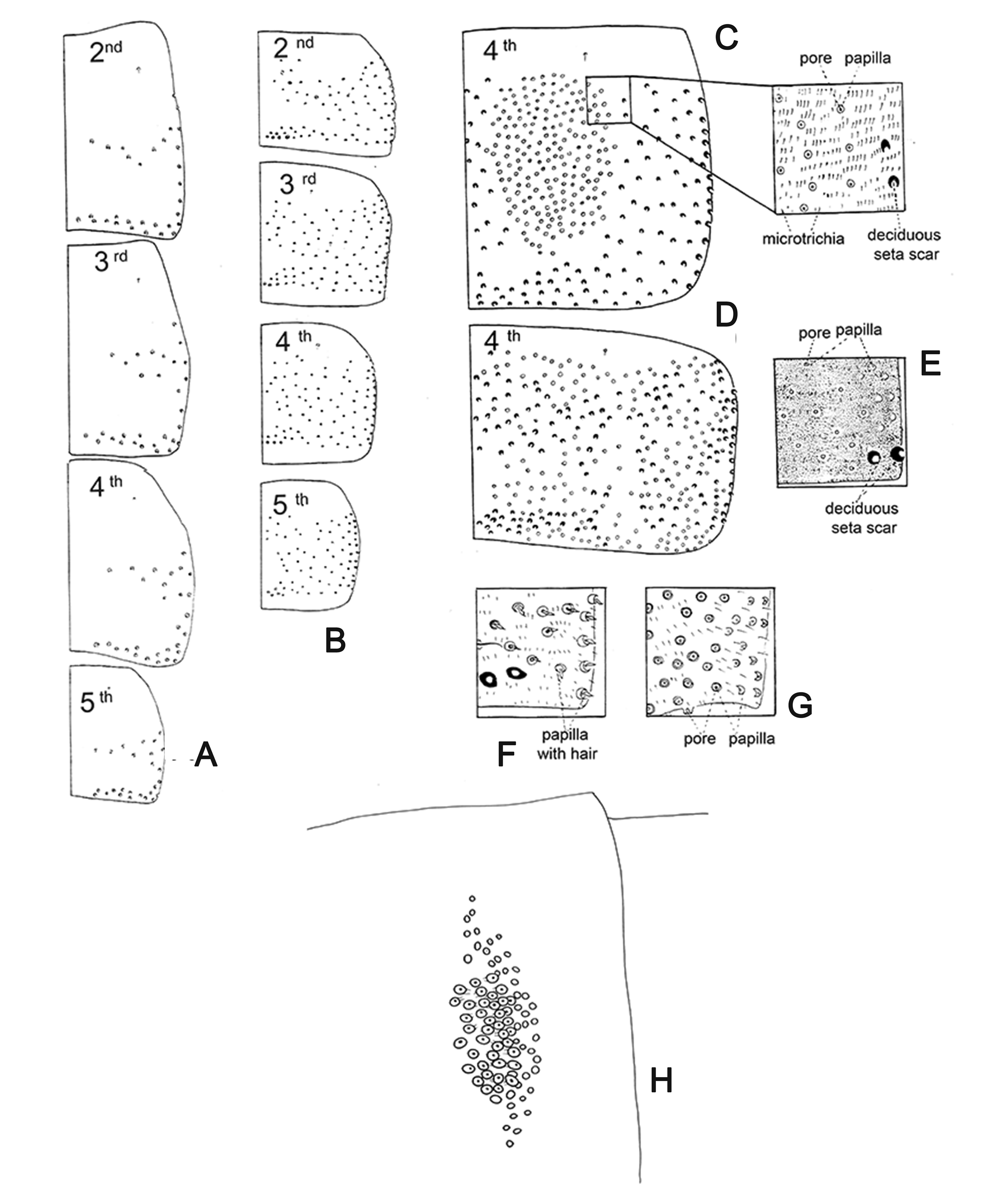
Abdomen

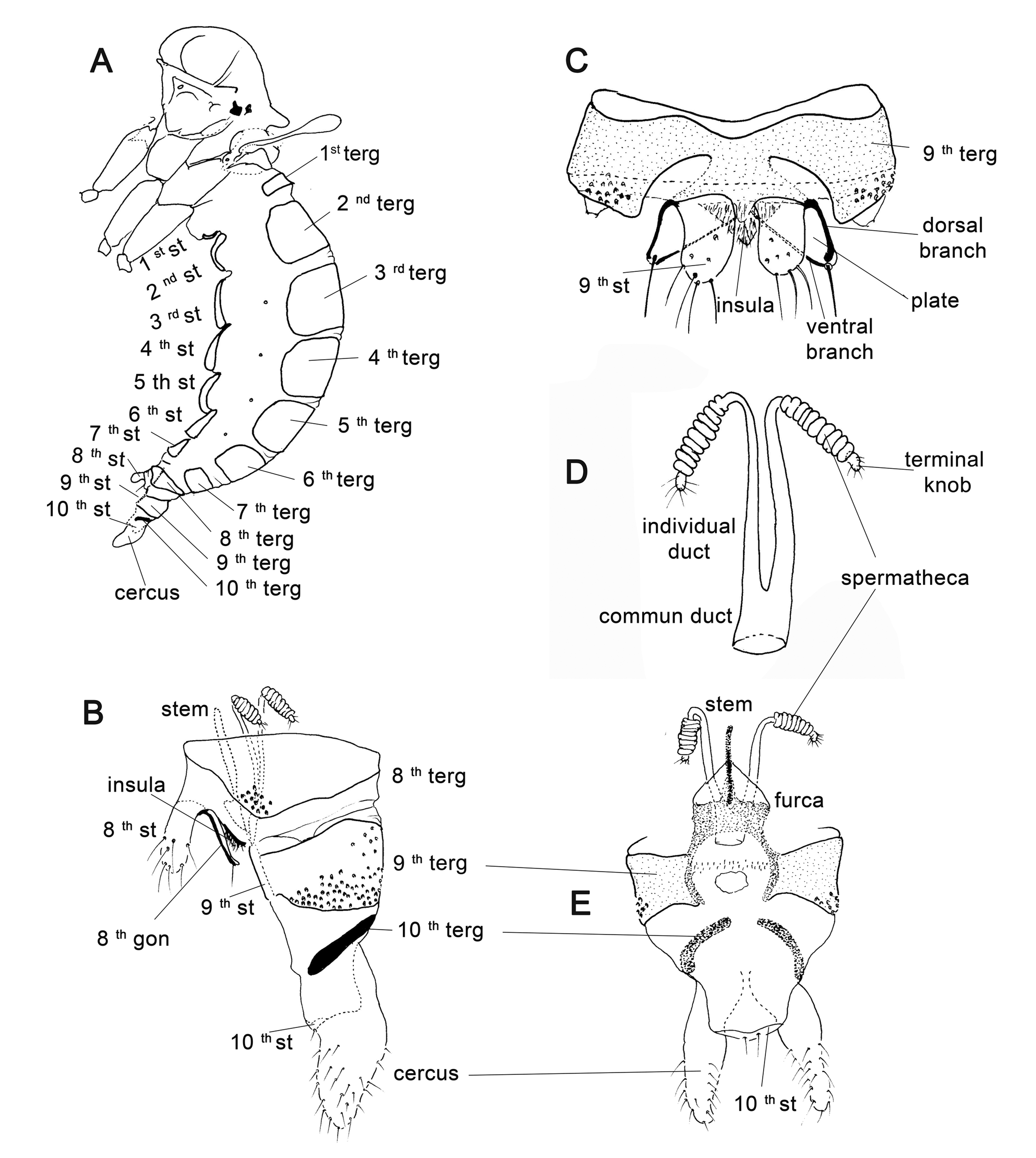
Abdomen

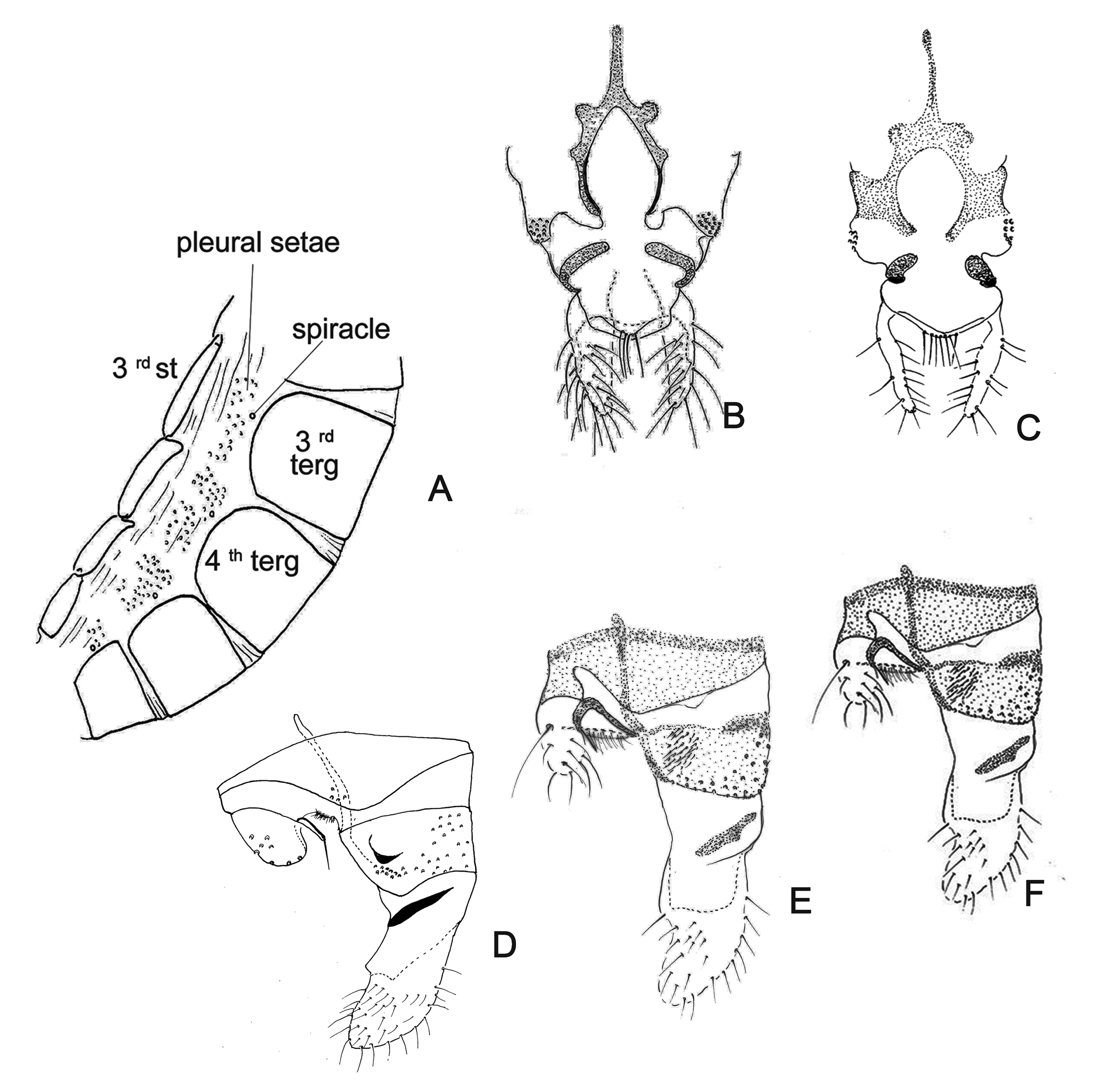
Abdomen

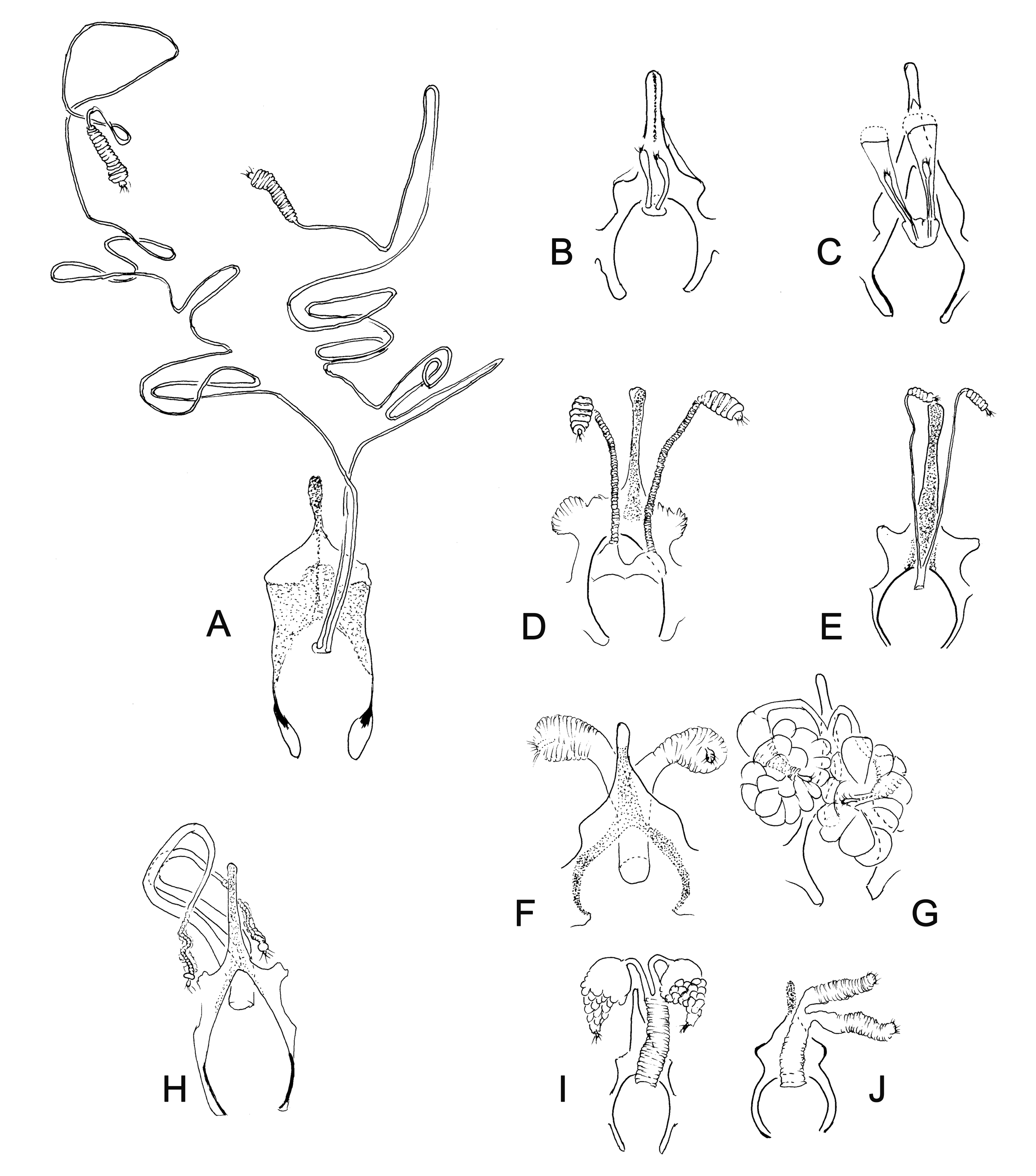
Genitalia

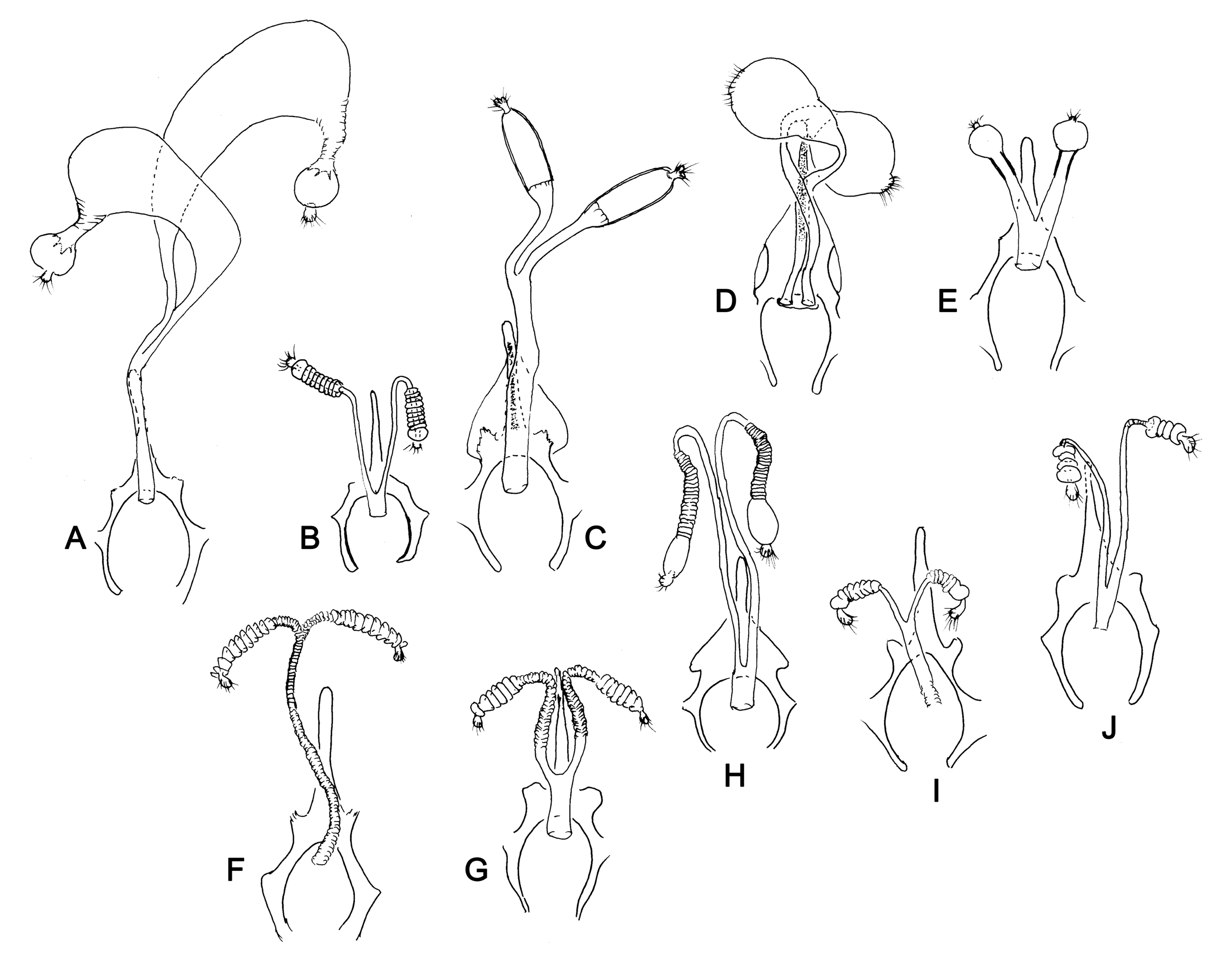
Genitalia

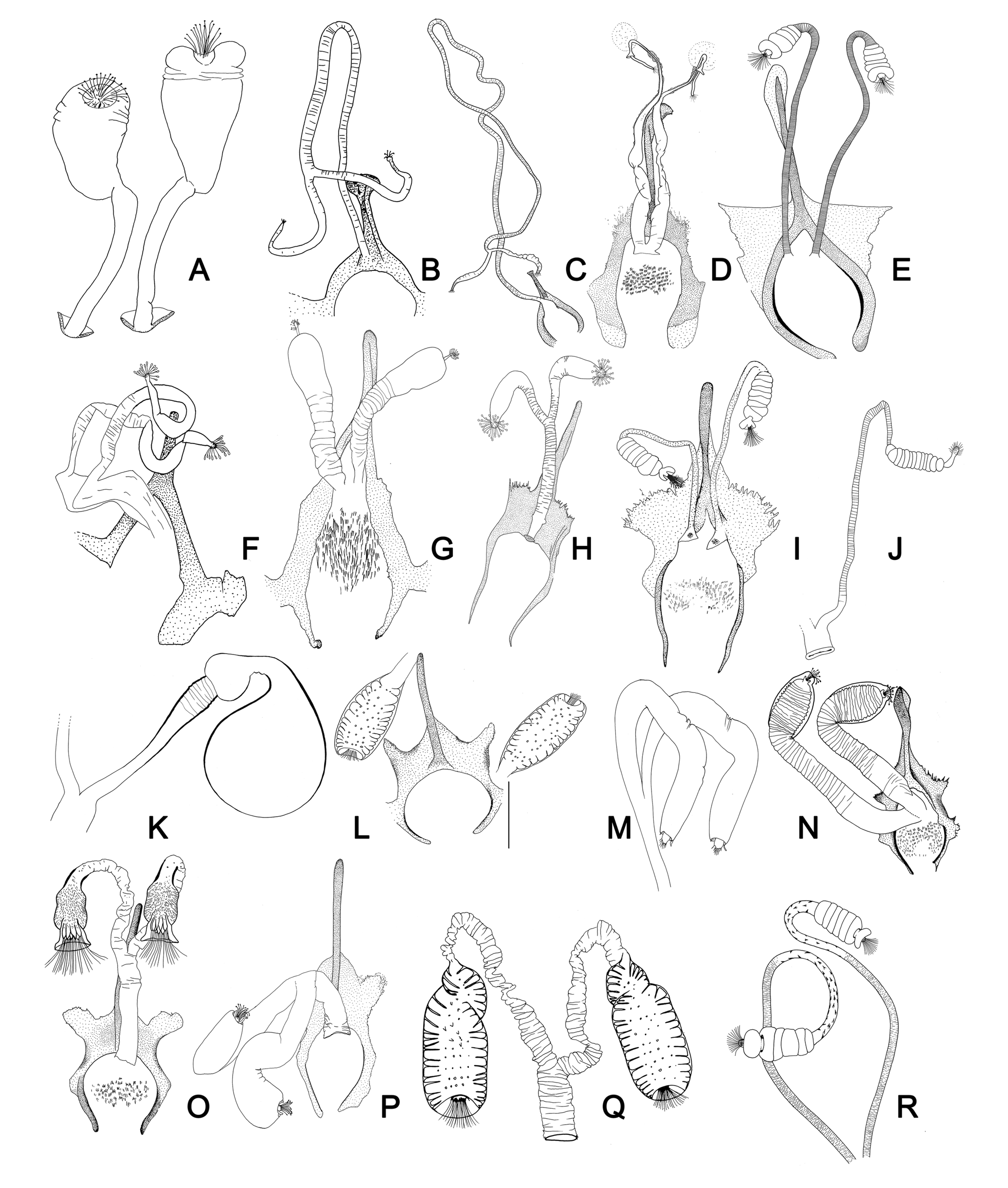
Genitalia

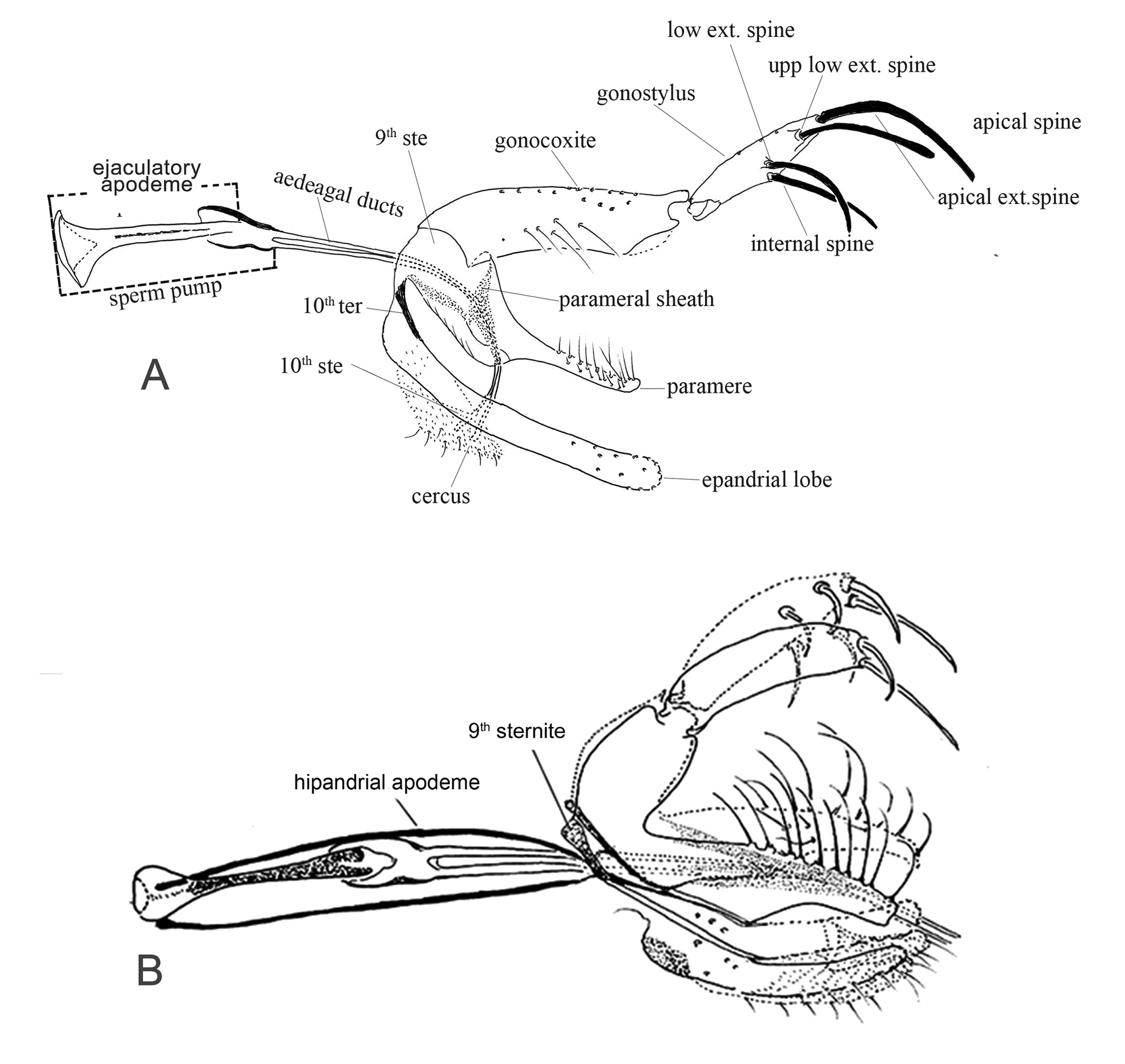
Genitalia

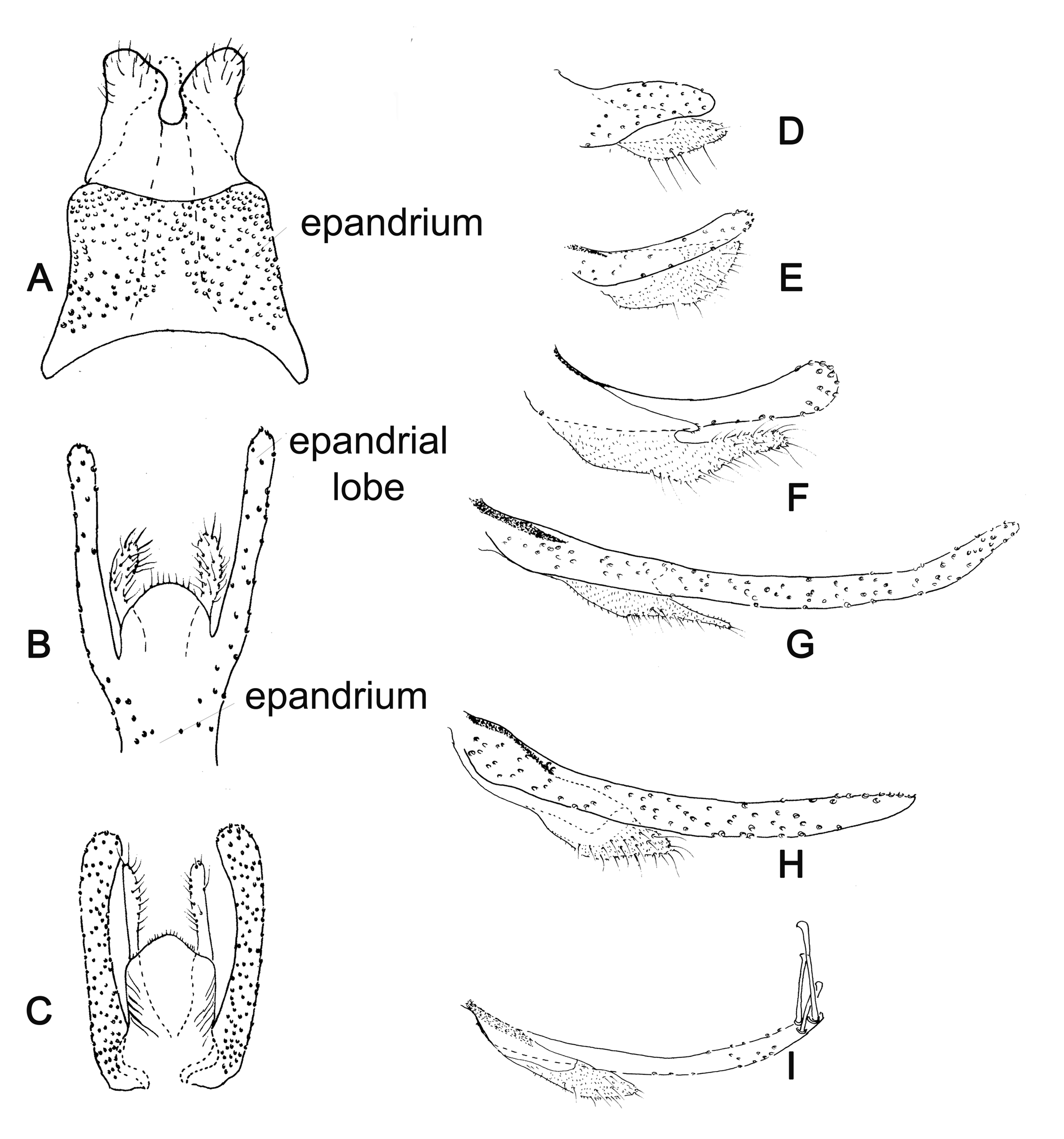
Genitalia

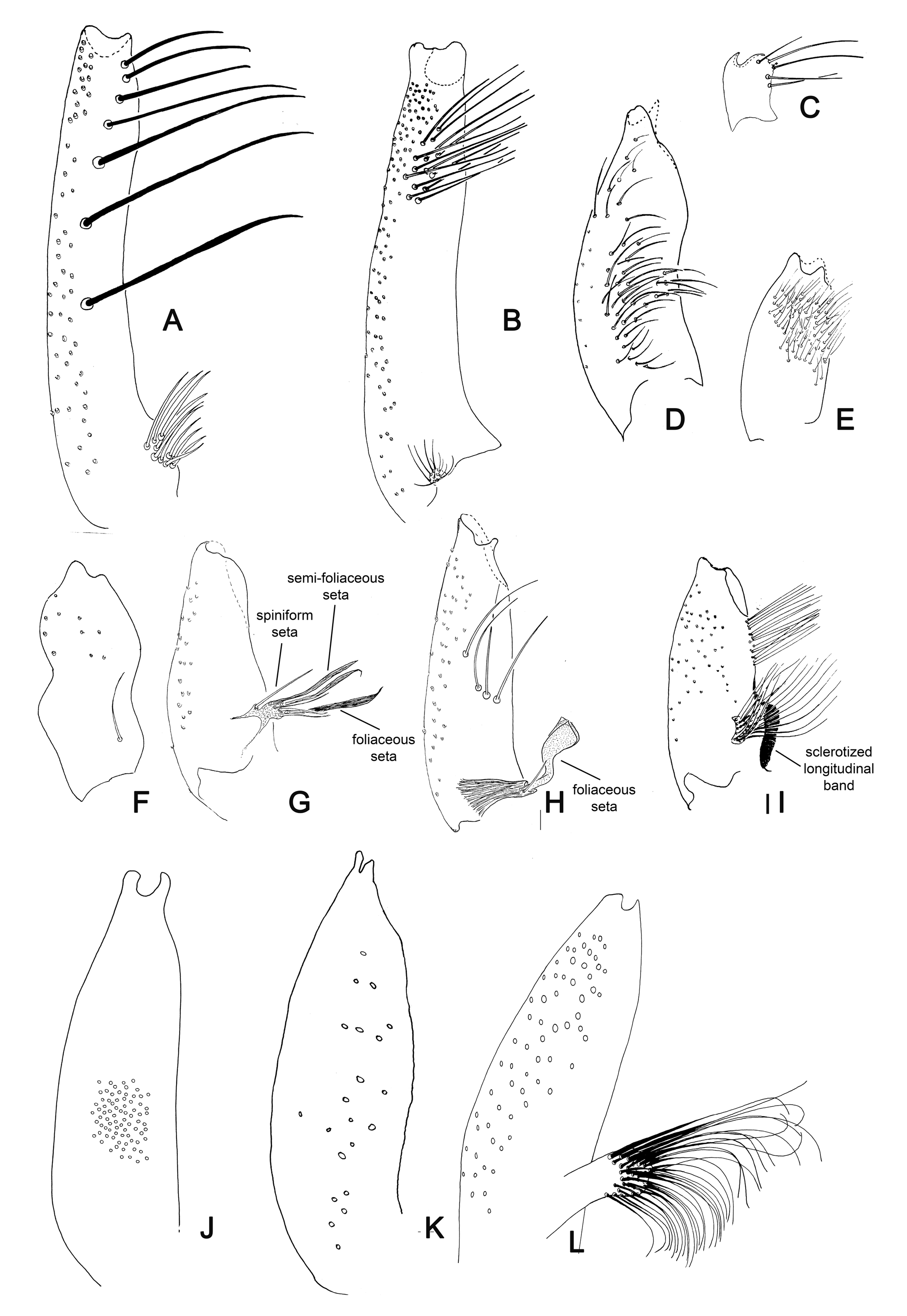
Genitalia

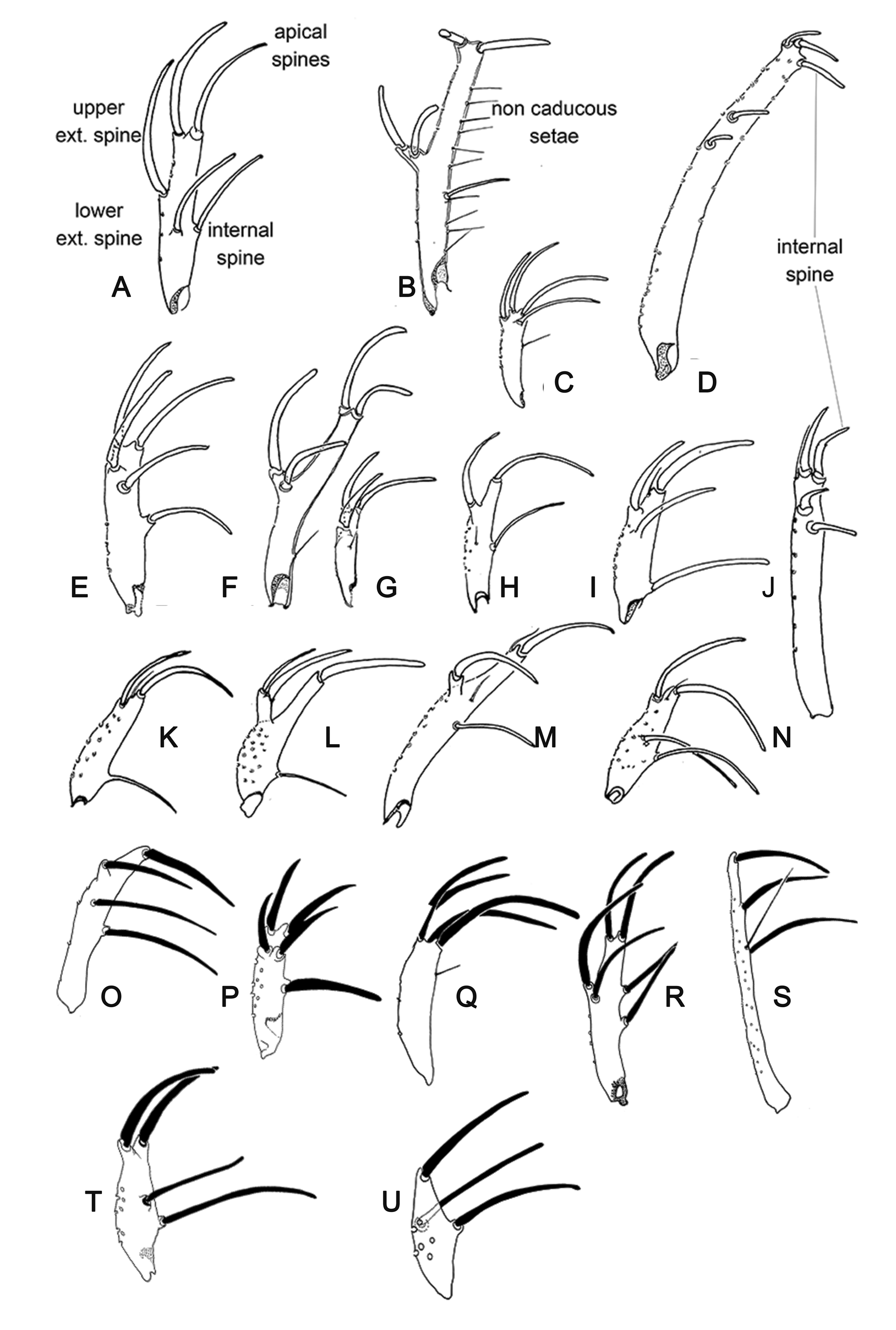
Genitalia

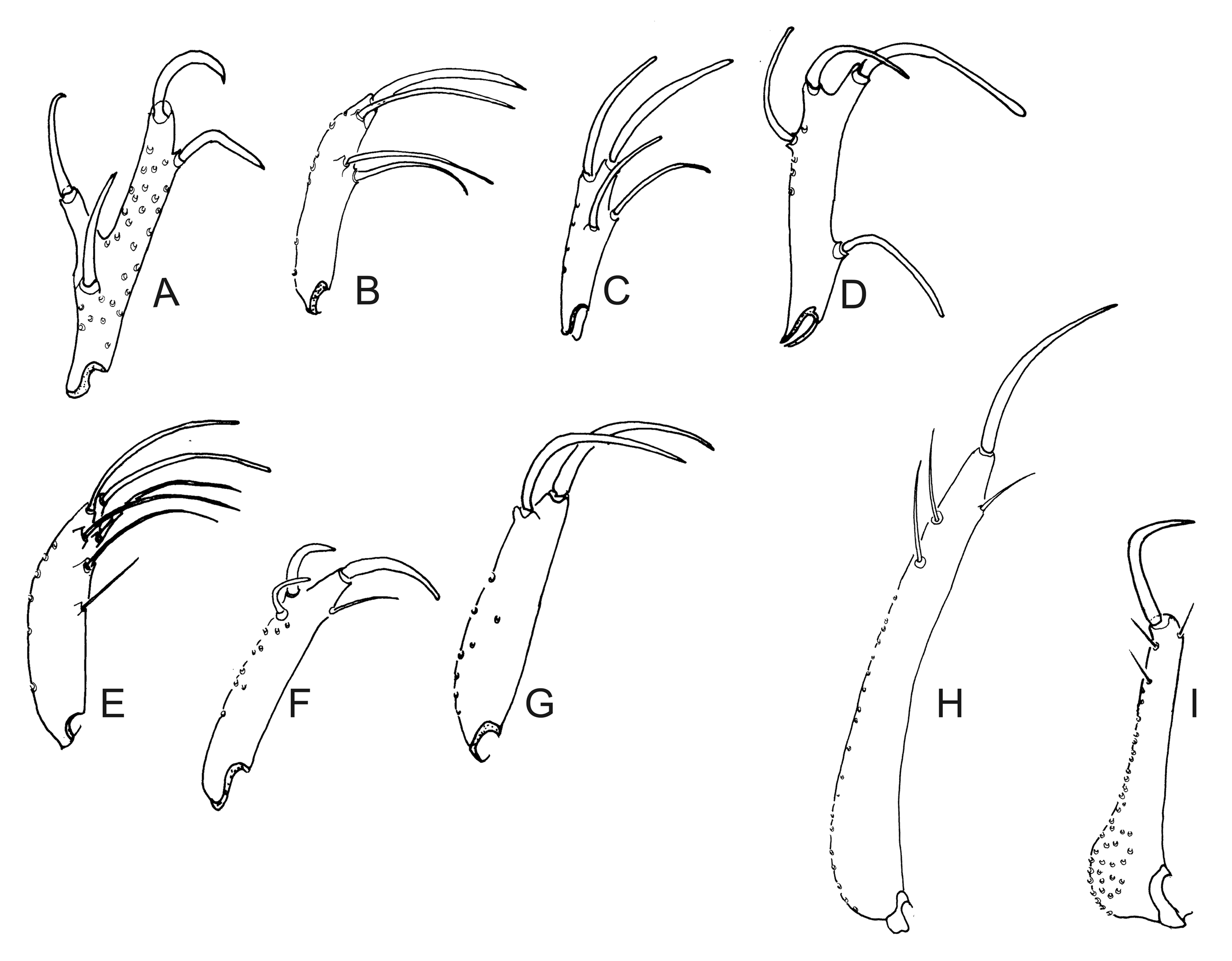
Genitalia

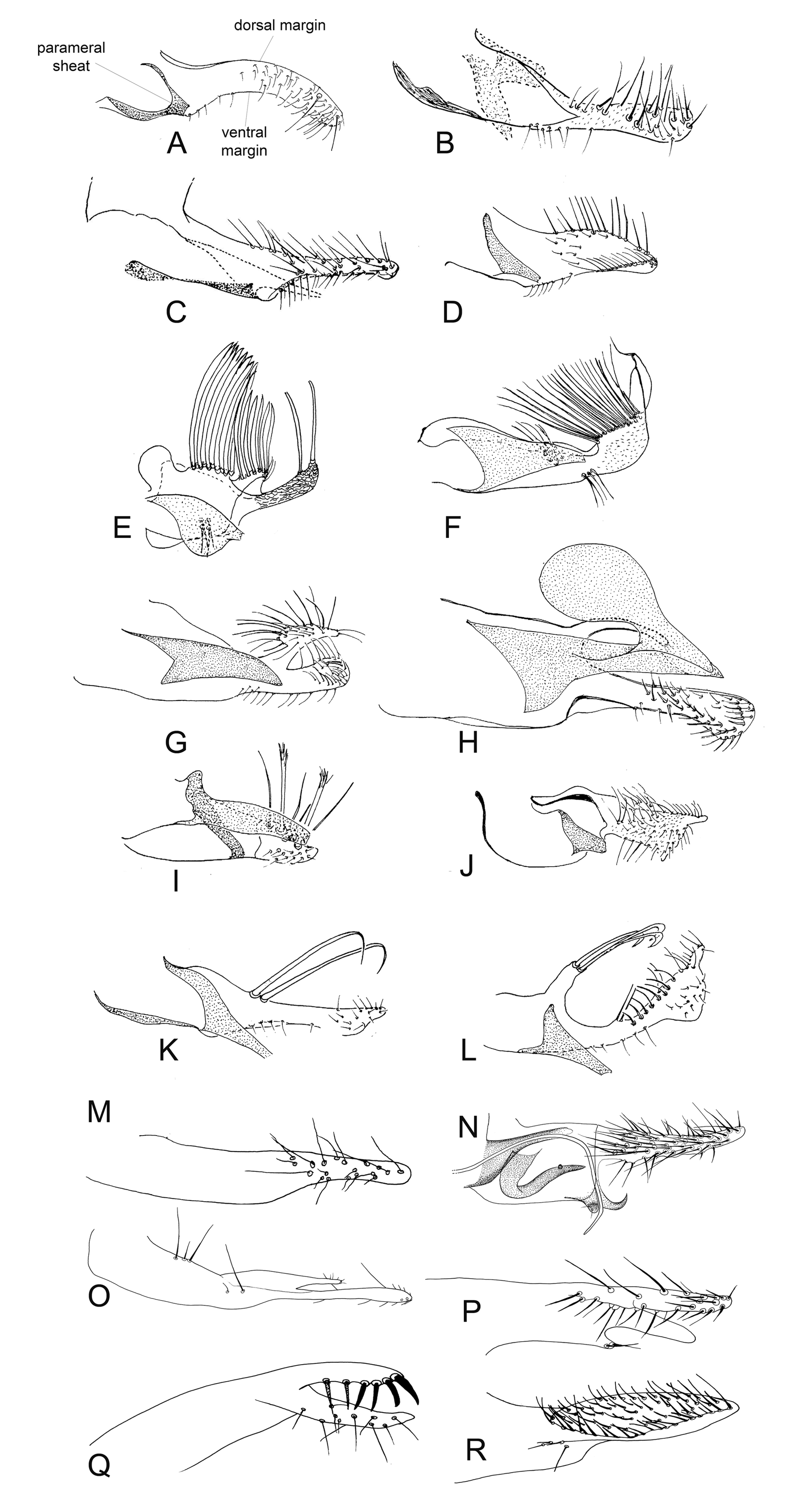
Genitalia

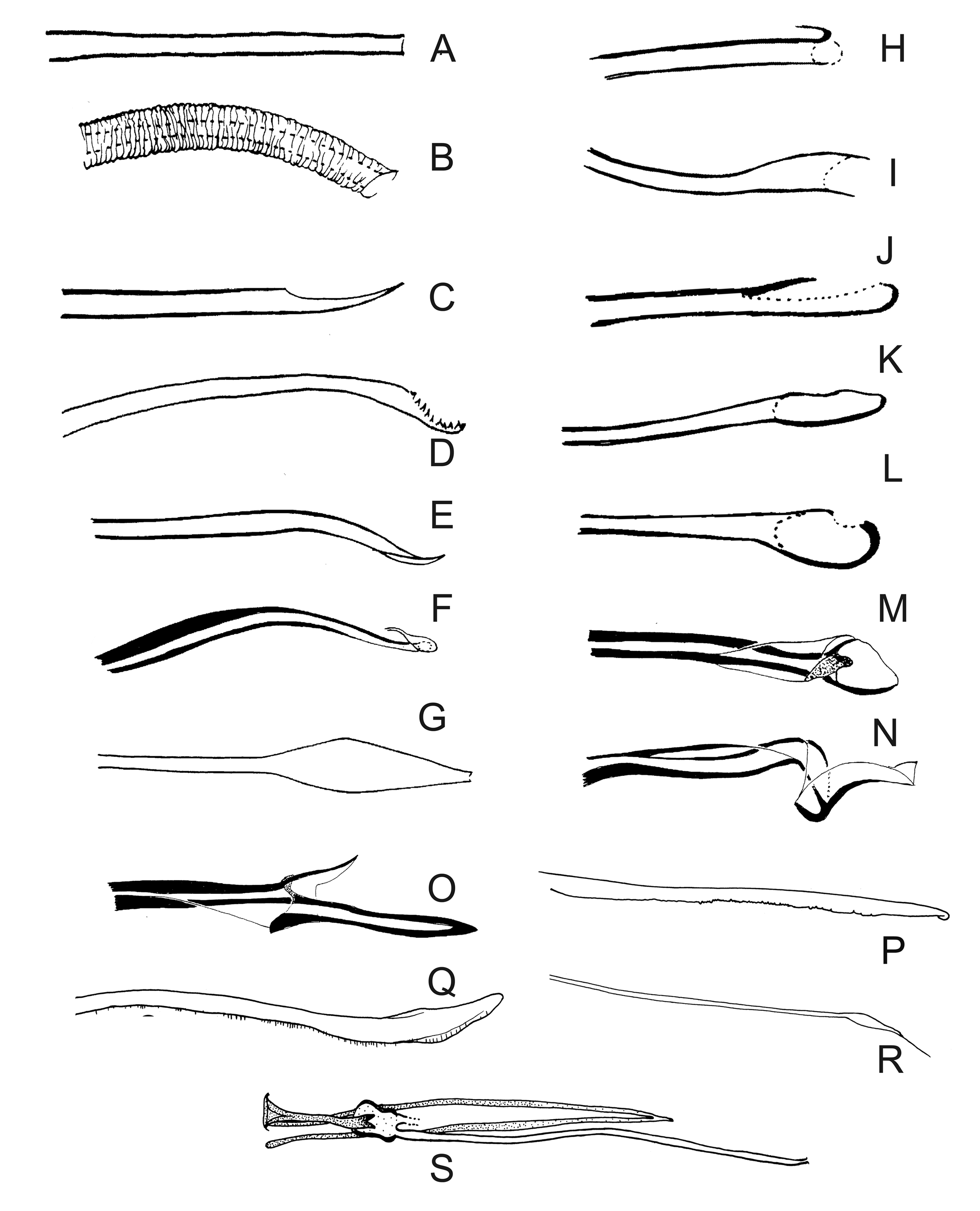
Genitalia

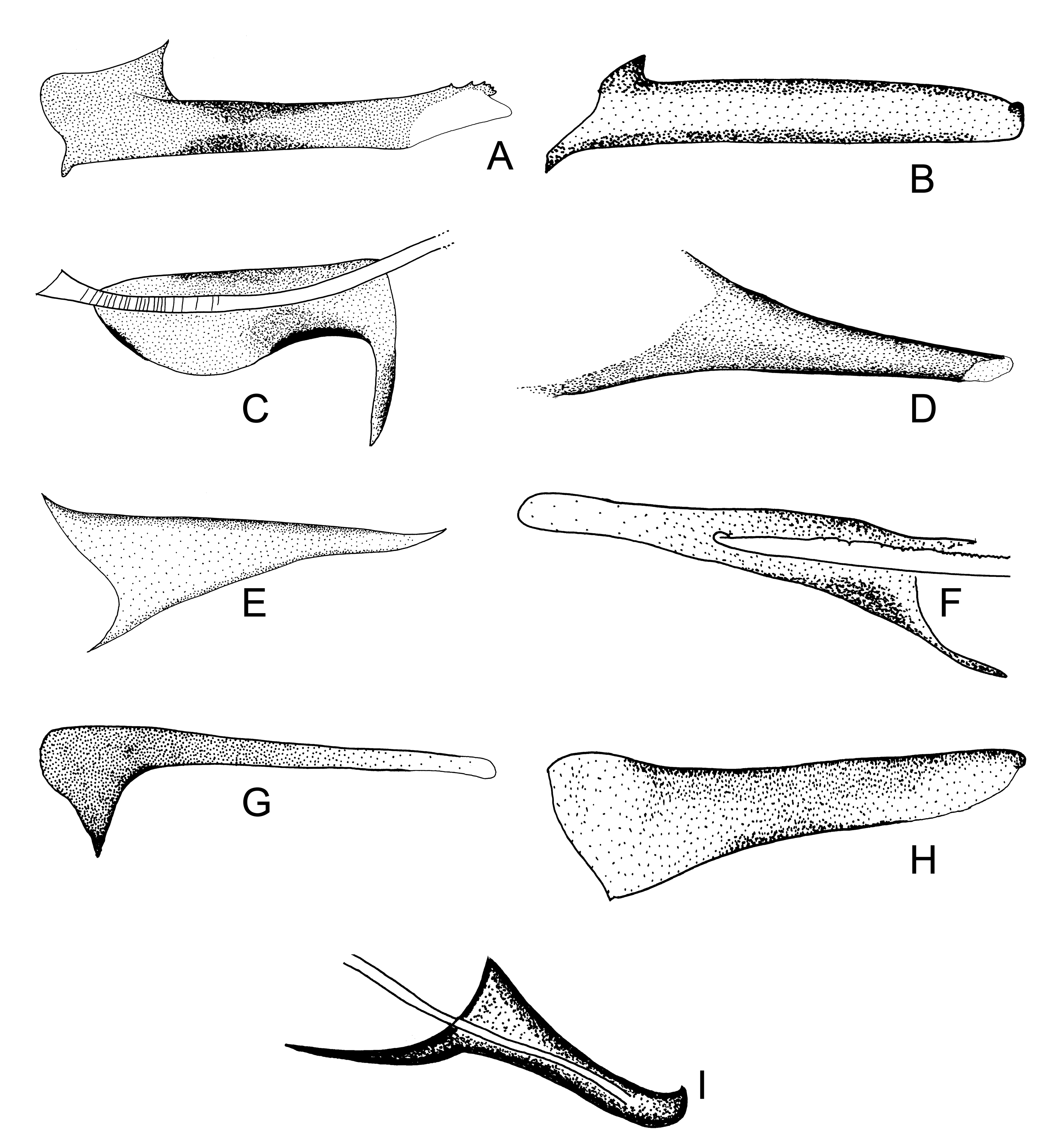
Genitalia

== See also ==
- Use of DNA in forensic entomology
