= Myrmecophagy =

Feeding on termites or ants

Adaptations for myrmecophagy in mammals, such as long tongues and strong digging forelimbs, have evolved convergently at least 12 times.

Myrmecophagy (from Ancient Greek μύρμηξ múrmēx, 'ant', and φαγεῖν phageîn, 'to eat') is a feeding behavior in animals, defined by the consumption of termites or ants—particularly as pertaining to those animal species whose diets are largely, or completely, composed of these insect types. Notable myrmecophages include the three genera of anteaters, aardvarks, numbats, echidnas, some armadillos, and pangolins, as well as some members of the order Carnivora such as the sloth bear of the Indian subcontinent and the aardwolf of Southern Africa.

The related habit of termite-eating is termitophagy; the two dietary habits often overlap, as these eusocial insects live in similarly large, densely populated ant colonies or termite mounds, requiring specialised adaptations from any species that wishes to access them. Physical traits of several myrmecophagous animals include long, sharp, often curved front claws for digging into nests or mounds.

== Vertebrates ==
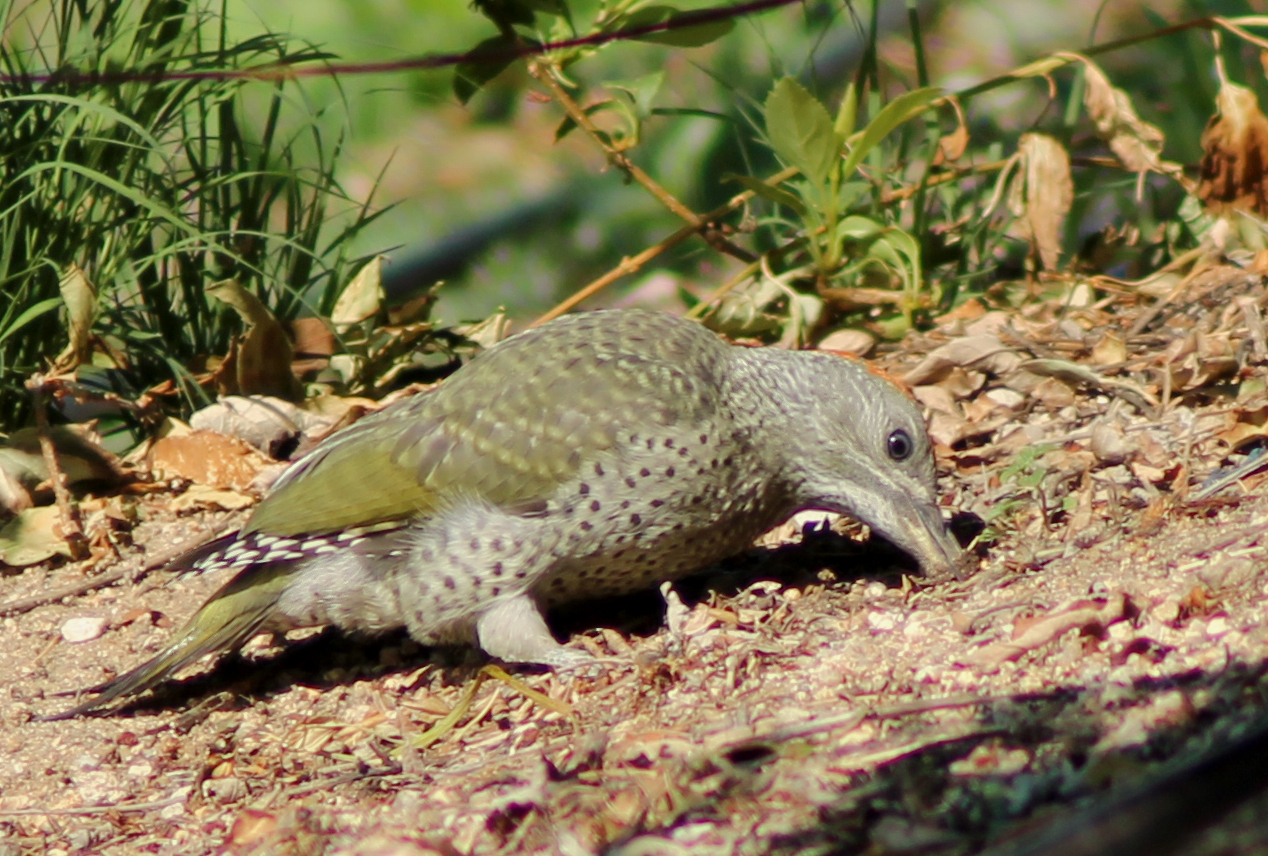
Juvenile Iberian green woodpecker eating ants

Myrmecophagy is found in several land-dwelling vertebrate taxa. Ant-eating reptiles include horned lizards. Amphibians include frogs such as Dendrobatidae and Hylidae, while toads such as Bufo frequently eat ants; many other amphibians take variable quantities of ants in their diet. Ant-eating birds include several species of woodpeckers and the New World flickers and the Neotropical antthrushes which prey on columns of foraging Ecitonini ants, while many other insectivorous birds occasionally eat ants. Mammals whose diets consist largely of ants and termites include monotremes such as echidnas, marsupials such as numbats, and placental mammals – anteaters, aardvarks, armadillos, pangolins, and aardwolves.

The extinct alvarezsaurids, a group of theropod dinosaurs from the Cretaceous period, have been interpreted as myrmecophagous, with their short, robustly built arms with a single claw being interpreted as being used to break into colonial insect nests.

Mammals that specialize in myrmecophagy often develop similar adaptations for this niche; many have powerful forelimbs and claws adapted to excavating the nests of ant or termite colonies from the earth, under bark, or deeper within wood. Most have reduced teeth and some have reduced jaws as well. Many have low basal body temperatures, an adaptation to the low energy content of ants and termites, and most have advanced olfaction to help them find prey.

In the nineteenth and early twentieth century, many zoologists saw these shared features as evidence of relatedness, and accordingly they classified anteating groups such as pangolins, aardvarks, anteaters and armadillos in a single mammalian order, the Edentata. It quickly became evident that such a classification was mistaken, meaning that the species within the supposed order do not form a natural group. The features have come instead to be seen as examples of convergent evolution, for example, by Frank Evers Beddard in 1902. As genome sequences for various former members of Edentata have been published, genetic evidence has confirmed that its members are taxonomically distant. Myrmecophagy in mammals has evolved independently (convergently) at least 12 times, driven by the increase in availability of ants and termites: the biomass of these prey is over 10 times that of all wild mammals combined.

Mammals with convergently evolved anteating features

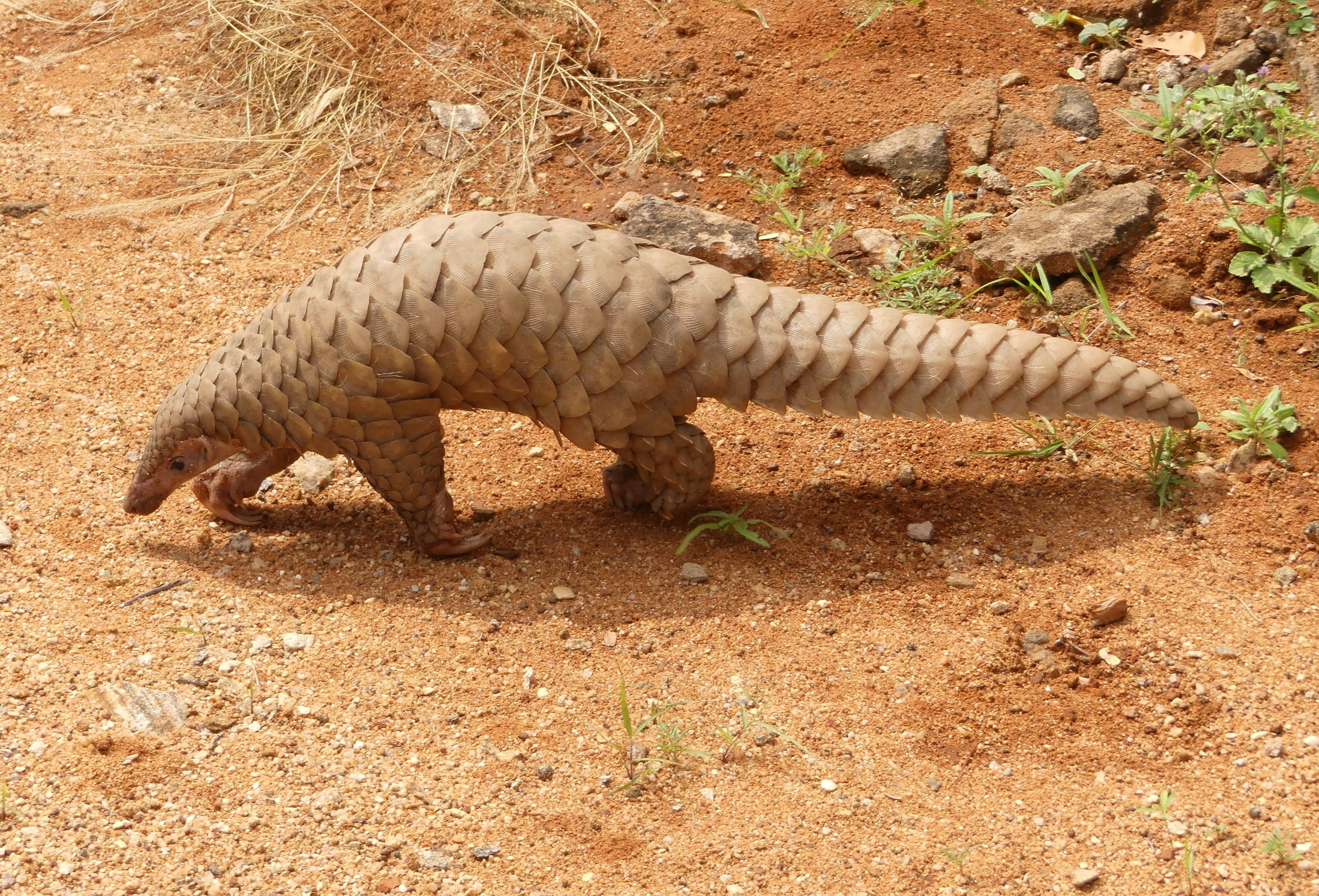
Pangolin

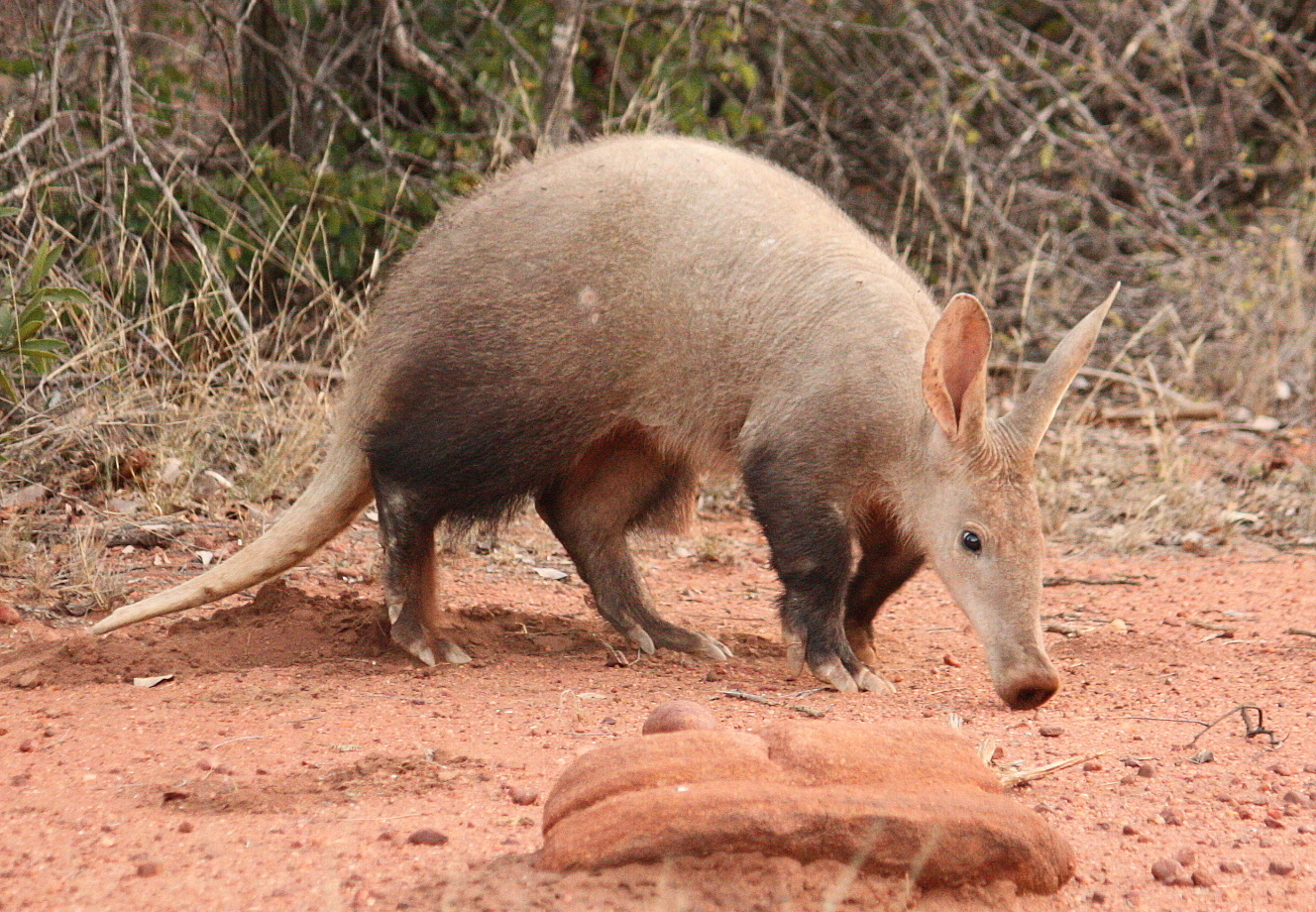
Aardvark

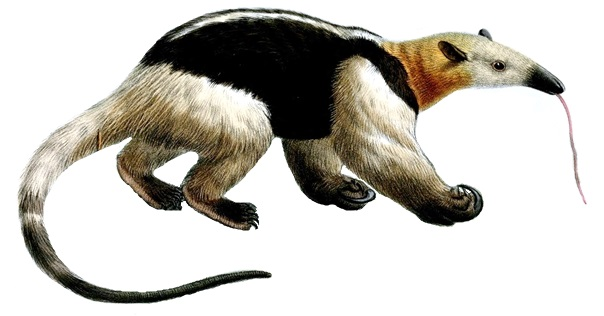
Anteater

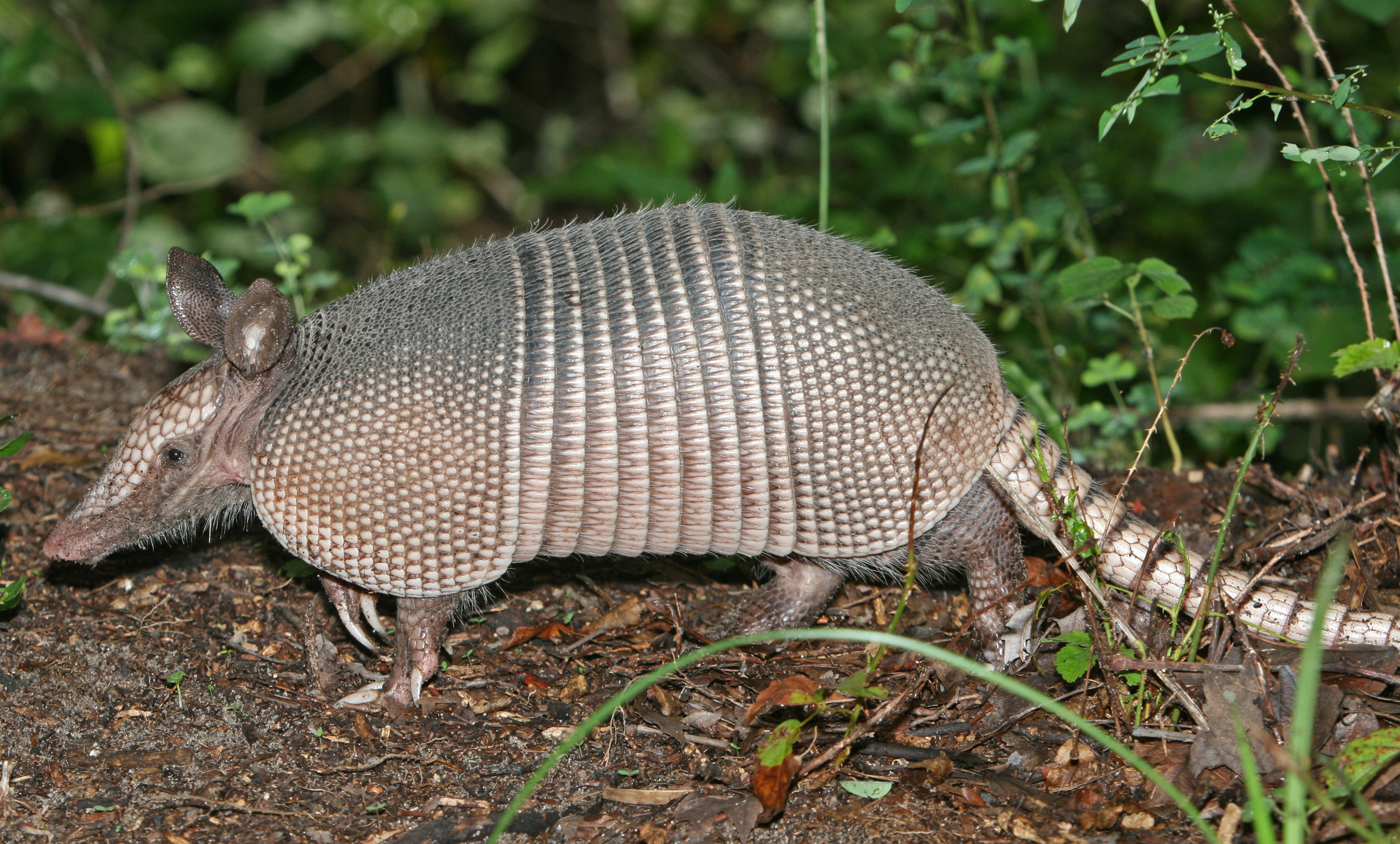
Armadillo

== Invertebrates ==
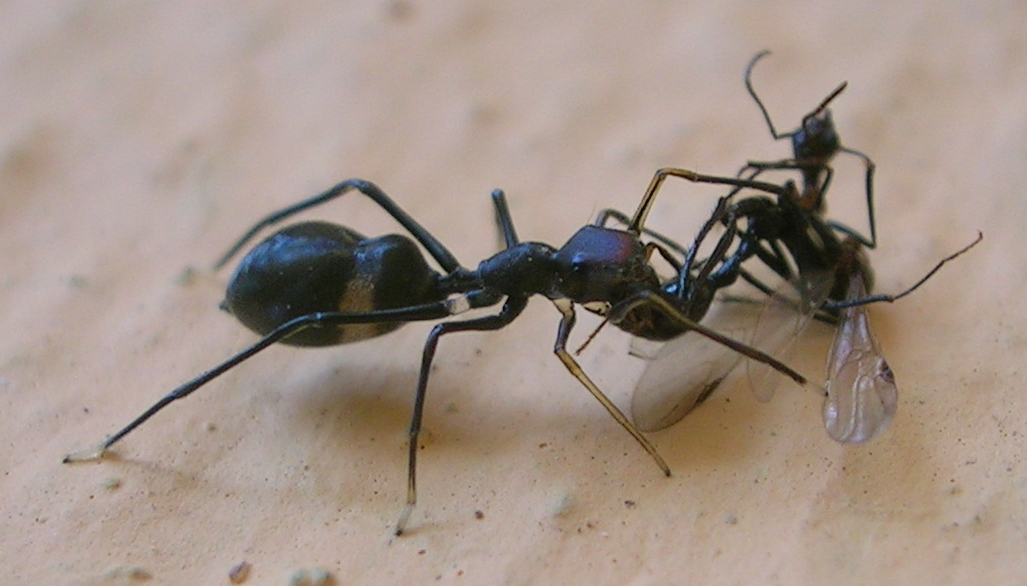
Myrmarachne spider eating an alate. The spider mimics the ant (Wasmannian mimicry) both to avoid predators (Batesian mimicry) and to deceive its ant prey (aggressive mimicry).

Ants are dangerous, being rich in distasteful and harmful compounds, which for other invertebrates makes them difficult prey, though ants are still widespread and plentiful, so members of several invertebrate taxa do feed on ants. Such ant predators include some spiders, such as species in the family Salticidae (jumping spiders), spiders in the family Oecobiidae and the family Theridiidae. While exclusive myrmecophagy (only eating ants) is not very common, there are some striking examples, such as the Australian ant-slayer spider Euryopis umbilicata that feeds almost exclusively on one species of ant. Their difficulty as prey promotes the prevalence of ant mimicry for defence; these are myrmecomorphs and myrmecophiles. Myrmecomorph myrmecophages are Batesian mimics, giving them protection against predators which avoid ants, and access to abundant food.

Various Hemipteran bugs, in the family Reduviidae feed largely or exclusively on ants. Examples include the genera Paredocla and Acanthaspis.

Some insects that feed on ants do so because they are opportunistic predators of small insects that run on the ground surface, of which ants are a large proportion. Remarkable examples of convergent evolution are certain species of the Neuropteran family Myrmeleontidae, largely Myrmeleon, the so-called ant lions, and the Dipteran family Vermileonidae, in particular the genera Lampromyia and Vermileo, the so-called worm lions. Both of them are regarded with interest for their habit of constructing conical pit traps in fine sand or dust, at the bottom of which they await prey that has fallen in. Both throw sand to interfere with any attempts on the part of the prey to escape.

Myrmecophagy takes more forms than just eating adult ants; in the butterfly family Lycaenidae, during the later instars of caterpillar development, these larvae enter the nests of particular species of ants, eating the ants' eggs and larvae. Larvae of some species of flies, such as the genus Microdon in the family Syrphidae spend their entire immature lives in the nests of ants, feeding largely or entirely on the ant brood. Some beetles specialise in feeding on the brood of particular species of ants. An example is the coccinellid Diomus; larvae of Diomus thoracicus in French Guiana specialise in the nests of the invasive ant species Wasmannia auropunctata.

Major predators of ants include other ants, especially the army ants and their close relatives. Some ants such as the raider ant Ooceraea biroi and the new world army ant Nomamyrmex esenbecki are obligate myrmecophages, that is they exclusively eat other ants, while the swarm-raiding Eciton burchellii eat more or less all arthropods in their paths, including other ants (they are generalists). Primarily it is the pupae and larvae, rather than adult ants, that are eaten. The ant species Megaponera analis is monophagous and feeds exclusively on termites.

== Sources ==
- Bequaert, Joseph (1922). "III. The Predaceous Enemies of Ants". Bulletin of the American Museum of Natural History. 65: 271–331.
