= Namaquamyia =

Scientific classification
- Kingdom: Animalia
- Phylum: Arthropoda
- Class: Insecta
- Order: Diptera
- Family: Vermileonidae
- Genus: Namaquamyia; Stuckenberg, 2002
- Species: N. manselli

Binomial name
- Namaquamyia manselli (Stuckenberg, 2000)

Synonyms
- Namamyia Stuckenberg, 2000 (preoccupied); Namaqualandia Koçak & Kemal, 2008

Monotypic genus of flies

Namaquamyia is a genus of wormlion in the family Vermileonidae, containing a single species from Namaqualand, Namaquamyia manselli. The genus was first described by Brian Roy Stuckenberg in 2000, who originally named it Namamyia (after the Nama people); this name was preoccupied by the caddisfly genus Namamyia Banks, 1905, so in 2002 Stuckenberg renamed the genus Namaqualandia (after Namaqualand).
