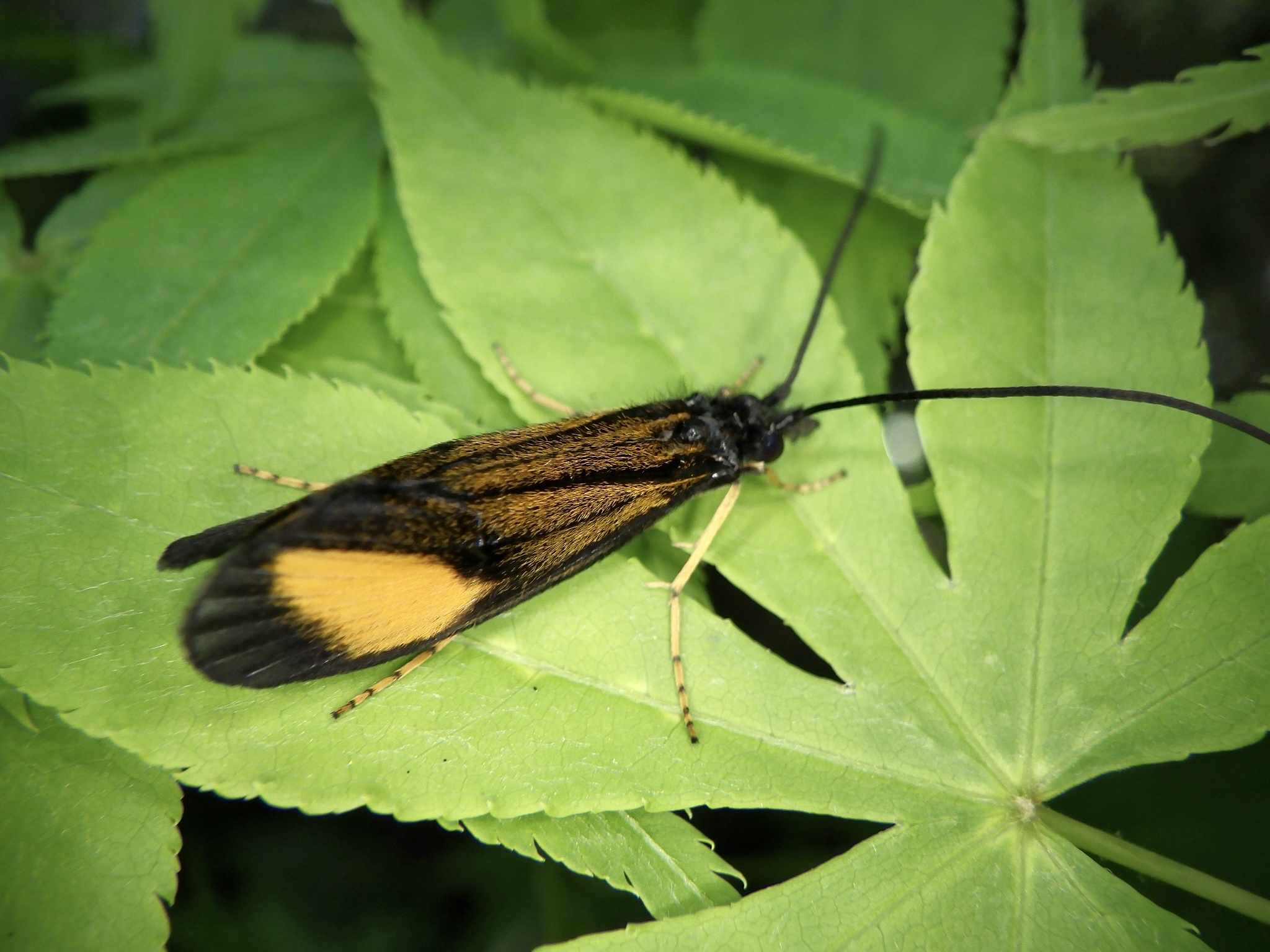

Scientific classification
- Kingdom: Animalia
- Phylum: Arthropoda
- Clade: Pancrustacea
- Class: Insecta
- Order: Trichoptera
- Family: Odontoceridae
- Genus: Perissoneura
- Species: P. paradoxa

Binomial name
- Perissoneura paradoxa McLachlan, 1871

= Perissoneura paradoxa =

Species of caddisfly

Perissoneura paradoxa is a species of caddisfly in the genus Perissoneura of the family Odontoceridae.
