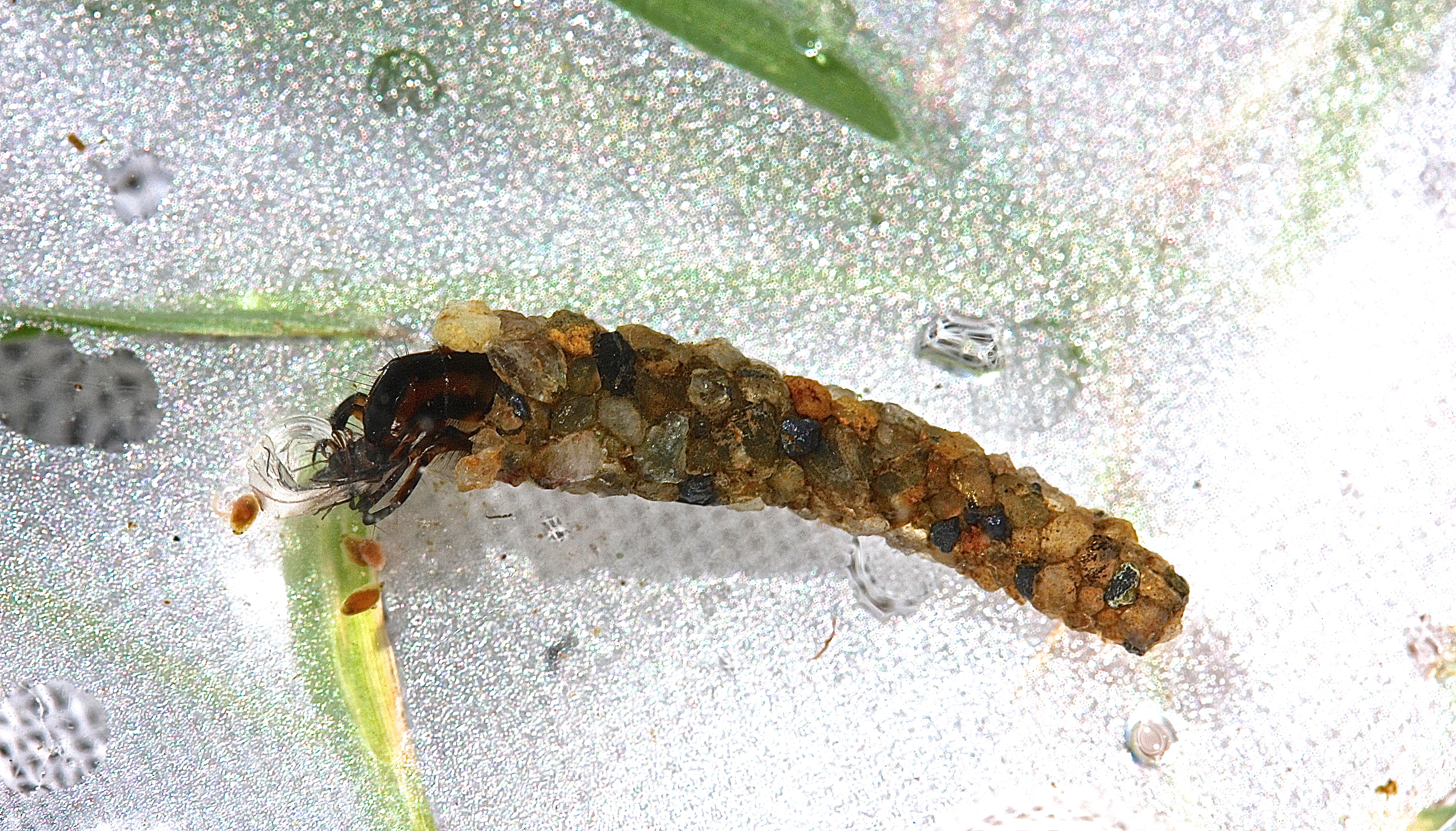

Scientific classification
- Domain: Eukaryota
- Kingdom: Animalia
- Phylum: Arthropoda
- Class: Insecta
- Order: Trichoptera
- Family: Odontoceridae
- Genus: Psilotreta
- Species: P. labida

Binomial name
- Psilotreta labida Ross, 1944

= Psilotreta labida =

Species of caddisfly

Psilotreta labida is a species of mortarjoint casemaker in the family Odontoceridae. It is found in North America.
