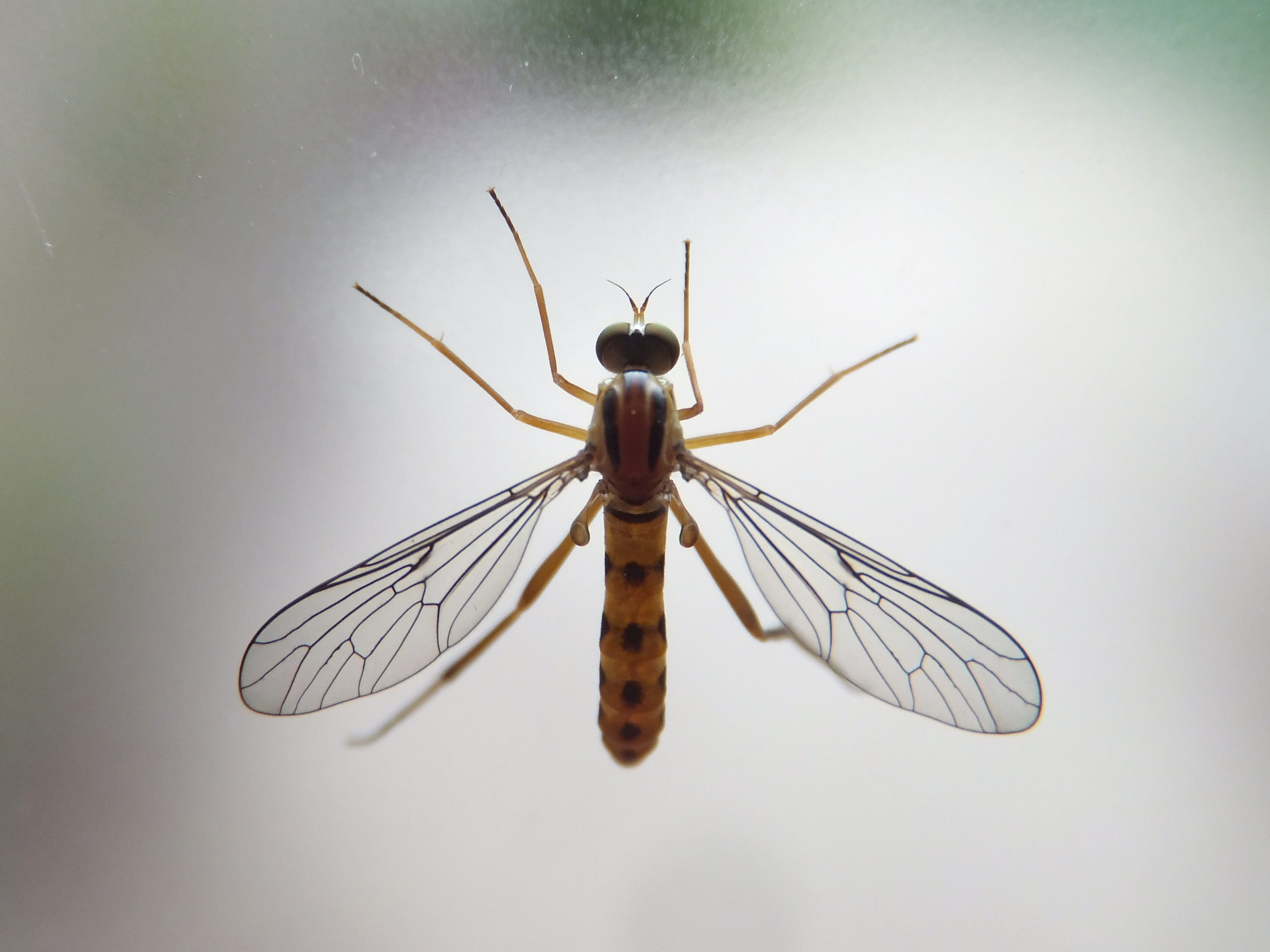
- Vermileo vermileo

Scientific classification
- Kingdom: Animalia
- Phylum: Arthropoda
- Class: Insecta
- Order: Diptera
- Family: Vermileonidae
- Genus: Vermileo
- Species: V. vermileo

Binomial name
- Vermileo vermileo (Linnaeus, 1758)

Synonyms
- Musca vermileo Linnaeus, 1758; Vermileo balearicus Wheeler, 1930

= Vermileo vermileo =

Species of fly

Vermileo vermileo is a species of wormlion in the family Vermileonidae.
