= Vermileo opacus =

Scientific classification
- Kingdom: Animalia
- Phylum: Arthropoda
- Class: Insecta
- Order: Diptera
- Family: Vermileonidae
- Genus: Vermileo
- Species: V. opacus

Binomial name
- Vermileo opacus (Coquillett, 1904)

Synonyms
- Pheneus opacus Coquillett, 1904

Species of fly

Vermileo opacus is a species of wormlion in the family Vermileonidae.
