= Vermileo comstocki =

Scientific classification
- Kingdom: Animalia
- Phylum: Arthropoda
- Class: Insecta
- Order: Diptera
- Family: Vermileonidae
- Genus: Vermileo
- Species: V. comstocki

Binomial name
- Vermileo comstocki Wheeler, 1918

Species of fly

Vermileo comstocki, the sierra wormlion, is a species of wormlion in the family Vermileonidae.
