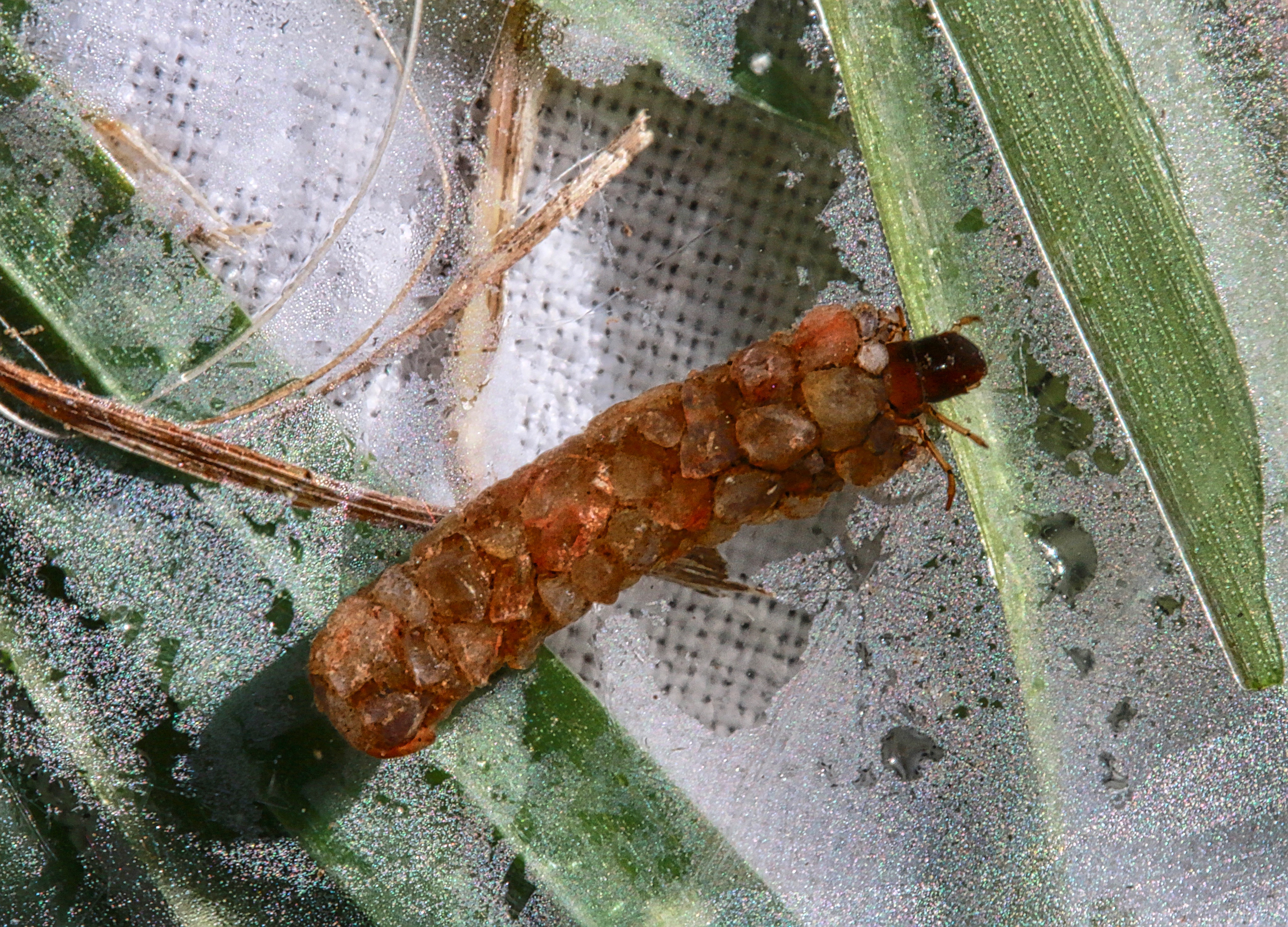

Scientific classification
- Domain: Eukaryota
- Kingdom: Animalia
- Phylum: Arthropoda
- Class: Insecta
- Order: Trichoptera
- Family: Odontoceridae
- Genus: Psilotreta
- Species: P. rufa

Binomial name
- Psilotreta rufa (Hagen, 1861)

Synonyms
- Astroplectron connexa Banks, 1914; Molanna rufa Hagen, 1861; Psilotreta connexa (Banks, 1914); Psilotreta dissimilis (Banks, 1897)

= Psilotreta rufa =

Species of caddisfly

Psilotreta rufa is a species of mortarjoint casemaker in the family Odontoceridae. It is found in North America.
