= Isalomyia =

Scientific classification
- Kingdom: Animalia
- Phylum: Arthropoda
- Class: Insecta
- Order: Diptera
- Family: Vermileonidae
- Genus: Isalomyia; Stuckenberg, 2002
- Species: I. irwini

Binomial name
- Isalomyia irwini Stuckenberg, 2002

Genus of flies

Isalomyia is a genus of wormlion in the family Vermileonidae. It contains a single species Isalomyia irwini, endemic to Madagascar. It is closedly related to Alhajarmyia, a genus from the Arabian Peninsula and East Africa.
