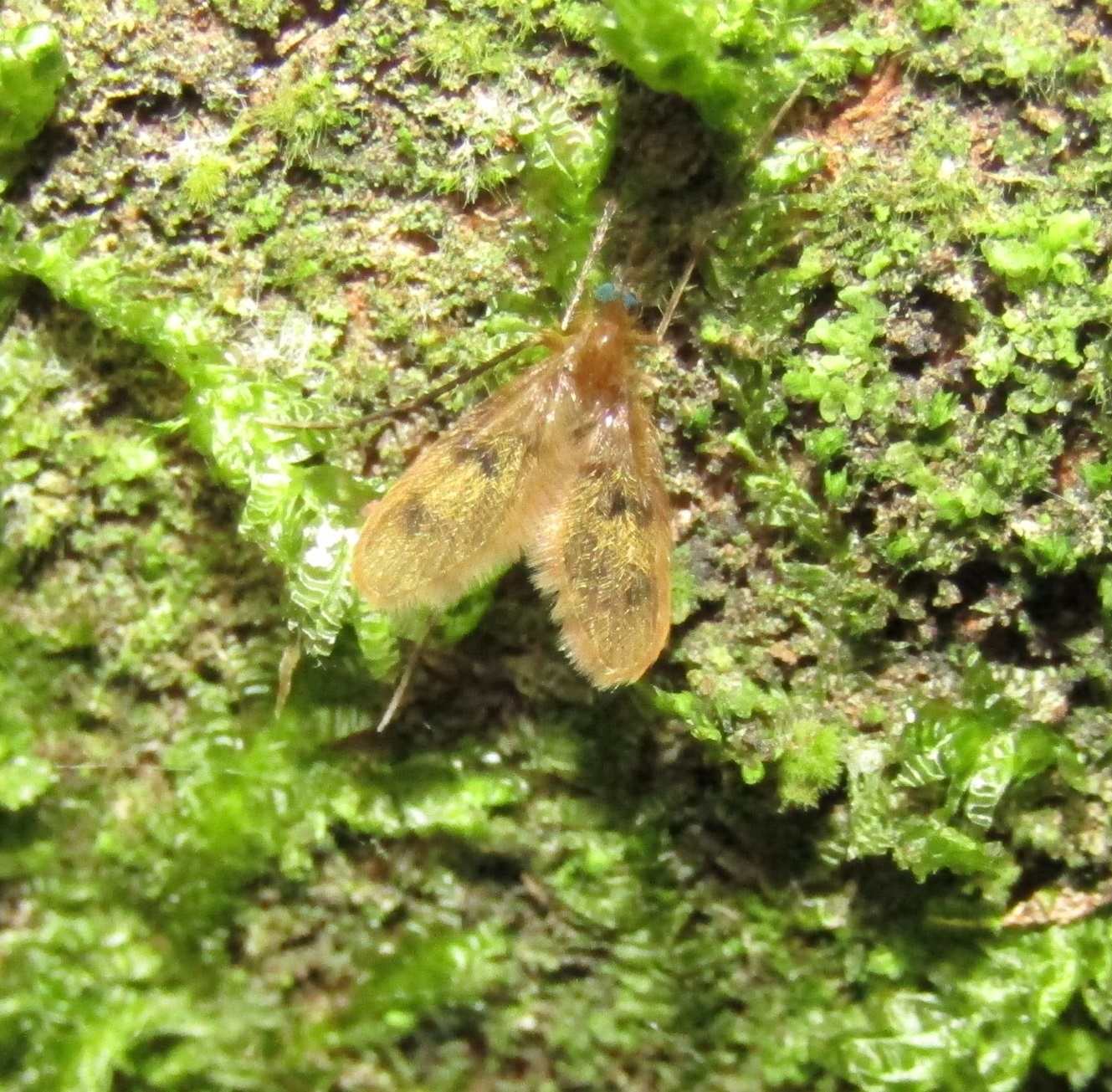
- Notofairchildia zelandiae

Scientific classification
- Kingdom: Animalia
- Phylum: Arthropoda
- Class: Insecta
- Order: Diptera
- Superfamily: Psychodoidea
- Family: Psychodidae
- Subfamily: Bruchomyiinae
- Genus: Notofairchildia; Wagner & Stuckenberg, 2016

Type species
- Nemopalpus stuckenbergi Wagner, 2012

= Notofairchildia =

Genus of flies

Notofairchildia is a genus of moth flies in the subfamily Bruchomyiinae. Species have been recorded principally from South America, with many, including the type, transferred from the genus Nemopalpus.

== Species ==
Unless referenced otherwise, Systema Dipterorum includes:

- Notofairchildia acaenohybos (Quate & Alexander, 2000)
- Notofairchildia amazonensis (Wagner & Stuckenberg, 2012)
- Notofairchildia australiensis (Alexander, 1928)
- Notofairchildia brejetubensis (Santos, 2009)
- Notofairchildia brevinervis (Barretto & Andretta, 1946)
- Notofairchildia cancer (Wagner & Stuckenberg, 2012)
- Notofairchildia dissimilis (Barretto & Andretta, 1946)
- Notofairchildia espiritosantoensis (Santos, 2009)
- Notofairchildia glyphanos (Curler, 2012)
- Notofairchildia immaculatus (Freeman, 1949)
- Notofairchildia phoenimimos (Quate & Alexander, 2000)
- Notofairchildia rondanica (Quate & Alexander, 2000)
- Notofairchildia spinosus (Bravo & Barata, 2012)
- Notofairchildia stenygros (Quate & Alexander, 2000)
- Notofairchildia stuckenbergi (Wagner, 2012)
- Notofairchildia zelandiae (Alexander, 1921)
