= Nemopalpus =

- Nemopalpus wing veins

Scientific classification
- Kingdom: Animalia
- Phylum: Arthropoda
- Class: Insecta
- Order: Diptera
- Family: Psychodidae
- Subfamily: Bruchomyiinae
- Genus: Nemopalpus; Macquart, 1838

Type species
- Nemopalpus flavus Macquart, 1838

Synonyms
- Nemapalpus Macquart, 1838; Nygmatodes Loew, 1845

Genus of flies

Nemopalpus is a genus of moth fly in the family Psychodidae, in the subfamily Bruchomyiinae. Recently (2018) a number of similar species have been transferred to the genera: Alexanderia, Boreofairchildia, Laurenceomyia and Notofairchildia. In Macquart's original publication, the genus name was spelled both as Nemopalpus and Nemapalpus, but Macquart corrected the error in 1839.

== Species ==
- Nemopalpus capensis (Edwards, 1929)
- Nemopalpus concolor Stuckenberg, 1962
- Nemopalpus davidsoni Stuckenberg, 1978
- Nemopalpus flavus Macquart, 1838
- Nemopalpus hennigianus Schlüter, 1978
- Nemopalpus inexpectatus Wagner, 2012
- Nemopalpus ledgeri (Stuckenberg, 1978)
- Nemopalpus molophilinus (Edwards, 1921)
- Nemopalpus tertiariae (Meunier, 1905)
- Nemopalpus transvaalensis Stuckenberg, 1962
