= Vermilynx =

Scientific classification
- Kingdom: Animalia
- Phylum: Arthropoda
- Class: Insecta
- Order: Diptera
- Family: Vermileonidae
- Genus: Vermilynx; Stuckenberg, 1995

Type species
- Lampromyia vansoni Stuckenberg, 1965

Genus of flies

Vermilynx is a genus of wormlion in the family Vermileonidae.

== Species ==
- Vermilynx jasoni Stuckenberg, 1996
- Vermilynx vansoni (Stuckenberg, 1965)
