= Marilia flexuosa =

Scientific classification
- Kingdom: Animalia
- Phylum: Arthropoda
- Class: Insecta
- Order: Trichoptera
- Family: Odontoceridae
- Genus: Marilia
- Species: M. flexuosa

Binomial name
- Marilia flexuosa Ulmer, 1905

Species of caddisfly

Marilia flexuosa is a species of mortarjoint casemaker in the family Odontoceridae. It is found in North America.
