= Psilotreta indecisa =

Scientific classification
- Domain: Eukaryota
- Kingdom: Animalia
- Phylum: Arthropoda
- Class: Insecta
- Order: Trichoptera
- Family: Odontoceridae
- Genus: Psilotreta
- Species: P. indecisa

Binomial name
- Psilotreta indecisa (Walker, 1852)

Synonyms
- Goera indecisa Walker, 1852; Heteroplectron borealis Provancher, 1877; Psilotreta borealis (Provancher, 1877)

Species of caddisfly

Psilotreta indecisa is a species of mortarjoint casemaker in the family Odontoceridae. It is found in North America.
