= Alhajarmyia =

Scientific classification
- Kingdom: Animalia
- Phylum: Arthropoda
- Class: Insecta
- Order: Diptera
- Family: Vermileonidae
- Genus: Alhajarmyia; Stuckenberg, 2003

Type species
- Lampromyia umbraticola Stuckenberg & Fisher, 1999

Genus of flies

Alhajarmyia is a genus of wormlion in the family Vermileonidae. It consists of two species from the Arabian Peninsula and East Africa. It is closely related to the Malagasy endemic Isalomyia.

== Species ==
- Alhajarmyia umbraticola (Stuckenberg & Fisher, 1999) – Oman: Hajar Mountains
- Alhajarmyia stuckenbergi Swart, Kirk-Spriggs & Copeland, 2015 – Kenya: Eastern Arc Mountains
