= Boreofairchildia nearctica =

Conservation status
- Endangered (IUCN 2.3)

Scientific classification
- Domain: Eukaryota
- Kingdom: Animalia
- Phylum: Arthropoda
- Class: Insecta
- Order: Diptera
- Family: Psychodidae
- Subfamily: Bruchomyiinae
- Genus: Boreofairchildia
- Species: B. nearctica

Binomial name
- Boreofairchildia nearctica (Young, 1974)

Synonyms
- Nemopalpus nearcticus Young, 1974

Species of fly

Boreofairchildia nearctica (synonym Nemopalpus nearcticus, with the genus sometimes spelled Nemapalpus), the sugarfoot moth-fly, is a species of nematoceran flies in the family Psychodidae. It is endemic to the United States.

The IUCN conservation status of Nemopalpus nearcticus is "EN", endangered. The species faces a high risk of extinction in the near future.
