= Perissoneura chrysea =

Scientific classification
- Kingdom: Animalia
- Phylum: Arthropoda
- Clade: Pancrustacea
- Class: Insecta
- Order: Trichoptera
- Family: Odontoceridae
- Genus: Perissoneura
- Species: P. chrysea

Binomial name
- Perissoneura chrysea Navas, 1922

Species of caddisfly

Perissoneura chrysea is a species of caddisfly in the genus Perissoneura of the family Odontoceridae.
