= Psilotreta frontalis =

Scientific classification
- Domain: Eukaryota
- Kingdom: Animalia
- Phylum: Arthropoda
- Class: Insecta
- Order: Trichoptera
- Family: Odontoceridae
- Genus: Psilotreta
- Species: P. frontalis

Binomial name
- Psilotreta frontalis Banks, 1899

Synonyms
- Psilotreta gameta (Ross, 1939); Psilotreta hansoni Denning, 1948

Species of caddisfly

Psilotreta frontalis is a species of mortarjoint casemaker in the family Odontoceridae. It is found in North America.
