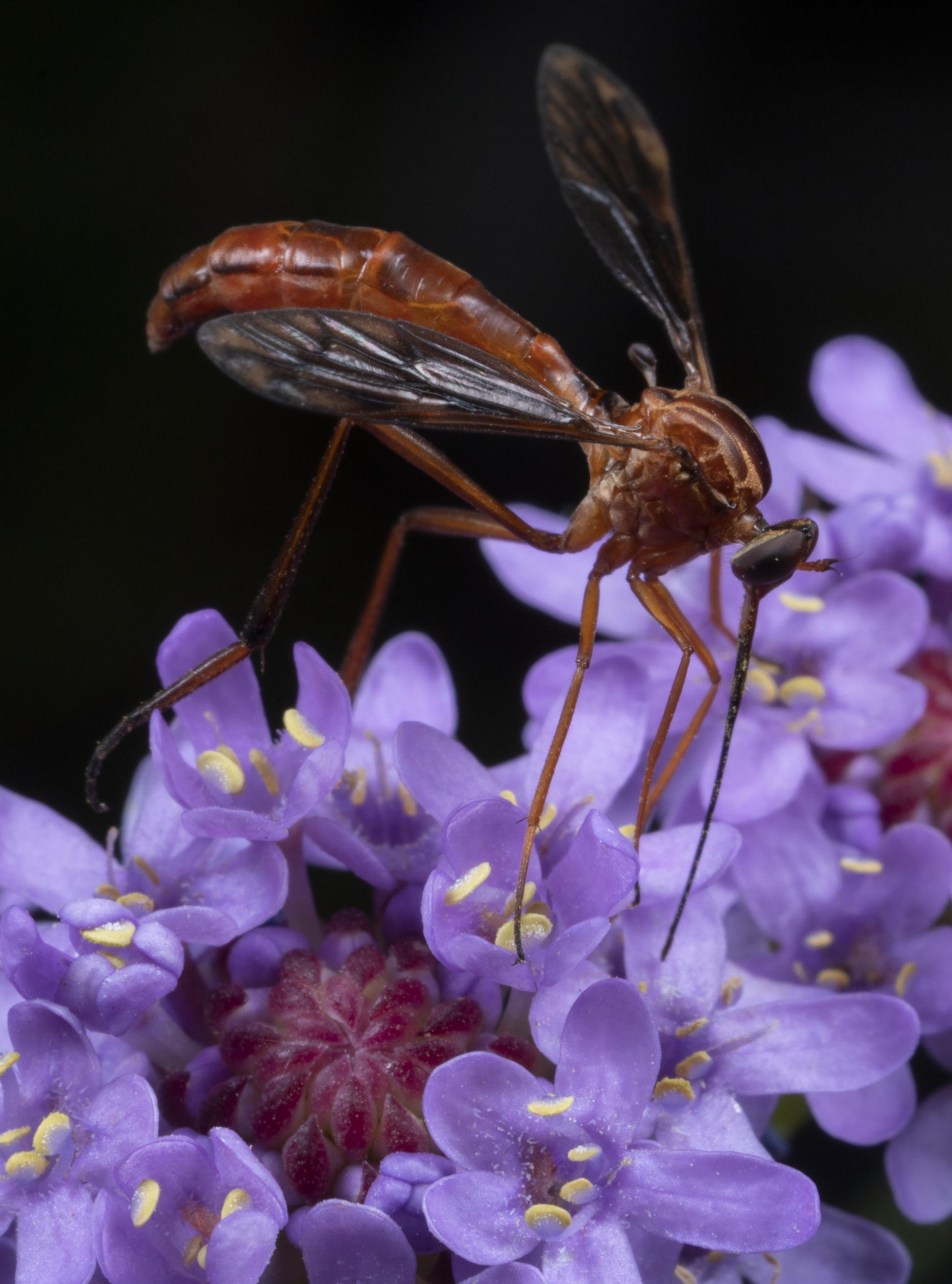
- Leptynoma sericea

Scientific classification
- Kingdom: Animalia
- Phylum: Arthropoda
- Class: Insecta
- Order: Diptera
- Family: Vermileonidae
- Genus: Leptynoma; Westwood, 1876

Type species
- Leptynoma sericea Westwood, 1876

= Leptynoma =

Genus of flies

Leptynoma is a genus of wormlions in the family Vermileonidae.

== Species ==
- Leptynoma appendiculata (Bezzi, 1926)
- Leptynoma hessei (Stuckenberg, 1961)
- Leptynoma kirkspriggsi Stuckenberg, 1998
- Leptynoma namaquaensis (Stuckenberg, 1960)
- Leptynoma sericea Westwood, 1876

Species transferred to Perianthomyia (formerly a subgenus of Leptynoma):

- Leptynoma maculata (Stuckenberg, 1961)
- Leptynoma monticola Stuckenberg, 2000
- Leptynoma phantasma Stuckenberg, 1996
