= Vermitigris =

Scientific classification
- Kingdom: Animalia
- Phylum: Arthropoda
- Class: Insecta
- Order: Diptera
- Family: Vermileonidae
- Genus: Vermitigris; Wheeler, 1930

Type species
- Vermitigris fairchildi Wheeler, 1930

Species
- Vermitigris fairchildi; Vermitigris infasciatus; Vermitigris orientalis; Vermitigris sinensis; Vermitigris tsangyanggyatso

Diversity
- 5 species

Genus of flies

Vermitigris is a genus of Brachyceran fly that belongs to the family Vermileonidae (wormlions). They can be found in China, India, Indonesia, and Malaysia. Their larva have the characteristic behavior of building pitfall traps in loose substrates to capture prey.

== Distribution ==
Members of this genus inhabit the Asian continent being found distributed in China and India and across the region of southeastern Asia in countries such as Indonesia, and Malaysia.

== Behavior ==
Like many members of Vermileonidae, larva of the is genus will construct pitfall traps. They use these traps to employ a pitfall-feeding strategy that is similar to strategies used by the larval stages of antlions. Their pitfall building behavior is a characteristic behavior for Vermeonids with them being the only known family within diptera whose larvae capture their prey by building pitfall traps in loose substrates.

== Taxonomy ==
This genus is a fly being a part of the order Diptera. It is specifically a Brachyceran fly within the family Vermileonidae, also known as wormlions. There are currently about 13 members of this family with two extinct genera (Protovermileo and Crevermileo). This genus is probably a basal member of the family along with Crevermileo. Evidence for this can be seen with their short mouthparts and fleshy labella.

=== Species ===
This genus currently contains five described species. A list can be found below:

- Vermitigris fairchildi Wheeler, 1930
- Vermitigris infasciatus Oldroyd, 1947
- Vermitigris orientalis (Brunetti, 1927)
- Vermitigris sinensis Yang, 1988
- Vermitigris tsangyanggyatso Shan & Wang, 2026
