= Gregg Yan =

Gregg Yan is a prominent Filipino explorer, environmentalist and author who founded NGO Best Alternatives, a group that promotes ecologically sound alternatives to global ecological problems. He made history in October 2026 as the first Filipino inducted as a Fellow of The Explorers Club, breaking a century-old barrier for Philippine representation in the prestigious global exploration scene. Other members of The Explorers Club include astronauts Neil Armstrong and Buzz Aldrin, oceanographer Jacques Cousteau and conservationist Jane Goodall.

A well-known Filipino author with dozens of book credits, Yan is also a noted wildlife photographer, having photographed many of the world's most iconic and endangered species including lions, elephants, crocodiles, the Red-footed Booby, Philippine Tamaraw and the Philippine Pangolin. Yan's wildlife photographs have been used by books and museums worldwide.

He is a frequent guest on Philippine and international television shows, typically speaking about environmental issues affecting the Philippines or the greater Southeast Asian region.

Yan was recognized by Reader's Digest as one of the most trusted people in the Philippines and was awarded by Asia Pacific Business Insider as the top advocacy communicator for the Asia Pacific Region in 2016.

He is also the first Filipino explorer to have been branded as a ‘Moran’ or warrior of the Maasai tribe in East Africa.
