= Laurenceomyia =

Scientific classification
- Kingdom: Animalia
- Phylum: Arthropoda
- Class: Insecta
- Order: Diptera
- Superfamily: Psychodoidea
- Family: Psychodidae
- Subfamily: Bruchomyiinae
- Genus: Laurenceomyia; Wagner & Stuckenberg, 2016

Type species
- Nemopalpus dampfianus Alexander, 1940

Genus of flies

Laurenceomyia is a genus of moth flies in the subfamily Bruchomyiinae. Species have been recorded principally from south America, with many, including the type, transferred from the genus Nemopalpus.

== Description ==
The genus Laurenceomyia was dedicated to Lawrence W. Quate for his studies on Psychodidae. "According to cladistics analysis, the diagnostic characters of this genus are: aedeagus about as long as ejaculatory apodeme and gonocoxites with [a mid] projection near apex; gonostyli elongate, straight along most of their length, subapically strongly bent with blunt apex."

== Species ==
- Laurenceomyia capixaba (Santos, 2009)
- Laurenceomyia dampfianus (Alexander, 1940)
- Laurenceomyia pallipes (Shannon & Del Ponte, 1927)
- Laurenceomyia peixotoi Santos, Brazil & Pinto, 2021
- Laurenceomyia pilipes (Tonnoir, 1922)
- Laurenceomyia similis (Wagner & Stuckenberg, 2012)
