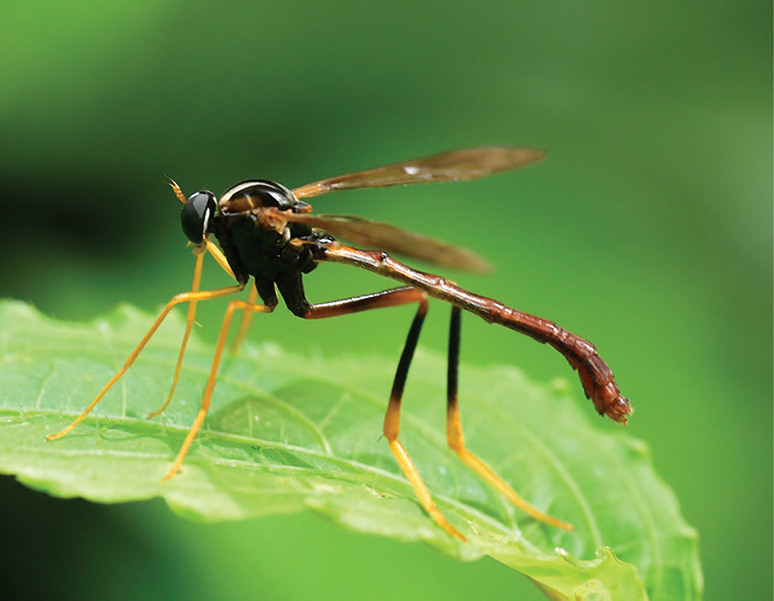
- Male resting on a leaf

Scientific classification
- Kingdom: Animalia
- Phylum: Arthropoda
- Clade: Pancrustacea
- Class: Insecta
- Order: Diptera
- Family: Vermileonidae
- Genus: Vermitigris
- Species: V. tsangyanggyatso

Binomial name
- Vermitigris tsangyanggyatso Shan & Wang, 2026

= Vermitigris tsangyanggyatso =

Species of brachyceran fly

Vermitigris tsangyanggyatso is a species of brachyceran fly that belongs to the family Vermileonidae. It is native to Xizang, China.

== Description ==
Males grew to a length of 18-19 mm and a width of 4-4.2 mm. They have a wingspan of 14.5–15.3 mm. Females grew to a length of 18.2–19.5 mm with a width of 4.1–4.5 mm. They have a wingspan of 15.0–15.8 mm. Their antennae are yellowish brown. Their hind femurs are mostly a reddish brown with their hind tibia being mostly dark brown and reddish brown. They lack any strips on their abdomens.

=== Immature stages ===
Their larvae can grow to a body length between 20–28 mm while pupae, excluding larval exuviae, can grow to a body length of 15–16 mm. The larva of this species possesses marginal spines on the proleg. These spines are approximately as long as or slightly shorter than the ones in the middle.

== Discovery ==
The holotype specimen (CNVer25TYG001) was a male collected in the Xizang Tibetan Autonomous Region, Yadong County, China. It was specifically collected at 27°13'54.99"N, 89°0'59.90"E which is located off the western bank of Yadong river. Also the collected were numerous paratypes of both sexes in the Tibetan Autonomous Region, Dinggyê County on the northern bank of Ganma Tsangpo. No eggs were obtained.

=== Etymology ===
The specific name is in reference to Tsangyang Gyatso. He is a Tibetan poet-monk who is known for his romantic verses and unconventional life.
