= Vermipardus =

Scientific classification
- Kingdom: Animalia
- Phylum: Arthropoda
- Class: Insecta
- Order: Diptera
- Family: Vermileonidae
- Genus: Vermipardus; Stuckenberg, 1961

Type species
- Lampromyia intermedia Stuckenberg, 1961

Genus of flies

Vermipardus is a genus of wormlions in the family Vermileonidae.

== Species ==
- Vermipardus barracloughi Stuckenberg, 1997
- Vermipardus basuto (Stuckenberg, 1961)
- Vermipardus brevirostris (Bezzi, 1926)
- Vermipardus brincki (Stuckenberg, 1961)
- Vermipardus intermedius (Stuckenberg, 1961)
- Vermipardus londti Stuckenberg, 1995
- Vermipardus munroi Stuckenberg, 1995
- Vermipardus promontorii (Stuckenberg, 1961)
- Vermipardus sathon Stuckenberg, 1995
- Vermipardus sylphe Stuckenberg, 1995
- Vermipardus trisignatus Stuckenberg, 1997
- Vermipardus univittatus (Stuckenberg, 1961)
- Vermipardus whiteheadi Stuckenberg, 1997
