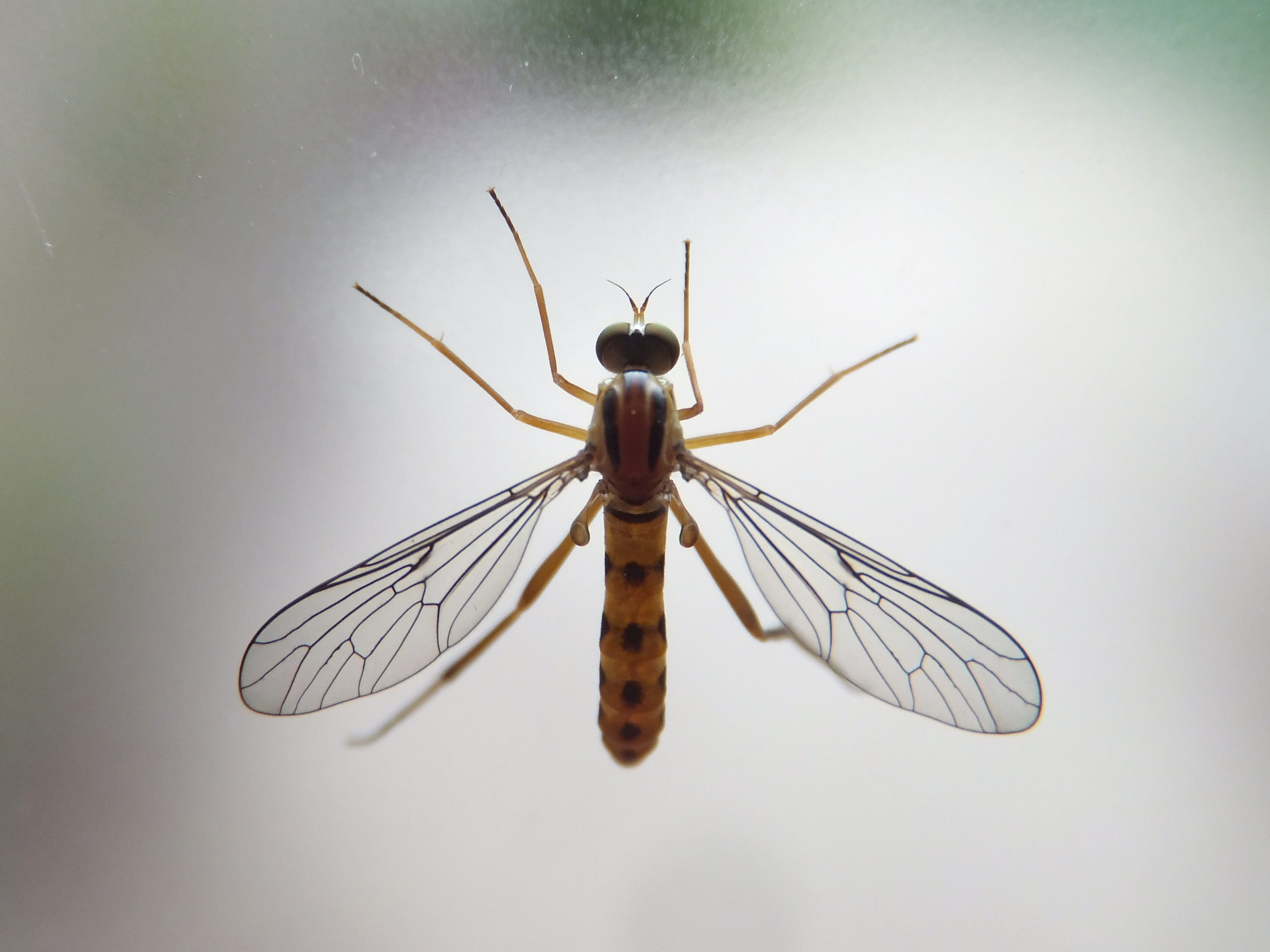
- Vermileo vermileo

Scientific classification
- Kingdom: Animalia
- Phylum: Arthropoda
- Clade: Pancrustacea
- Class: Insecta
- Order: Diptera
- Family: Vermileonidae
- Genus: Vermileo; Macquart, 1834

Synonyms
- Psammorycter Blanchard, 1840; Pheneus Walker, 1851; Apogon Perris, 1852; Arthrostylum Williston, 1895

= Vermileo =

Genus of flies

Vermileo is a genus of wormlions in the family Vermileonidae.

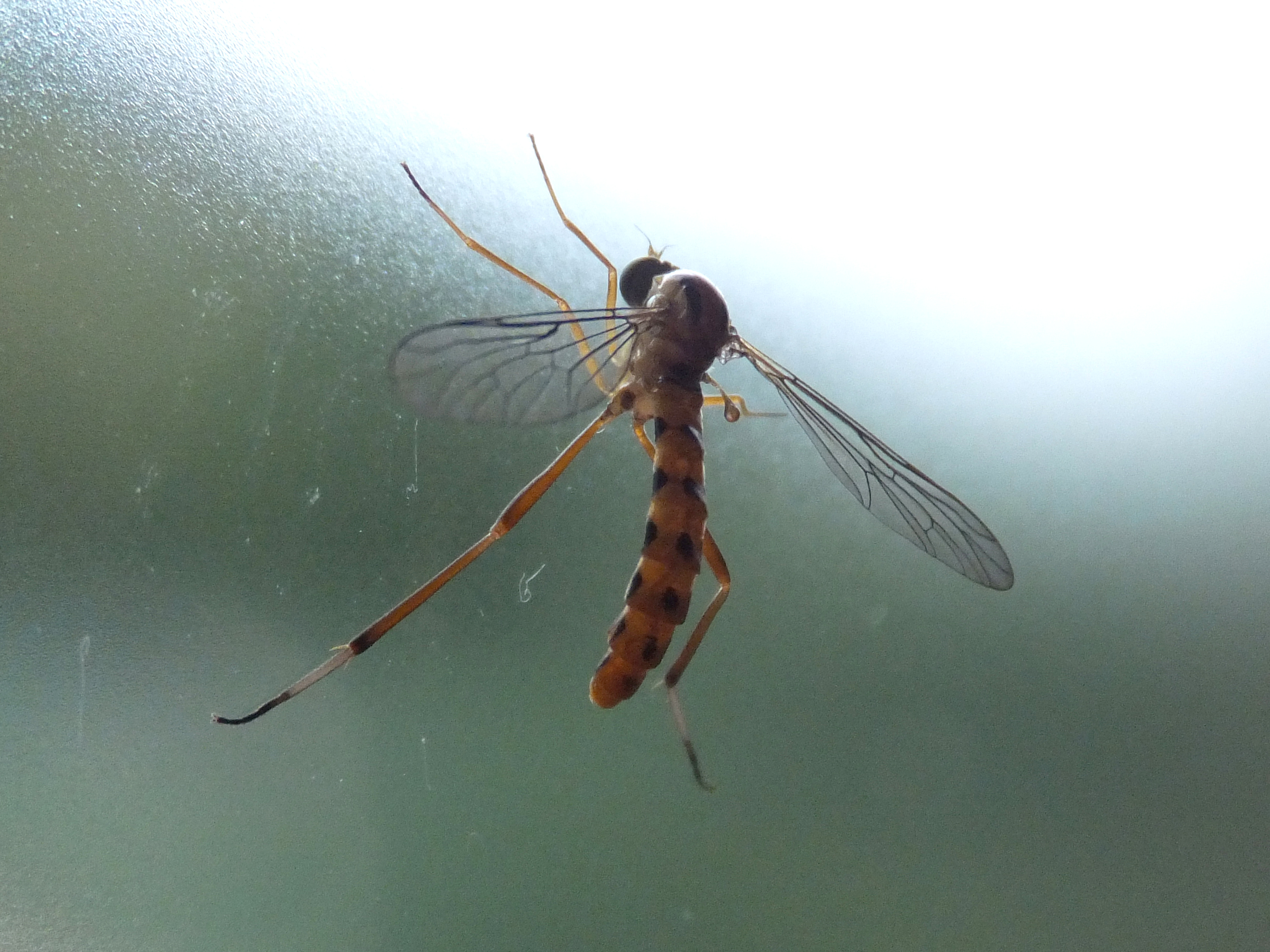
Vermileo vermileo

== Species ==
- Vermileo ater Stuckenberg, 1965
- Vermileo cylindraceus (Costa, 1844)
- Vermileo comstocki Wheeler, 1918 (sierra wormlion)
- Vermileo dowi Wheeler, 1931
- Vermileo fascipennis (Williston, 1895)
- Vermileo immaculatus Carles-tolrá & Cuesta-Seguro, 2020
- Vermileo nigriventris Strobl, 1906
- Vermileo niloticus Edwards, 1935
- Vermileo opacus (Coquillett, 1904)
- Vermileo tibialis (Walker, 1852)
- Vermileo vermileo (Linnaeus, 1758)
- Vermileo willetti Leon, 1938
