= Marilia (insect) =

Scientific classification
- Kingdom: Animalia
- Phylum: Arthropoda
- Clade: Pancrustacea
- Class: Insecta
- Order: Trichoptera
- Family: Odontoceridae
- Genus: Marilia; Mueller, 1880

Genus of caddisflies

Marilia is a genus of mortarjoint casemakers in the family Odontoceridae. There are at least 40 described species in Marilia.

The type species for Marilia is Marilia major F. Mueller.

== Species ==
These 46 species belong to the genus Marilia:

- Marilia aerope Malicky & Chantaramongkol, 1996^{i c g}
- Marilia alata Flint, 1974^{i c g}
- Marilia albicornis (Burmeister, 1839)^{i c g}
- Marilia albofusca Schmid, 1959^{i c g}
- Marilia amnicola Flint, 1968^{i c g}
- Marilia biloba Flint, 1974^{i c g}
- Marilia bola Mosely in Mosely & Kimmins, 1953^{i c g}
- Marilia cinerea Navás, 1931^{i c g}
- Marilia crea Mosely, 1949^{i c g}
- Marilia discaulis^{g}
- Marilia eleutheria Flint, 1983^{i c g}
- Marilia elongata Martynov, 1912^{i c g}
- Marilia fasiculata Banks, 1913^{i c g}
- Marilia flexuosa Ulmer, 1905^{i c g b}
- Marilia fusca Kimmins in Mosely & Kimmins, 1953^{i c g}
- Marilia gigas Flint, 1991^{i c g}
- Marilia gracilis Banks, 1938^{i c g}
- Marilia guaira Flint, 1983^{i c g}
- Marilia humerosa Flint, 1983^{i c g}
- Marilia infundibulum Flint, 1983^{i c g}
- Marilia javana Ulmer, 1951^{i c g}
- Marilia lata Ulmer, 1926^{i c g}
- Marilia lateralis Flint, 1983^{i c g}
- Marilia mahedae Neto, Pes & Hamada, 2017^{g}
- Marilia major Mueller, 1880^{i c g}
- Marilia megalopos^{g}
- Marilia mexicana (Banks, 1901)^{i c g}
- Marilia microps Flint, 1991^{i c g}
- Marilia minor Mueller, 1880^{i c g}
- Marilia misionensis Flint, 1983^{i c g}
- Marilia mixta (Hagen, 1858)^{i c g}
- Marilia modesta Banks, 1913^{i c g}
- Marilia mogtiana Malicky, 1989^{i c g}
- Marilia nebulosa Ulmer, 1951^{i c g}
- Marilia nobsca Milne, 1936^{i c g}
- Marilia parallela Hwang, 1957^{i c g}
- Marilia qinlingensis^{g}
- Marilia salta Flint, 1983^{i c g}
- Marilia scudderi Banks, 1924^{i c g}
- Marilia simulans Forsslund, 1935^{i c g}
- Marilia siolii Marlier, 1964^{i c g}
- Marilia spinosula Flint, 1996^{i c g}
- Marilia sumatrana Ulmer, 1951^{i c g}
- Marilia triangularis Flint, 1983^{i c g}
- Marilia truncata Flint, 1983^{i c g}
- Marilia wrighti Banks, 1924^{i c g}

Data sources: i = ITIS, c = Catalogue of Life, g = GBIF, b = Bugguide.net
