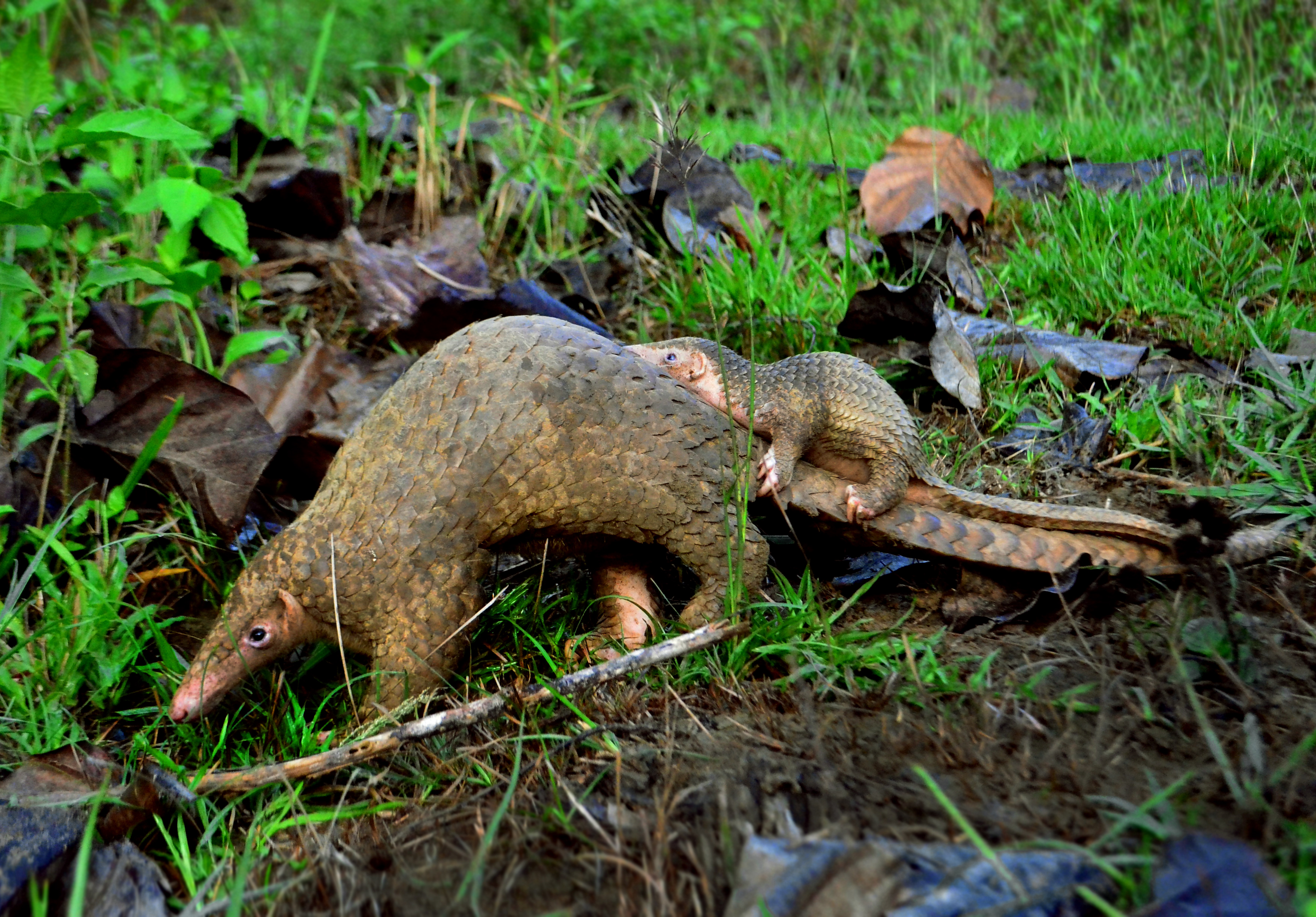
- An adult Philippine Pangolin and her pup photographed in the forests of Palawan

Conservation status
- Critically Endangered (IUCN 3.1)
- CITES Appendix I

Scientific classification
- Kingdom: Animalia
- Phylum: Chordata
- Class: Mammalia
- Order: Pholidota
- Family: Manidae
- Genus: Manis
- Subgenus: Paramanis
- Species: M. culionensis

Binomial name
- Manis culionensis (de Elera, 1915)
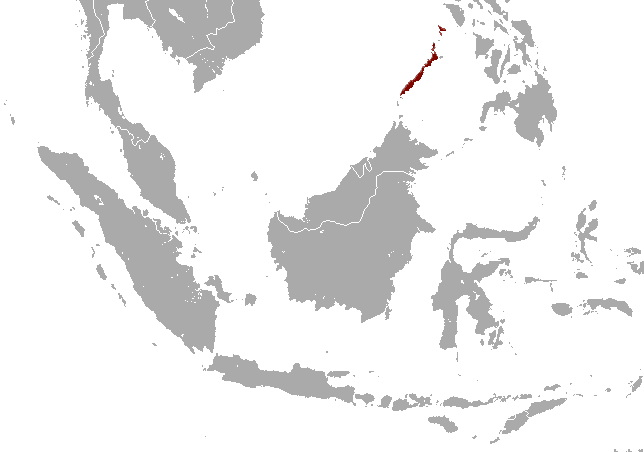
- Philippine pangolin range

= Philippine pangolin =

Species of pangolin

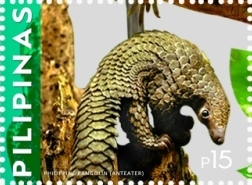
Philippine pangolin on a 2015 stamp of the Philippines

The Philippine pangolin or Palawan pangolin (Manis culionensis), also locally known as balintong, is a pangolin species endemic to the Palawan province of the Philippines. Its habitat includes primary and secondary forests, as well as surrounding grasslands. This species is moderately common within its limited range, but is at risk due to heavy hunting because of its valued scales and meat. This species is distinguished from the closely related Sunda pangolin by its smaller body-to-tail ratio, smaller scales, and a shorter head. It is listed as Critically Endangered by the IUCN, and Critically Endangered by the Palawan Council for Sustainable Development (PCSD).

== Taxonomy ==
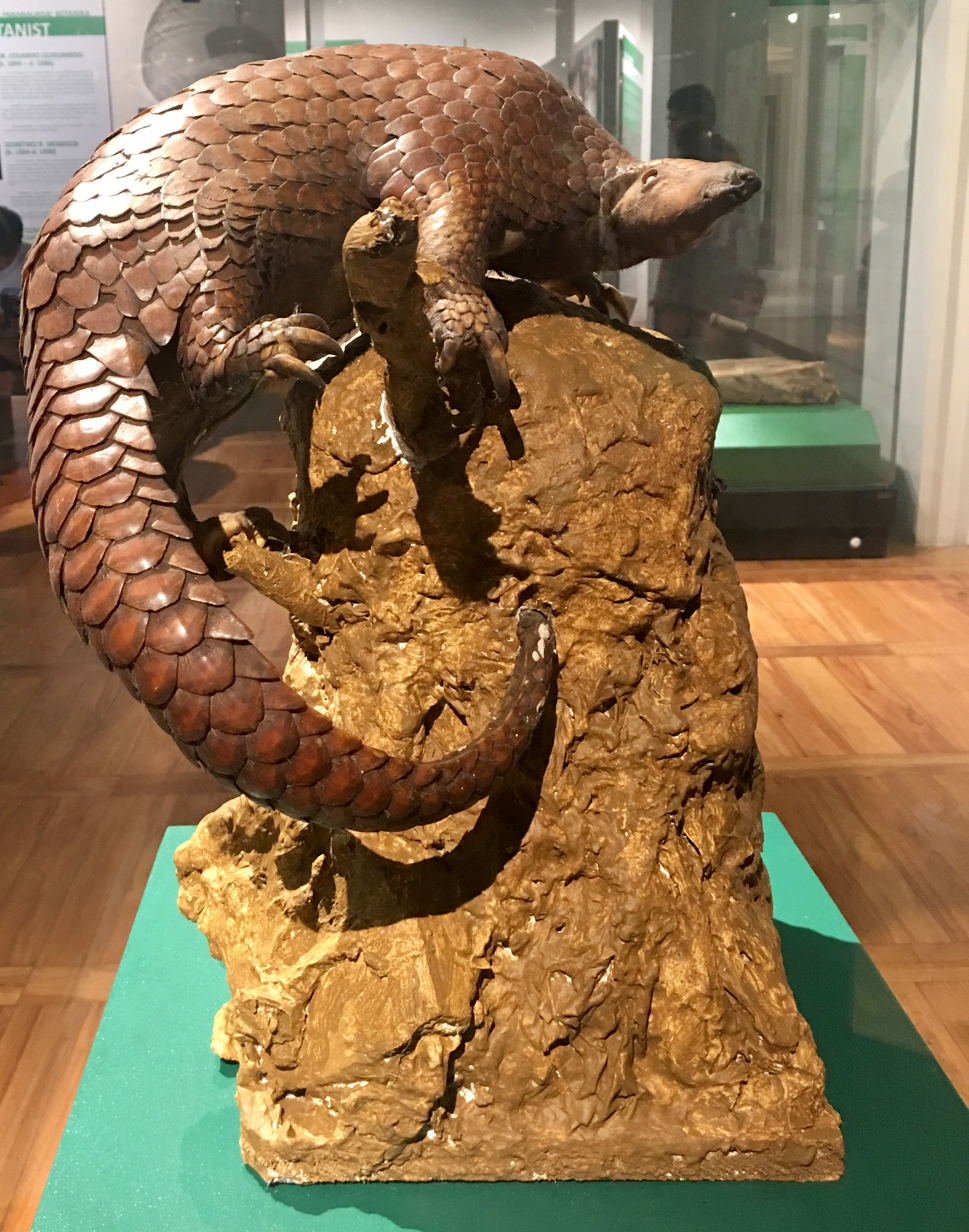
Taxidermied Philippine Pangolin displayed at Philippine National Museum

The species was first described by Casto de Elera in 1915; it was also mentioned by de Elera in an 1895 work. In the past, this species has been included with the Sunda pangolin, Manis javanica, but has been considered a distinct species since 1998. Five distinct morphological characteristics involving the skull and the scales have been identified which separate it from the closely related M. javanica. Both M. javanica and M. culionensis are grouped in subgenus Paramanis. Genetic isolation leading to the speciation between these species is hypothesized to have been caused by rising sea levels severing a land bridge from Borneo in the Early Pleistocene.

The generic name Manis is from the Greek chthonic deity Manes, while the specific name culionensis refers to the island of Culion in Palawan.

The local name balintong (also halintong or malintong) means "one who rolls over" or "one who somersaults" in the Visayan Cuyonon language. Other names in Cuyonon include balekon or balikon and goling, with the same meaning. In the Palawan language, it is also known as tanggiling (also spelled tangiling), also with the same meaning.

== Description ==
The Philippine pangolin is roughly 60 to 89 centimetres (24 to 35 in) long, plus a 36 to 59 centimetres (14 to 23 in) tail. It weighs 2.2 to 7.3 lb (1 to 3 kg). Philippine pangolins in captivity can live up to about 20 years. It is covered in small triangular scales made of keratin everywhere except the underbelly and face, making up at least 20% of its body weight. It regrows new scales when they are lost and always has the same number of scales throughout their lifespan. The scales come in shades of brown, yellow, and olive, making for adequate camouflage at night. Newer offspring have much softer scales than adults and tend to weigh about 90–500 grams (3–18 oz). Areas of the body without scales are covered in a layer of hair.

The Philippine pangolin has five sharp claws per foot and powerful appendages used for digging. However, these claws are not used as weapons for attacking or defending against other animals. Pangolins can also run solely on their hind legs for a duration, using their tail for balance. Its tail is prehensile, allowing it to grab onto branches or stand on its hind legs, despite being covered in scales. The tail also aids the species with climbing and standing upright or to be used as a weapon to puncture enemies using its sharp scales.

The Philippine pangolin's tongue can stretch up to 25 cm (10 inches) long and is coated in an adhesive saliva that is helpful for catching insects. Its head is cone shaped with a long snout and no teeth.

== Diet ==
The Philippine pangolin is a myrmecophage, so has a diet consisting mainly of but not limited to termites and ants. It has in incredible sense of smell that it uses to find its food. The Philippine pangolin is seem to have strong preferences when it comes to the insects they eat, selectively consuming a certain species of ant or termite they like, or even actively avoiding certain species when there is enough of a food abundance to be picky. Its forefeet are used to dig into mounds and logs while its tongue harvests insects. The pangolin will only ever eat a portion of a termite or ant colony, leaving most of the mound/hill intact for the colony to regrow and act as a continuous food source for the pangolin later down the line. It consumes sand and small stones to help grind food in their stomachs.

== Behavior ==
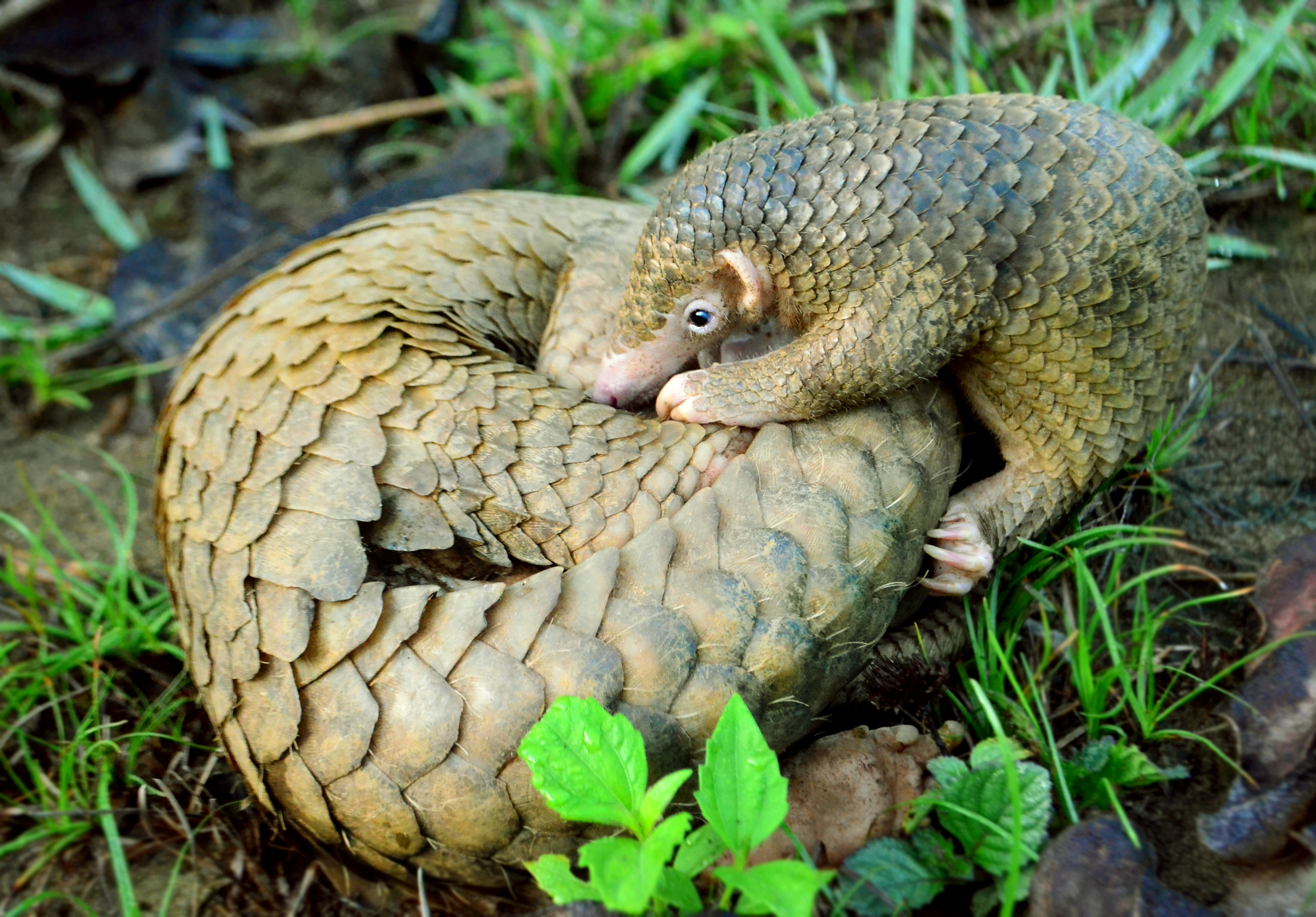
A Philippine Pangolin pup nudges its mother, rolled up into a protective ball.

The Philippine pangolin is nocturnal and reclusive, tending towards being solitary or in pairs. They are mainly active at night, so their eyesight is below average. While their hearing is still only average, they make up for their lack of vision with their extraordinary sense of smell. It generally travels slowly, but can move in a short burst towards safety when it becomes startled, and even has a limited ability to swim. Occasionally, it can be seen standing on its hind legs, balancing on its tail, to help detect nearby predators.

While some of their time is spent on the ground foraging, Philippine pangolins are arboreal, and tend to stay in the tree canopy. When sleeping, they prefer to take refuge inside hollow trees. When threatened, them, like all pangolins, secrete a foul odor and roll into a ball, relying on the protection provided by their scales. Many even sleep rolled up into a ball to protect themselves while they are unaware. They are not known for being territorial animals, but they may be seen leaving their scent to let others know they have taken refuge there for a while.

== Reproduction ==
While little is known about the reproduction of Philippine pangolins, their mating habits are thought to be similar to that of the Sunda pangolin. Like most pangolins, Philippine pangolins mate in the spring. The same odorous secretion used as a self-defense mechanism is also used in mating habits. The secretion is used by males to assert against other males, attract a mate, and are used by the mother while nurturing their young.

The young are born after a gestation period of around 18 weeks and are suckled by their mothers at about four months. Usually, only one offspring is born at once, and they are carried around on the mothers back for a time. When sleeping or threatened, the mother tends to roll in a ball for defense like usual, but with the young cradled in a ball of their own, encompassed in the mother's ball. At the age of about 5 months, the young will separate from their mother. Female pangolins even adopt lone young that have lost their own mother.

== Hunting and conservation ==
The Philippine pangolin, much like every other species of pangolin, is considered threatened due to how sought after they are to hunters. Other than the meat, which is a delicacy in certain Asian cultures, the Philippine Pangolin is hunted for their scales, organs, and skin, which are used in traditional medicine. In 2016, the Convention on International Trade in Endangered Species (CITES) listed the animal as protected under Appendix I (meaning commercial international trade was prohibited) due to how much international trade influenced pangolin hunting. The Zoological Society of London has listed the mammal as an EDGE species.

== Predation ==
Besides humans, the only known predator of Philippine pangolins are reticulated pythons.
