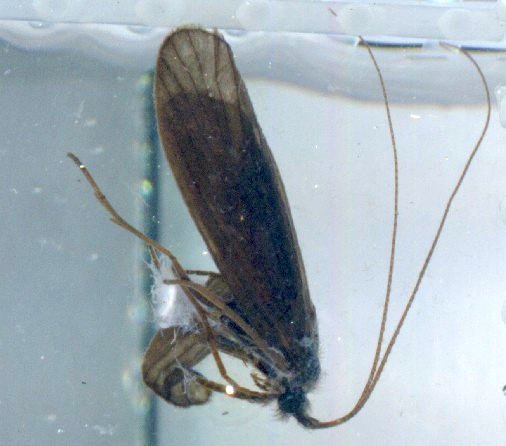
- Odontocerum albicorne

Scientific classification
- Kingdom: Animalia
- Phylum: Arthropoda
- Clade: Pancrustacea
- Class: Insecta
- Order: Trichoptera
- Family: Odontoceridae
- Subfamily: Odontocerinae
- Genus: Odontocerum; Leach in Brewster, 1815

= Odontocerum =

Genus of caddisflies

Odontocerum is a genus of mortarjoint casemakers in the family Odontoceridae. There are at least three described species in Odontocerum.

== Species ==
- Odontocerum albicorne (Scopoli, 1763)
- Odontocerum hellenicum Malicky, 1972
- Odontocerum lusitanicum Malicky, 1975
