= Alexanderia =

Scientific classification
- Kingdom: Animalia
- Phylum: Arthropoda
- Class: Insecta
- Order: Diptera
- Superfamily: Psychodoidea
- Family: Psychodidae
- Subfamily: Bruchomyiinae
- Genus: Alexanderia; Wagner & Kvifte, 2018

Type species
- Nemopalpus orientaliss Edwards, 1928

Genus of flies

Alexanderia is a genus of moth flies in the subfamily Bruchomyiinae. This genus circumscribes species from south-east Asia, with three including the type, transferred from the genus Nemopalpus.

== Species ==
- Alexanderia orientalis (Edwards, 1928)
- Alexanderia thailandensis Polseela, Wagner, Kvifte, Rulik & Apiwathnisorn, 2018
- Alexanderia unicolor (Edwards, 1933) - Borneo
- Alexanderia vietnamensis (Quate, 1962)
