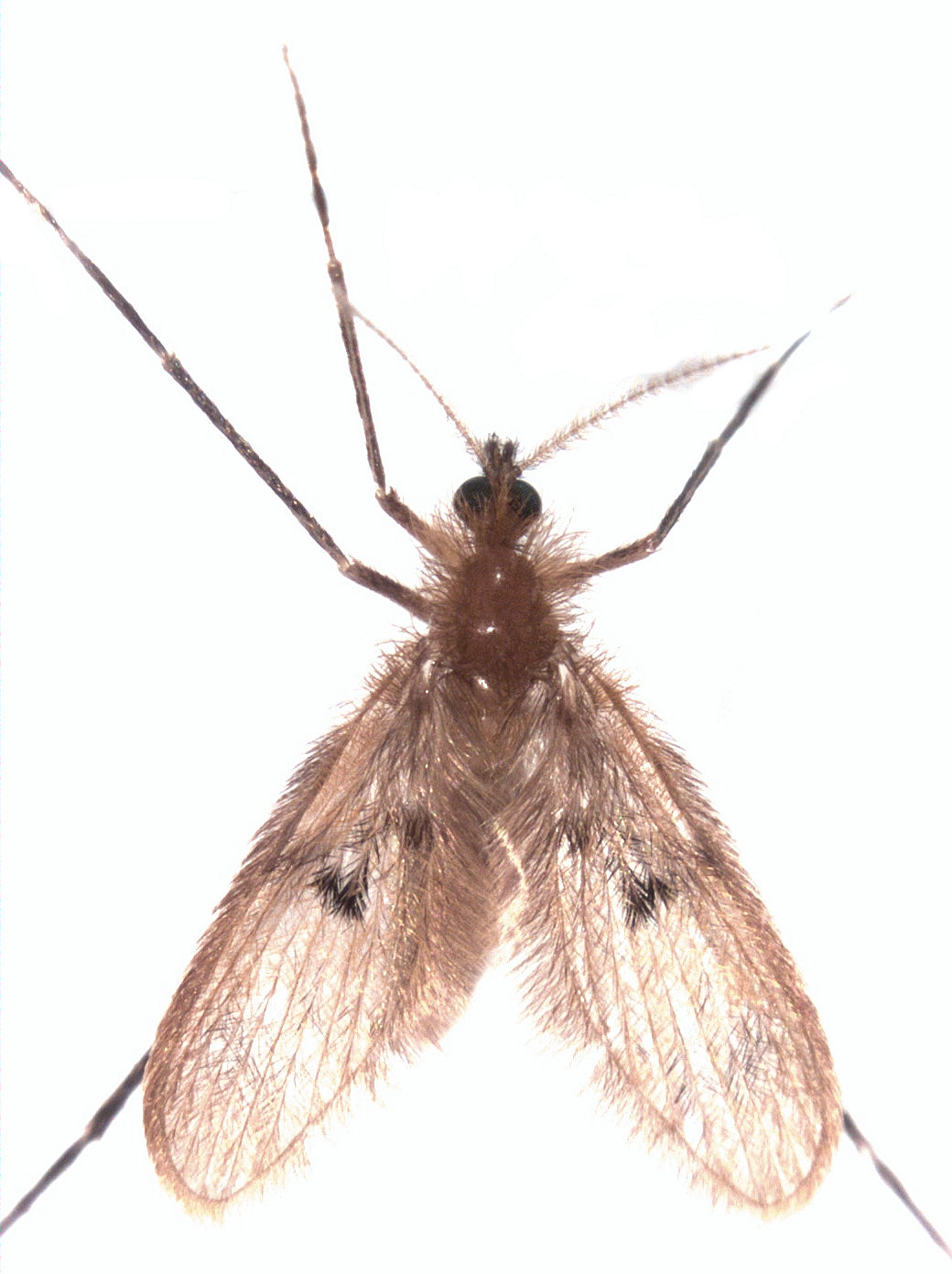
- Notofairchildia zelandiae (previously placed in Nemopalpus)

Scientific classification
- Kingdom: Animalia
- Phylum: Arthropoda
- Class: Insecta
- Order: Diptera
- Family: Psychodidae
- Subfamily: Bruchomyiinae; Alexander, 1921

= Bruchomyiinae =

Subfamily of flies

The subfamily Bruchomyiinae contains genera of moth flies in the order Diptera, was originally described by the American entomologist Charles Paul Alexander.

== Circumscription ==
For many years the Bruchomyiinae consisted of just three genera, distinguished by the number of segments in the antennae: Bruchomyia (24-29 segments), Eutonnoiria (111 segments) and Nemopalpus (14 segments). A number of species of the cosmopolitan genus Nemopalpus were transferred in 2016, to the genera: Boreofairchildia, Laurenceomyia and Notofairchildia, with oriental species subsequently (2018) placed in Alexanderia.

== Genera ==
Systema Dipterorum currently includes:

- Alexanderia Wagner & Kvifte, 2018 (Oriental)
- Boreofairchildia Wagner & Stuckenberg, 2016 (Americas)
- Bruchomyia Alexander, 1921 (South America):
- Eutonnoiria Alexander, 1940 (Central Africa)
- Laurenceomyia Wagner & Stuckenberg, 2016 (South America)
- Nemopalpus Macquart, 1838
- Notofairchildia Wagner & Stuckenberg, 2016
- †Hoffeinsodes Wagner, 2017 Baltic amber, Eocene
- †Palaeoglaesum Wagner, 2017
