= Bruchomyia =

Scientific classification
- Kingdom: Animalia
- Phylum: Arthropoda
- Class: Insecta
- Order: Diptera
- Superfamily: Psychodoidea
- Family: Psychodidae
- Subfamily: Bruchomyiinae
- Genus: Bruchomyia; Alexander, 1921

Type species
- Bruchomyia argentina Alexander, 1921

Genus of flies

Bruchomyia is a genus of moth flies in the subfamily Bruchomyiinae. Species have been recorded principally from South America.

== Species ==
- Bruchomyia almeidai Barretto & Andretta, 1946
- Bruchomyia andina Quate, Pérez & Ogusuku, 2000
- Bruchomyia argentina Alexander, 1921
- Bruchomyia brasiliensis Alexander, 1940
- Bruchomyia fusca Barretto, 1950
- Bruchomyia mineira Bravo & Barata, 2012
- Bruchomyia peruviana Alexander, 1929
- Bruchomyia plaumanni Alexander, 1944
- Bruchomyia shannoni Alexander, 1929
- Bruchomyia unicolor Barretto, 1950
