= Boreofairchildia =

Scientific classification
- Kingdom: Animalia
- Phylum: Arthropoda
- Class: Insecta
- Order: Diptera
- Superfamily: Psychodoidea
- Family: Psychodidae
- Subfamily: Bruchomyiinae
- Genus: Boreofairchildia; Wagner & Stuckenberg, 2016

Synonyms
- Nemopalpus (several species)

Genus of flies

Boreofairchildia is a genus of moth flies in the subfamily Bruchomyiinae. Species have been recorded from the Americas, principally Central and South America, with many, including the type, transferred from the genus Nemopalpus.

== Description ==
The genus name was dedicated to G. B. Fairchild, for his contributions to Neotropical Psychodidae and medical entomology. "According to cladistics analysis, the diagnostic characters of this genus are: aedeagus as long as or slightly shorter than ejaculatory apodeme and gonocoxites; gonocoxites without medial appendages, gonostyli basally broad, with two or more distal projections."

== Species ==
Unless referenced otherwise, Systema Dipterorum includes:

1. Boreofairchildia alexanderi Santos, Brazil & Pinto, 2021
2. Boreofairchildia antillarum (Fairchild, 1952)
3. Boreofairchildia arroyoi (León, 1950)
4. Boreofairchildia belti Ježek, Oboňa, Pont, Maes & Mollinedo, 2018
5. Boreofairchildia dominicana Wagner, 2017
6. Boreofairchildia mopani (León, 1950)
7. Boreofairchildia moralesi (León, 1950)
8. Boreofairchildia multisetosus (Alexander, 1979)
9. Boreofairchildia nearctica (Young, 1974) (sugarfoot moth fly)
10. Boreofairchildia parvus (Santos, Falqueta & Bravo, 2013)
11. Boreofairchildia patriciae (Alexander, 1987)
12. Boreofairchildia scheveni (Wagner, 2006)
13. Boreofairchildia sziladyi (Tonnoir, 1940) – type species
14. Boreofairchildia torrealbai (Ortiz & Scorza, 1963)
15. Boreofairchildia youngi (Wagner, 2000)
16. Boreofairchildia yucatanensis (Vargas & Díaz Nájera, 1958)
