= Lampromyia =

Scientific classification
- Kingdom: Animalia
- Phylum: Arthropoda
- Class: Insecta
- Order: Diptera
- Family: Vermileonidae
- Genus: Lampromyia; Macquart, 1835

Type species
- Lampromyia pallida Macquart, 1835

Synonyms
- Lampromiya Dufour, 1849

Genus of flies

Lampromyia is a genus of wormlion in the family Vermileonidae.

== Species ==
- Lampromyia bellasiciliae Kehlmaier, 2014
- Lampromyia canariensis Macquart, 1839
- Lampromyia cylindrica (Fabricius, 1794)
- Lampromyia fortunata Stuckenberg, 1971
- Lampromyia funebris Dufour, 1850
- Lampromyia hemmigseni Stuckenberg, 1971
- Lampromyia iberica Stuckenberg, 1998
- Lampromyia lecerfi Séguy, 1930
- Lampromyia namaquaensis Stuckenberg, 1961
- Lampromyia nigripennis Séguy, 1930
- Lampromyia pallida Macquart, 1835
- Lampromyia pilosula Engel, 1929
- Lampromyia rebecca Stuckenberg, 1996
