= Perissoneura =

Scientific classification
- Kingdom: Animalia
- Phylum: Arthropoda
- Clade: Pancrustacea
- Class: Insecta
- Order: Trichoptera
- Family: Odontoceridae
- Subfamily: Odontocerinae
- Genus: Perissoneura; McLachlan, 1871

Genus of caddisflies

Perissoneura is a genus of caddisflies in the family Odontoceridae.

== Species ==
- Perissoneura chrysea
- Perissoneura diversipennis
- Perissoneura paradoxa
