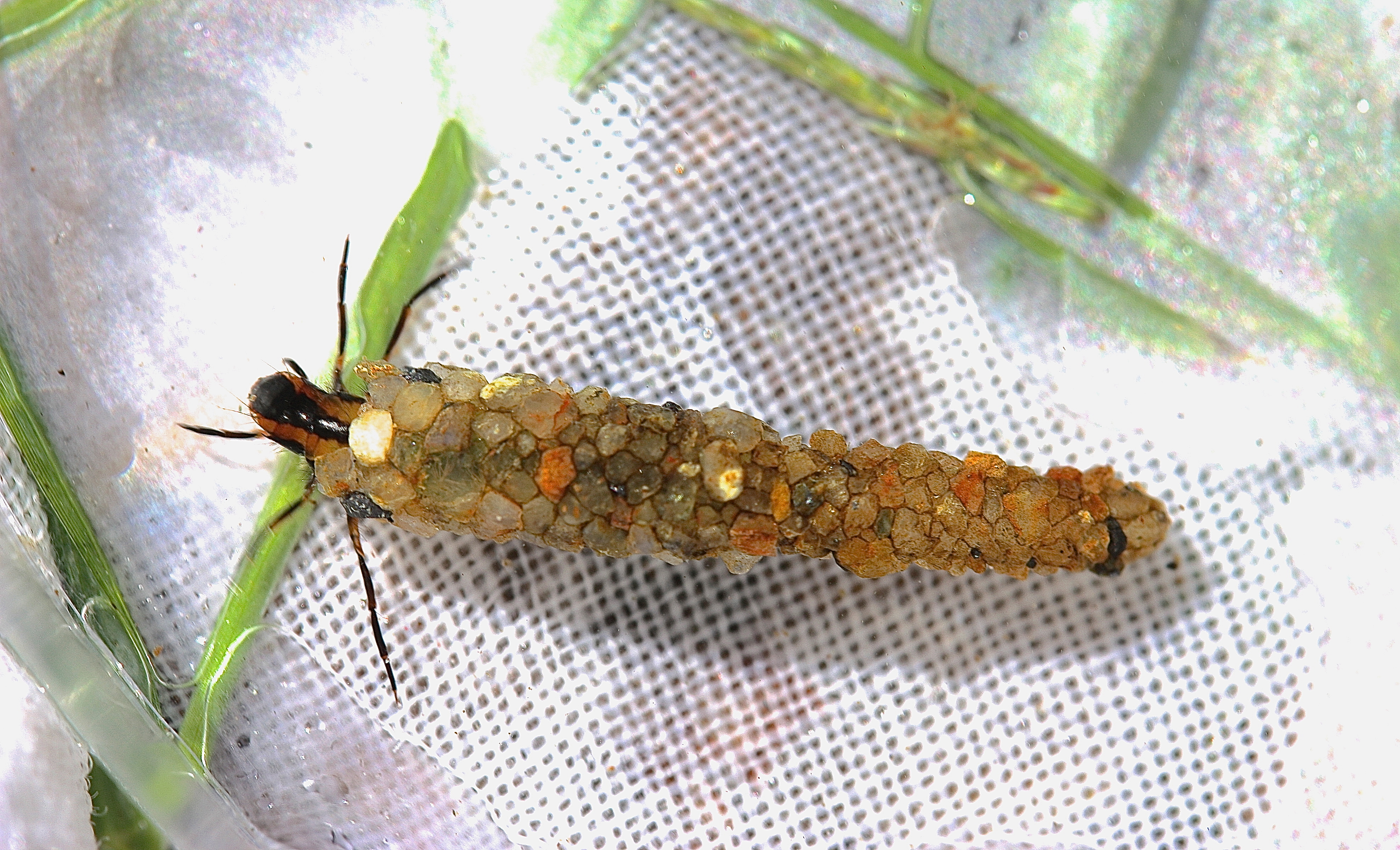
- Psilotreta labida

Scientific classification
- Kingdom: Animalia
- Phylum: Arthropoda
- Clade: Pancrustacea
- Class: Insecta
- Order: Trichoptera
- Family: Odontoceridae
- Genus: Psilotreta; Banks, 1899

= Psilotreta =

Genus of caddisflies

Psilotreta is a genus of mortarjoint casemakers in the family Odontoceridae. There are more than 30 described species in the genus Psilotreta.

== Species ==
These 39 species belong to the genus Psilotreta:

- Psilotreta abudeb Malicky & Chantaramongkol, 1991
- Psilotreta aello Malicky & Chantaramongkol, 1996
- Psilotreta aidoneus Malicky, 1997
- Psilotreta albogera Mey, 1997
- Psilotreta amera Ross, 1939
- Psilotreta androconiata Mey, 1997
- Psilotreta assamensis Parker & Wiggins, 1987
- Psilotreta baureo Malicky, 1989
- Psilotreta bidens Mey, 1995
- Psilotreta chinensis Banks, 1940
- Psilotreta daidalos Malicky, 2000
- Psilotreta daktylos Malicky, 2000
- Psilotreta daphnis Malicky, 2000
- Psilotreta dardanos Malicky, 2000
- Psilotreta falcula Botosaneanu, 1970
- Psilotreta frigidaria Mey, 1997
- Psilotreta frontalis Banks, 1899
- Psilotreta illuan Malicky, 1989
- Psilotreta indecisa (Walker, 1852)
- Psilotreta japonica (Banks, 1906)
- Psilotreta jaroschi Malicky, 1995
- Psilotreta kisoensis Iwata, 1928
- Psilotreta kwantungensis Ulmer, 1926
- Psilotreta labida Ross, 1944
- Psilotreta lobopennis Hwang, 1957
- Psilotreta locumtenens Botosaneanu, 1970
- Psilotreta ochina Mosely, 1942
- Psilotreta orientalis Hwang, 1957
- Psilotreta papaceki Malicky, 1995
- Psilotreta pyonga Olah, 1985
- Psilotreta quadrata Schmid, 1959
- Psilotreta quin Malicky & Chantaramongkol, 1991
- Psilotreta quinlani Kimmins, 1964
- Psilotreta rossi Wallace, 1970
- Psilotreta rufa (Hagen, 1861)
- Psilotreta schmidi Parker & Wiggins, 1987
- Psilotreta spitzeri Malicky, 1995
- Psilotreta trispinosa Schmid, 1965
- Psilotreta watananikorni Malicky & Chantaramongkol in Malicky, 1995
