= Nerophilus =

Scientific classification
- Kingdom: Animalia
- Phylum: Arthropoda
- Clade: Pancrustacea
- Class: Insecta
- Order: Trichoptera
- Family: Odontoceridae
- Genus: Nerophilus; Banks, 1899
- Species: N. californicus

Binomial name
- Nerophilus californicus (Hagen, 1861)

Genus of caddisflies

Nerophilus is a genus of mortarjoint casemakers in the family Odontoceridae. There is one described species in Nerophilus, N. californicus.
