= Vermiophis =

Scientific classification
- Kingdom: Animalia
- Phylum: Arthropoda
- Class: Insecta
- Order: Diptera
- Family: Vermileonidae
- Genus: Vermiophis; Yang, 1979

Type species
- Vermiophis ganquanensis Yang, 1979

Genus of flies

Vermiophis is a genus of wormlion in the family Vermileonidae.

== Species ==
- Vermiophis ganguanensis Yang, 1979
- Vermiophis ganquanensis Yang, 1979
- Vermiophis minshanensis Yang & Chen, 1993
- Vermiophis taihangensis Yang & Chen, 1993
- Vermiophis taishanensis Yang & Chen, 1993
- Vermiophis tibetensis Yang & Chen, 1987
- Vermiophis wudangensis Yang & Chen, 1986
- Vermiophis yanshanensis Yang & Chen, 1993
