= Protovermileo =

Protovermileo Temporal range: Priabonian

Scientific classification
- Kingdom: Animalia
- Phylum: Arthropoda
- Clade: Pancrustacea
- Class: Insecta
- Order: Diptera
- Family: Vermileonidae
- Genus: †Protovermileo; Hennig, 1967
- Species: †P. electricus

Binomial name
- †Protovermileo electricus Hennig, 1967

Genus of flies

Protovermileo is an extinct genus of wormlion in the family Vermileonidae. It contains only the species Protovermileo electricus, which is known from Baltic amber.
