= Namamyia =

Scientific classification
- Kingdom: Animalia
- Phylum: Arthropoda
- Clade: Pancrustacea
- Class: Insecta
- Order: Trichoptera
- Family: Odontoceridae
- Genus: Namamyia; Banks, 1905
- Species: N. plutonis

Binomial name
- Namamyia plutonis Banks, 1905

Genus of caddisflies

Namamyia is a genus of mortarjoint casemakers in the family Odontoceridae. There is one described species in Namamyia, N. plutonis.
