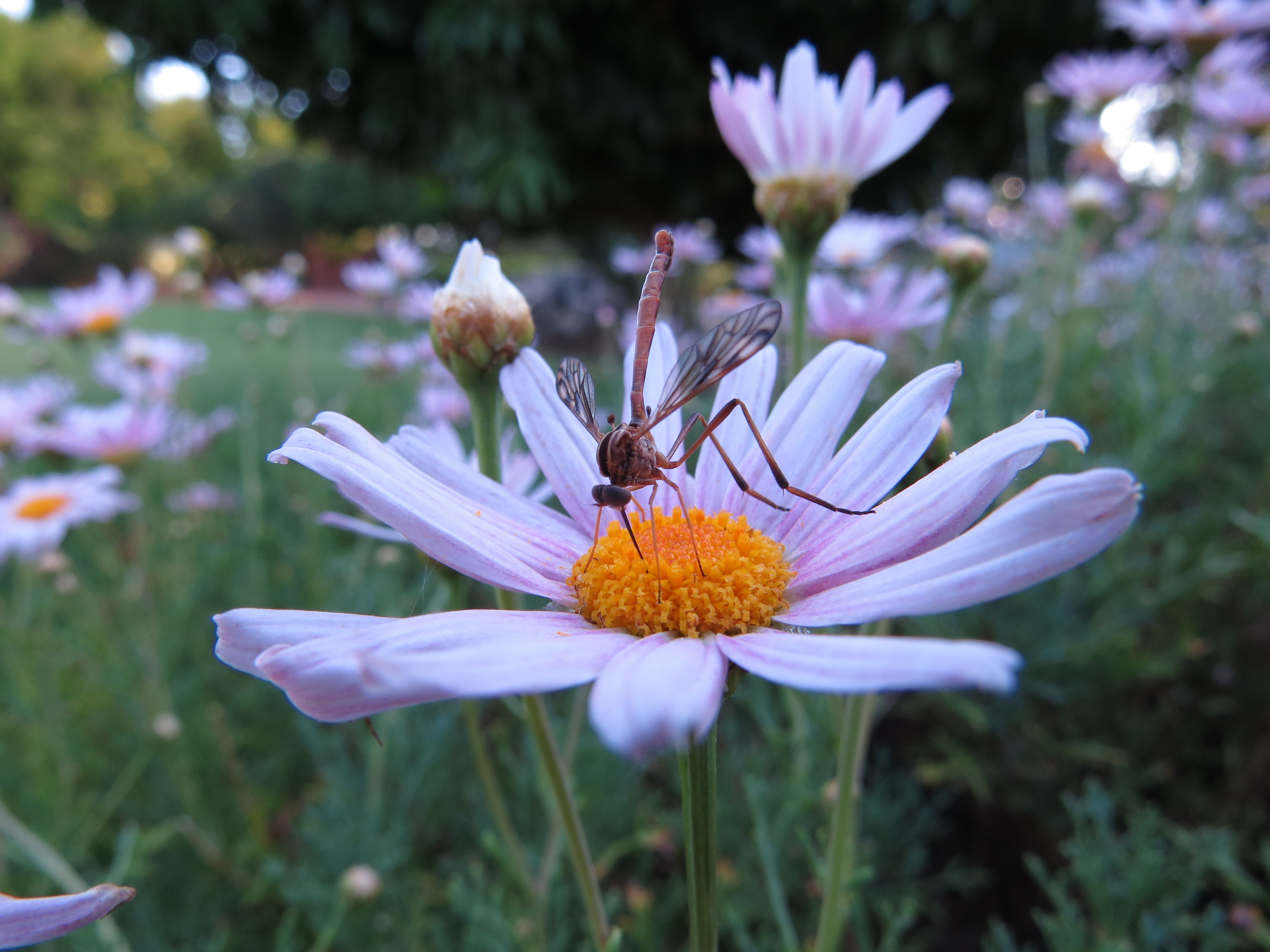
- Adult wormlion, Leptynoma sp., showing proboscis, wing venation, and habitus

Scientific classification
- Kingdom: Animalia
- Phylum: Arthropoda
- Clade: Pancrustacea
- Class: Insecta
- Order: Diptera
- Suborder: Brachycera
- Infraorder: Vermileonomorpha
- Family: Vermileonidae; Williston, 1886

Genera
- Alhajarmyia Stuckenberg, 2003; Isalomyia Stuckenberg, 2002; Lampromyia Macquart, 1835; Leptynoma Westwood, 1876; Namaquamyia Stuckenberg, 2002; Perianthomyia Stuckenberg, 1996; †Protovermileo Hennig, 1967; Vermileo Macquart, 1834; Vermilynx Stuckenberg, 1995; Vermiophis Yang, 1979; Vermipardus Stuckenberg, 1960; Vermitigris Wheeler, 1930

= Vermileonidae =

Wormlions

Family of wormlion flies

The Brachyceran family Vermileonidae (the sole family in the infraorder Vermileonomorpha) is a small fly family of uncertain affinities and unusual biology. It includes fewer than 80 described species, most of them rare and with restricted distribution, in 11 genera. Historically the vermileonids had been regarded as belonging to the family Rhagionidae, possibly in a subfamily Vermileoninae. Their biology and morphology are so markedly distinct from the main Rhagionidae sensu stricto however, that the placement as a separate family has been widely accepted. They are called wormlions, in analogy to antlions, as their worm-like larvae make pits in the sand to trap prey.

== Adult ==
The adults are slender, fragile, long-legged flies, vaguely reminiscent of small crane flies. The adults generally visit flowers for nectar, but adults of some species may not feed at all. The mouthparts of the adult are hypognathous, used mainly for extracting nectar from flowers, long, and straight. This might have something to do with the common name "snipe-fly" for the family Rhagionidae, but it would be misleading to use that name for Vermileonidae now, as they are no longer included in the Rhagionidae, which still are called snipe-flies.

Most vermileonid species are found in the drier regions of the western parts of Africa, from the Cape to Morocco, and also in the western parts of the Iberian Peninsula, mainly in Portugal.

== Larvae ==
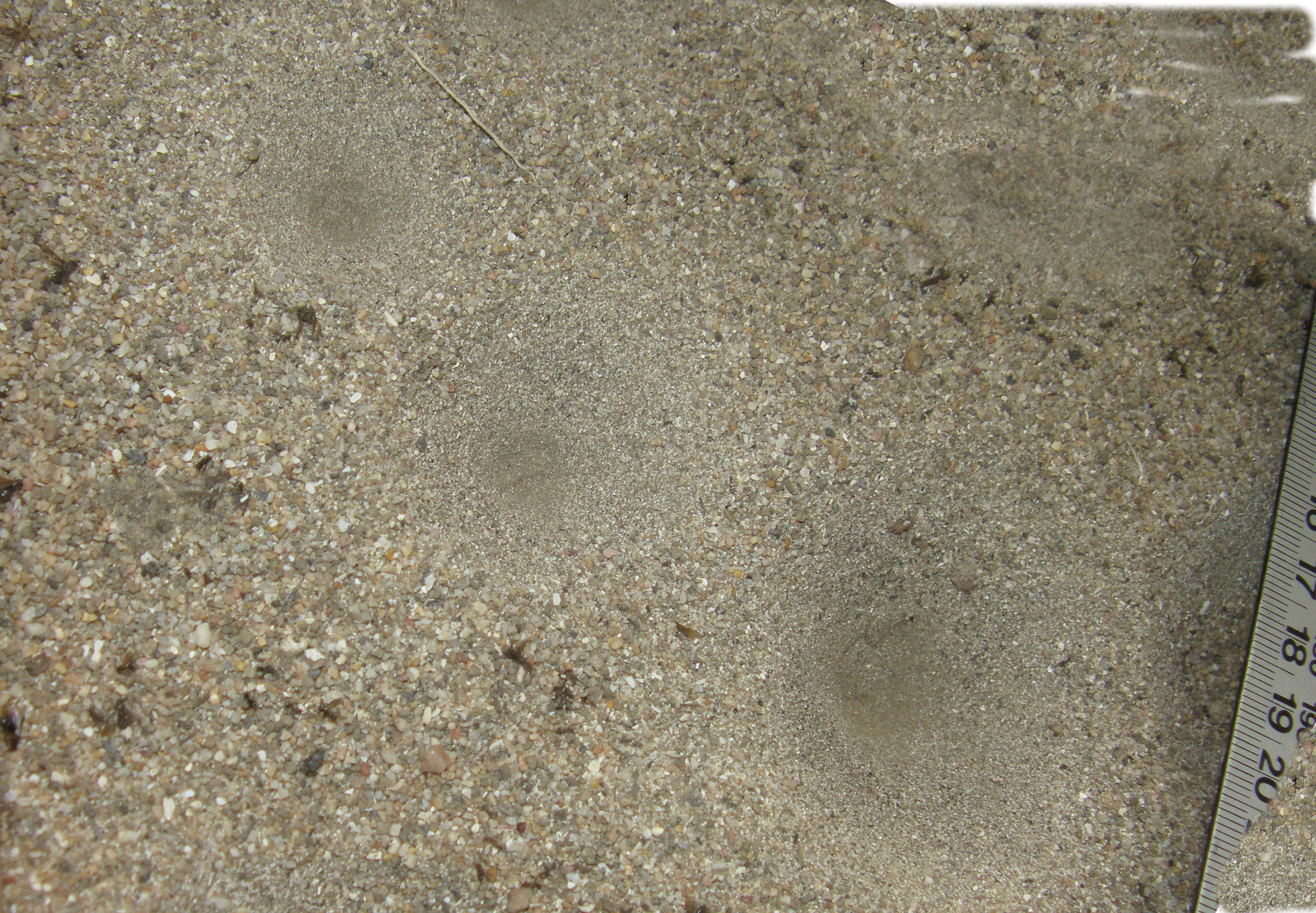
Pit traps of a larva of the wormlion Leptynoma sericea; the outline of the larva on its back under the sand is faintly visible, in contrast to most pit-digging antlions

The larvae of vermileonids are called wormlions which amounts to a direct translation of Vermileo. They have evolved the same elaborate mechanism for trapping prey, as one sees in many species of the Neuropteran family Myrmeleontidae, the so-called "antlions"; that is, they make cone-shaped pits in sandy areas and feed on insects that fall into the pits. The mechanism is elegant in that in both groups of insects, the larva creates the pit by flinging particles out. Much of the material falls back, coming to rest at effectively the critical angle of repose. This is a good example for convergent evolution.

Thus, when a small insect, commonly an ant, blunders into the pit, its weight causes the sand to collapse below it, drawing the victim toward the center, where the larva lies in wait under a thin layer of loose sand. As soon as it is alerted by falling sand grains, the larva assists this process by vigorously flicking more sand out from the center of the pit. This undermines the pit walls and causes them to collapse toward the center. The sand that the larva now is flinging also pelts the prey with so much loose, rolling material as to prevent it from getting any foothold on the easier slopes that the initial collapse of the slope has presented. The combined effect is to bring the prey down to within grasp of the larva, which then can inject venom and digestive fluids.

Unlike the pit-digging Myrmeleontidae, vermileonid larvae do not travel round and round while digging the pit trap. Instead, they simply lie at the center with the rear end buried, and dig their heads repeatedly forward into the sand, flinging it out by vigorously straightening their fore ends. In contrast with conical digging, this approach is believed to take longer since more sand is likely to fall back into the pit when throwing from the center. Finally, they cover themselves with a thin layer of sand while lying across the bottom of the cone. Wormlion larvae prefer shaded habitats over lit ones, fine sand of small particle size over coarser sand, and obstacle free soil. All these factors enable them to construct large pits. Unfavorable conditions lead to more frequent relocation of the pits.

The main enemies of the larvae of either antlions or wormlions are ground-hunting birds such as hoopoes and gallinaceous birds that learn to recognise their pits and probe or scratch them from the sand. If alarmed by such activity, the wormlion larva retracts abruptly into an S-shape under the sand, and if dug out, it retains that shape, not having much option for an alternative strategy at its disposal. Actually, because its skin is coated with sand, and it is very small, it is very easy to overlook while it lies still. However, if it is sufficiently teased after being dug out, it may begin to lash about powerfully, flinging itself away with enough force to escape its tormentor. It does not, however, hook its mouthparts into its hinder end to achieve an efficient leap such as some fruit fly and carrion fly larvae do.

The 10th and 11th segment of the larva each bears a transverse row of long hooklets that it uses in anchoring itself and in shifting sand. The fifth segment has a ventral pseudopod that helps to hold prey. Not having sickle jaws like an antlion, the larva grasps prey by lashing forward and catching the victim by bending the head down to catch it between its two fang-like jaws and its pseudopod.

Like antlion larvae, vermileonid larvae are primarily found in sandy habitats, often semi-deserts, usually in the shelter of rocks or bushes, and they are voracious predators.

== Classification ==
The family Vermilionidae is sometimes kept separately within the infraorder Vermileonomorpha but a 2022 study placed it within the Xylophagomorpha as a sister group of the Xylophagidae.

== Species lists ==
- Palaearctic (Broken link)
