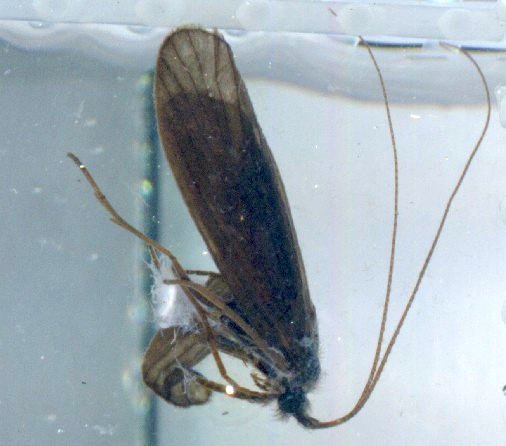
- Odontocerum albicorne

Scientific classification
- Kingdom: Animalia
- Phylum: Arthropoda
- Clade: Pancrustacea
- Class: Insecta
- Order: Trichoptera
- Superfamily: Leptoceroidea
- Family: Odontoceridae; Wallengren, 1891

= Odontoceridae =

Family of caddisflies

Odontoceridae is a family of mortarjoint casemakers in the order Trichoptera. There are about 12 genera and at least 100 described species in Odontoceridae.

The type genus for Odontoceridae is Odontocerum W.E. Leach, 1815.

== Genera ==
- Barynema Banks, 1939
- Barypenthus Burmeister, 1839
- Inthanopsyche Malicky, 1989
- Lannapsyche Malicky, 1989
- Marilia Mueller, 1880
- Namamyia Banks, 1905
- Nerophilus Banks, 1899
- Odontocerum Leach in Brewster, 1815
- Parthina Denning, 1954
- Perissoneura McLachlan, 1871
- Pseudogoera Carpenter, 1933
- Psilotreta Banks, 1899
