= Brian Roy Stuckenberg =

Brian Roy Stuckenberg (7 April 1930 – 8 February 2009) was a South African entomologist who specialised in Diptera.

Stuckenberg was of Danish descent, his great-uncle was the poet Viggo Stuckenberg. Stuckenberg was head of Entomology at the Natal Museum (now KwaZulu-Natal Museum) in Pietermaritzburg, South Africa. He became Africa’s leading dipterist, building one of the largest collections of Afrotropical flies in the world. He wrote over 100 publications., including the sections on the families Blephariceridae, Thaumaleidae, Xylomyidae, Rhagionidae, Athericidae, Apioceridae and Opomyzidae in Crosskey, R.W., ed., Catalogue of the Diptera of the Afrotropical Region. London: British Museum (Natural History), p. 635 and worked on Vermileonidae.

He collected Diptera in South Africa, Angola, Kenya, Lesotho, Madagascar, Malawi, Mozambique, Namibia, Swaziland, Zimbabwe, Chile and Argentina. Stuckenberg was a Fellow of the Royal Entomological Society of London.
