= List of Pericoma species =

This is a list of 191 species in Pericoma, a genus of moth flies in the family Psychodidae.

== Pericoma species ==
- Pericoma acuminata Strobl, 1901^{c g}
- Pericoma affinis Krek, 1985^{c g}
- Pericoma agreste Quate & Quate, 1967^{c g}
- Pericoma alaeoensis Kaul, 1971^{c g}
- Pericoma alba (Sara, 1952)^{c g}
- Pericoma albipes Tonnoir, 1953^{c g}
- Pericoma albitarsis (Banks, 2895)^{i c g}
- Pericoma alfaroana (Dyar, 1926)^{c g}
- Pericoma alhambrana Vaillant, 1978^{c g}
- Pericoma alticola Vaillant, 1955^{c g}
- Pericoma americana Kincaid, 1901^{i c g}
- Pericoma amplipenna (Knab, 1914)^{c g}
- Pericoma ancyla Quate, 1955^{i c g}
- Pericoma anderssoni (Nielsen, 1965)^{c g}
- Pericoma antennata Krek, 1983^{g}
- Pericoma arvernica Vaillant, 1978^{c g}
- Pericoma aterrima (Banks, 1914)^{i c g}
- Pericoma atlantica (Satchell, 1955)^{c g}
- Pericoma attenuata Vaillant, 1978^{c g}
- Pericoma balcanica Krek, 1985^{c g}
- Pericoma bancrofti Tonnoir, 1920^{c g}
- Pericoma barbarica Vaillant, 1955^{c g}
- Pericoma barbata Satchell, 1954^{c g}
- Pericoma barremica Vaillant & Withers, 1993^{c g}
- Pericoma bavarica Wagner, 1981^{c g}
- Pericoma becharreense Wagner, 1980^{c g}
- Pericoma bessophila Quate, 1955^{i}
- Pericoma bifalcata Satchell, 1950^{c g}
- Pericoma bilobata Satchell, 1954^{c g}
- Pericoma bipunctata Kincaid, 1899^{i c g}
- Pericoma biramus Quate, 1955^{i c g}
- Pericoma blandula Eaton, 1893^{c g}
- Pericoma bosnica Krek, 1967^{c g}
- Pericoma brasilensis Duckhouse, 1968^{c g}
- Pericoma bunae Krek, 1979^{c g}
- Pericoma busckana (Dyar, 1926)^{c g}
- Pericoma calcifera Vaillant & Withers, 1993^{c g}
- Pericoma calcilega Feuerborn, 1923^{c g}
- Pericoma californica Kincaid, 1901^{i c g}
- Pericoma carolina Banks, 1931^{i c g}
- Pericoma chilensis Tonnoir, 1929^{c g}
- Pericoma chlifasica Vaillant & Moubayed, 1987^{c g}
- Pericoma clarkei Satchell, 1954^{c g}
- Pericoma claviatum Satchell, 1950^{c g}
- Pericoma coei Vaillant, 1965^{c g}
- Pericoma complexa Quate, 1955^{i c g}
- Pericoma complicata Tonnoir, 1929^{c g}
- Pericoma confusa Satchell, 1953^{c g}
- Pericoma consigilana Sara, 1953^{c g}
- Pericoma contigua Tonnoir, 1929^{c g}
- Pericoma coracina Duckhouse, 1966^{c g}
- Pericoma corsicana Vaillant, 1955^{c g}
- Pericoma crenophila Wagner & Schrankel, 2005^{c g}
- Pericoma deceptrix Quate & Brown, 2004^{c g}
- Pericoma decoricornis Tokunaga, 1961^{c g}
- Pericoma denticulatistylata Tokunaga & Kyoto, 1956^{c g}
- Pericoma diffusa Satchell, 1954^{c g}
- Pericoma diversa Tonnoir, 1919^{c g}
- Pericoma dlabolai Jezek, 1990^{c g}
- Pericoma drepanatum Satchell, 1950^{c g}
- Pericoma drepanopenis Duckhouse, 1975^{c g}
- Pericoma edwardsi Tonnoir, 1929^{c g}
- Pericoma egeica Vaillant, 1979^{c g}
- Pericoma equalis Tonnoir, 1934^{c g}
- Pericoma exquisita Eaton, 1893^{g}
- Pericoma exquista Eaton, 1893^{c g}
- Pericoma fallax Eaton, 1893^{c g}
- Pericoma fenestrata Tonnoir, 1929^{c g}
- Pericoma fluviatilis Dyar, 1926^{i c g}
- Pericoma fo-no Tokunaga, 1957^{g}
- Pericoma formosa Nielsen, 1964^{c g}
- Pericoma funebris Hutton, 1902^{c g}
- Pericoma gourlayi Satchell, 1950^{c g}
- Pericoma grabhamana (Dyar, 1926)^{c g}
- Pericoma gracecica Vaillant, 1978^{c g}
- Pericoma graecica Vaillant, 1978^{c g}
- Pericoma granadica Vaillant, 1978^{c g}
- Pericoma hakkariae Wagner, 1986^{c g}
- Pericoma hamtensis Kaul, 1971^{c g}
- Pericoma hansoni Quate, 1996^{c g}
- Pericoma hespenheidei Quate, 1996^{c g}
- Pericoma hiera Quate, 1955^{i c g}
- Pericoma hygropetrica Wagner, 1993^{c g}
- Pericoma illustrata Tonnoir, 1953^{c g}
- Pericoma improvisa Wagner & Baez, 1993^{c g}
- Pericoma incompleta (Knab, 1914)^{c g}
- Pericoma incrustans Vaillant, 1978^{c g}
- Pericoma inornata Tonnoir, 1929^{c g}
- Pericoma insularis Wagner & Salamanna, 1984^{c g}
- Pericoma intricatoria Tonnoir, 1953^{c g}
- Pericoma isabellae Wagner, 2005^{c g}
- Pericoma kabulica Wagner, 1979^{c g}
- Pericoma kariana Vaillant, 1978^{c g}
- Pericoma kincaidi Quate, 1955^{i}
- Pericoma kugleri Wagner, 1984^{c g}
- Pericoma lassenicalassenica Quate, 1955^{c g}
- Pericoma latina Sara, 1954^{c g}
- Pericoma limicola Vaillant, 1961^{c g}
- Pericoma litanica Vaillant & Moubayed, 1987^{c g}
- Pericoma ljubiliensis Krek, 1967^{c g}
- Pericoma lobisternum Satchell, 1950^{c g}
- Pericoma longicellata Tokunaga & Komyo, 1956^{c g}
- Pericoma longipennis Kaul, 1971^{c g}
- Pericoma ludificata Quate, 1955^{i c g}
- Pericoma maculosa Wagner, 1979^{c g}
- Pericoma marginalis (Banks, 1984)^{i c g}
- Pericoma margininotata Brunetti, 1908^{c g}
- Pericoma maroccana Vaillant, 1955^{c g}
- Pericoma maurum Satchell, 1950^{c g}
- Pericoma melanderi Quate, 1955^{i c g}
- Pericoma metatarsalis Brunetti, 1911^{c g}
- Pericoma mixta Brunetti, 1911^{c g}
- Pericoma modesta Tonnoir, 1922^{c g}
- Pericoma mollis (Satchell, 1955)^{c g}
- Pericoma motasi Vaillant, 1978^{c g}
- Pericoma multimaculata Satchell, 1950^{c g}
- Pericoma nemorosa Duckhouse, 1966^{c g}
- Pericoma neoblandula Duckhouse, 1962^{c g}
- Pericoma neretvana Krek, 1972^{g}
- Pericoma nielseni Kvifte, 2010^{g}
- Pericoma nigricauda (Tonnoir, 1919)^{c g}
- Pericoma nigropunctata (Schiner, 1868)^{c g}
- Pericoma niveopunctata Tonnoir, 1929^{c g}
- Pericoma notata Duckhouse, 1966^{c g}
- Pericoma orientalis Wagner, 1986^{c g}
- Pericoma ottwayensis Duckhouse, 1966^{c g}
- Pericoma paghmanica Wagner, 1979^{c g}
- Pericoma pallida Vaillant, 1978^{c g}
- Pericoma pallidula Tonnoir, 1929^{c g}
- Pericoma pannonica Szabo, 1960^{c g}
- Pericoma peregrinum Quate & Quate, 1967^{c g}
- Pericoma pericoma ^{i g}
- Pericoma pictipennis Tonnoir, 1920^{c g}
- Pericoma pingarestica Vaillant, 1978^{c g}
- Pericoma platystyla Wagner, 1986^{c g}
- Pericoma pseudoalbipes Satchell, 1953^{c g}
- Pericoma pseudocalcilega Krek, 1972^{c g}
- Pericoma pseudoexquisita Tonnoir, 1940^{c g}
- Pericoma punctulatum Tonnoir, 1953^{c g}
- Pericoma pyramidon Quate & Brown, 2004^{c g}
- Pericoma remulum Quate & Brown, 2004^{c g}
- Pericoma restonicana Vaillant, 1978^{c g}
- Pericoma reticulatipennis Tokunaga & Komyo, 1956^{c g}
- Pericoma rivularis Berden, 1954^{c g}
- Pericoma rotundipennis Tonnoir, 1953^{c g}
- Pericoma salfii (Sara, 1951)^{c g}
- Pericoma sasakawai Tokunaga et Komyo, 1955^{c g}
- Pericoma satchell Duckhouse, 1966^{c g}
- Pericoma schumanni Jezek, 1994^{c g}
- Pericoma scotiae (Curran, 1924)^{i c g}
- Pericoma segregata Vaillant, 1978^{c g}
- Pericoma serratipenis Satchell, 1950^{c g}
- Pericoma servadeii Salamanna, 1982^{c g}
- Pericoma shikokuensis Tokunaga et Komyo, 1955^{c g}
- Pericoma sicula Quate, 1955^{i c g}
- Pericoma signata (Banks, 1901)^{i c g b}
- Pericoma simplex Tonnoir, 1929^{c g}
- Pericoma simulata Duckhouse, 1966^{c g}
- Pericoma singularis Quate, 1962^{c g}
- Pericoma sinica Wagner, 2003^{c g}
- Pericoma sitchana Kincaid, 1899^{i c g}
- Pericoma slossonae (Williston, 1893)^{i c g}
- Pericoma solangensis Kaul, 1971^{c g}
- Pericoma soleata (Haliday, 1856)^{c g}
- Pericoma solitaria Wagner & Salamanna, 1984^{c g}
- Pericoma solitarium Satchell, 1954^{c g}
- Pericoma spiralifera Satchell, 1950^{c g}
- Pericoma squamitarsis Tonnoir, 1929^{c g}
- Pericoma steffani Quate & Quate, 1967^{c g}
- Pericoma stuckenbergi Duckhouse, 1975^{c g}
- Pericoma subillustrata Tonnoir, 1953^{c g}
- Pericoma symphylia Quate, 1999^{c g}
- Pericoma tasmaniae Tonnoir, 1953^{c g}
- Pericoma tatrica Szabo, 1960^{c g}
- Pericoma taurica Jezek, 1990^{c g}
- Pericoma tenerifensis Satchell, 1955^{c g}
- Pericoma tenuistylis Vaillant, 1978^{c g}
- Pericoma tienshanensis Jezek, 1994^{c g}
- Pericoma tonnoiri Vaillant, 1978^{c g}
- Pericoma tricolor (Knab, 1914)^{c g}
- Pericoma trifasciata (Meigen, 1818)^{c g}
- Pericoma triuncinatum Satchell, 1950^{c g}
- Pericoma truncata Kincaid, 1899^{i c g}
- Pericoma uniformatum Tonnoir, 1953^{c g}
- Pericoma usingeri Quate, 1955^{i c g}
- Pericoma vestita Vaillant & Withers, 1993^{c g}
- Pericoma viduata Tonnoir, 1929^{c g}
- Pericoma viperina Vaillant, 1961^{c g}
- Pericoma volpina Vaillant, 1978^{c g}
- Pericoma wirthi Quate, 1955^{i}
- Pericoma zumbadoi Quate, 1996^{c g}

Data sources: i = ITIS, c = Catalogue of Life, g = GBIF, b = Bugguide.net
