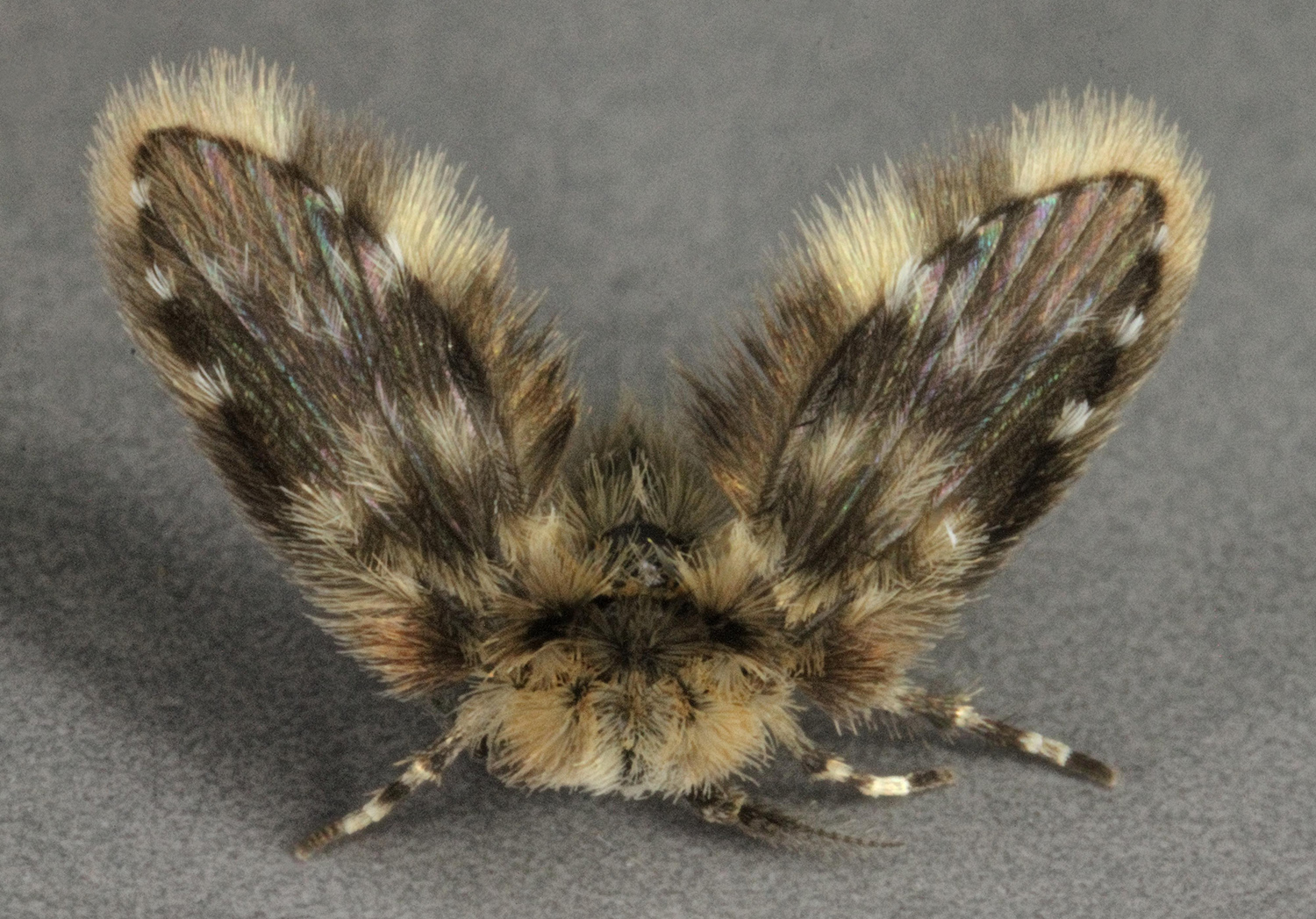
- Clytocerus ocellaris agg. North Wales

Scientific classification
- Kingdom: Animalia
- Phylum: Arthropoda
- Clade: Pancrustacea
- Class: Insecta
- Order: Diptera
- Family: Psychodidae
- Genus: Clytocerus
- Species: C. ocellaris

Binomial name
- Clytocerus ocellaris (Meigen, 1818)

Synonyms
- Boreoclytocerus ocellaris (Meigen, 1804); Trichoptera ocellaris Meigen, 1804; Boreoclytocerus ocellaris (Meigen, 1818); Clytocerus (Boreoclytocerus) ocellaris (Meigen, 1818); Psychoda ocellaris Meigen, 1818

= Clytocerus ocellaris =

Species of fly

Clytocerus ocellaris is a species of fly in the family Psychodidae. It is found in the Palearctic.
