= Pericoma signata =

Scientific classification
- Kingdom: Animalia
- Phylum: Arthropoda
- Clade: Pancrustacea
- Class: Insecta
- Order: Diptera
- Family: Psychodidae
- Tribe: Pericomini
- Genus: Pericoma
- Species: P. signata

Binomial name
- Pericoma signata (Banks, 1901)

Synonyms
- Psychoda megantica Curran, 1924; Psychoda signata Banks, 1901

Species of fly

Pericoma signata is a species of moth fly in the family Psychodidae. It is found in eastern North America.

The length of the wing is 2 mm (0.079 in).
