= Clytocerus =

Scientific classification
- Kingdom: Animalia
- Phylum: Arthropoda
- Class: Insecta
- Order: Diptera
- Family: Psychodidae
- Genus: Clytocerus; Eaton, 1904

Synonyms
- Synseodais Enderlein, 1937

Genus of flies

Clytocerus is a genus of flies belonging to the family Psychodidae.

The genus was first described by Eaton in 1904.

The species of this genus are found in Europe and Southern Africa.

Species include:

- Clytocerus americanus
- Clytocerus ocellaris
- Clytocerus tetracorniculatus
