= Clytocerus americanus =

Scientific classification
- Domain: Eukaryota
- Kingdom: Animalia
- Phylum: Arthropoda
- Class: Insecta
- Order: Diptera
- Family: Psychodidae
- Genus: Clytocerus
- Species: C. americanus

Binomial name
- Clytocerus americanus (Kincaid, 1901)

Synonyms
- Clytocerus (Boreoclytocerus) americanus; Pericoma ocellaris var. americana; Pericoma interrupta (Banks, 1906); Pericoma americana (Dyar, 1927); Pericoma satellitia (Dyar, 1927)

Species of fly

Clytocerus americanus is a species of moth fly belonging to the family Psychodidae.

== Physical description ==
=== Larva ===
The larvae have two prominent, horn-like projections situated in front and to the side of their head. They have hard tergites, underdeveloped sternites, and inconspicuous respiratory fans.

=== Pupa ===
The pupa have pinna on the apex of their respiratory horn. They have paired spines posteriorly and laterally on their anal division, the lateral spines are serrated along both the anterior and lateral margins.

=== Adult ===
In males, their eye bridge has three facet rows, divided by a width of 2 facet diameters. The suture situated between their eyes has a faint inverted U-shaped, with no corniculi. The area around the male terminalia (genitalia) consists of a posteriorly rounded hypandrium (the area underlying the genitalia) and 12–15 retinacula on each surstylus.

The female terminalia consists of a bilobed subgenital plate the posterior margin of which is broadly V-shaped.

== Biology ==
There is limited information on the natural history of most species within the genus Clytocerus.

Their diet mainly consists of fungal mycelia and various microorganisms which inhabit wet to moist environments. Larvae are assumed to be detritivores. They are normally nocturnal and can be seen crowding lights in the evening. Adults in greatest numbers between June and August

== Distribution ==
Clytocerus americanus is the only Nearctic species of the genus Clytocerus. They can be found throughout the eastern United States, but have also been found as far west as California and as far north as Ontario.

== Habitat ==
They can be found in organically rich, semi aquatic habitats. They spend much of their time resting on vegetation in perpetually moist or marginal habitats, such as woodland streams or springs.
