= Pericoma =

Scientific classification
- Kingdom: Animalia
- Phylum: Arthropoda
- Class: Insecta
- Order: Diptera
- Family: Psychodidae
- Tribe: Pericomini
- Genus: Pericoma; Haliday in Walker, 1856

Diversity
- About 159 species

Genus of flies

Pericoma is a genus of moth flies, family Psychodidae. There are about 159 recognized species in Pericoma in four subgenera:

- Pericoma (Pericoma) Haliday, 1856
- Pericoma (Botosaneanuiella) Vaillant, 1978
- Pericoma (Pachypericoma) Vaillant, 1978
- Pericoma (Vaillantiella) Krek, 1983

Pericoma has a nearly cosmopolitan distribution.

== See also ==
- List of Pericoma species
