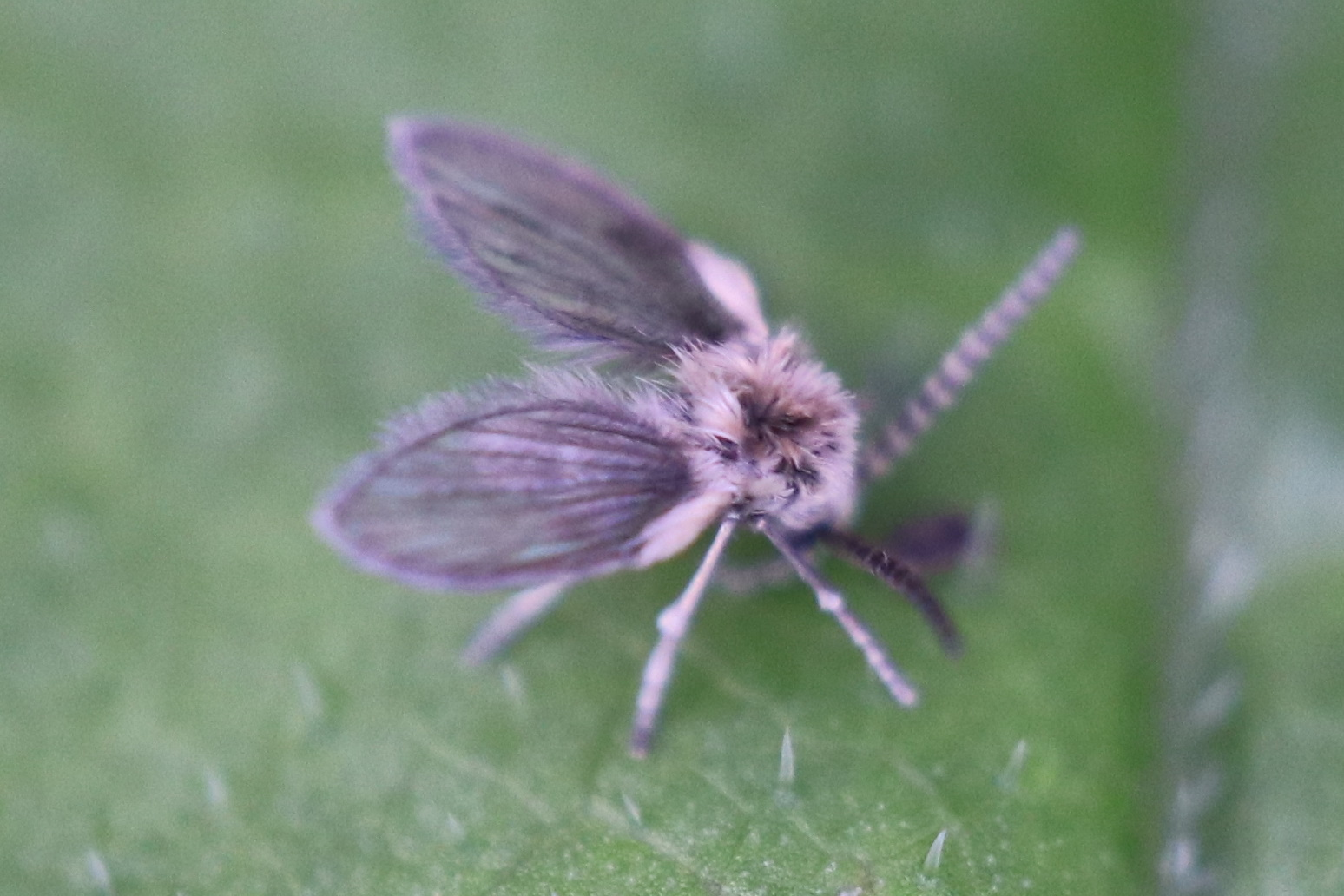
- Philosepedon humeralis

Scientific classification
- Kingdom: Animalia
- Phylum: Arthropoda
- Class: Insecta
- Order: Diptera
- Family: Psychodidae
- Subfamily: Psychodinae
- Tribe: Paramormiini
- Genus: Philosepedon; Eaton, 1904

Type species
- Psychoda humeralis Meigen, 1818

= Philosepedon =

Genus of flies

Philosepedon is a genus of flies belonging to the family Psychodidae.

== Distribution ==
The species of this genus are found in Europe, Asia and America.

== Species ==
- Philosepedon africanus Wagner, 1979
- Philosepedon aliciae Ibáñez-Bernal, 2005
- Philosepedon apozonallii Stebner & Solórzano-Kraemer, 2014
- Philosepedon arabicum Ježek & Harten, 2002
- Philosepedon atopos Quate, 1996
- Philosepedon atschitaricus Vaillant & Joost, 1983
- Philosepedon austriacus Vaillant, 1974
- Philosepedon balinsasayae Quate, 1965
- Philosepedon balkanicus Krek, 1970
- Philosepedon beaucornui Vaillant, 1974
- Philosepedon bicalcaratus Quate, 1996
- Philosepedon calabens Quate, 1965
- Philosepedon carpaticus Vaillant, 1974
- Philosepedon clouensis Ježek, 1994
- Philosepedon deceptrix Quate, 1996
- Philosepedon decipiens Quate, 1965
- Philosepedon dimorphus Quate, 1996
- Philosepedon duacopis Quate, 1999
- Philosepedon dumosum Omelková & Ježek, 2012
- Philosepedon ensiger Quate, 1996
- Philosepedon forcipata Quate & Quate, 1967
- Philosepedon fratruelis Quate, 1962
- Philosepedon frontalis Quate, 1965
- Philosepedon hrudkai Ježek, 1999
- Philosepedon humeralis (Meigen, 1818)
- Philosepedon ibericus Vaillant, 1974
- Philosepedon kalehnus Vaillant, 1974
- Philosepedon katangladensis Quate, 1965
- Philosepedon kowarzi Ježek, 1995
- Philosepedon labecula Quate, 1963
- Philosepedon longistylus Quate, 1996
- Philosepedon majorinus Quate, 1996
- Philosepedon mauroae Wagner & Masteller, 1996
- Philosepedon memnonius Quate, 1966
- Philosepedon mexicana Quate, 1963
- Philosepedon monstruosus Ježek & Mogi, 1995
- Philosepedon mutabilis Quate, 1965
- Philosepedon neretvanicus Krek, 1976
- Philosepedon nickerli Ježek, 1995
- Philosepedon nocturnalis Quate, 1965
- Philosepedon occidentalis Krek, 1976
- Philosepedon operosa Quate, 1962
- Philosepedon orientale Krek, 1977
- Philosepedon orientalis Wagner, 1981
- Philosepedon parciproma Quate, 1962
- Philosepedon parifurcus Quate, 1996
- Philosepedon pectinata Quate & Quate, 1967
- Philosepedon perdecorum Omelková & Ježek, 2012
- Philosepedon pragensis Ježek, 1995
- Philosepedon primoryanus Wagner, 1994
- Philosepedon provincialis Vaillant, 1974
- Philosepedon pudica Quate, 1962
- Philosepedon pyrenaicus Vaillant, 1974
- Philosepedon quadricuspis Quate & Quate, 1967
- Philosepedon quatei Vaillant, 1973
- Philosepedon sakhalinus Wagner, 1994
- Philosepedon sandalioticus Salamanna, 1982
- Philosepedon scutigerus Vaillant, 1963
- Philosepedon sessilis Quate & Quate, 1967
- Philosepedon setosa Quate & Quate, 1967
- Philosepedon soljani Krek, 1971
- Philosepedon symmetricus Wagner, 1986
- Philosepedon tetartos Quate, 1996
- Philosepedon torosa Quate & Quate, 1967
- Philosepedon tripetalis Quate, 1996
- Philosepedon tritaxis Quate, 1996
- Philosepedon tritenaculus Quate, 1996
- Philosepedon triungulata Eaton, 1913
- Philosepedon wagneri Omelková & Ježek, 2012
