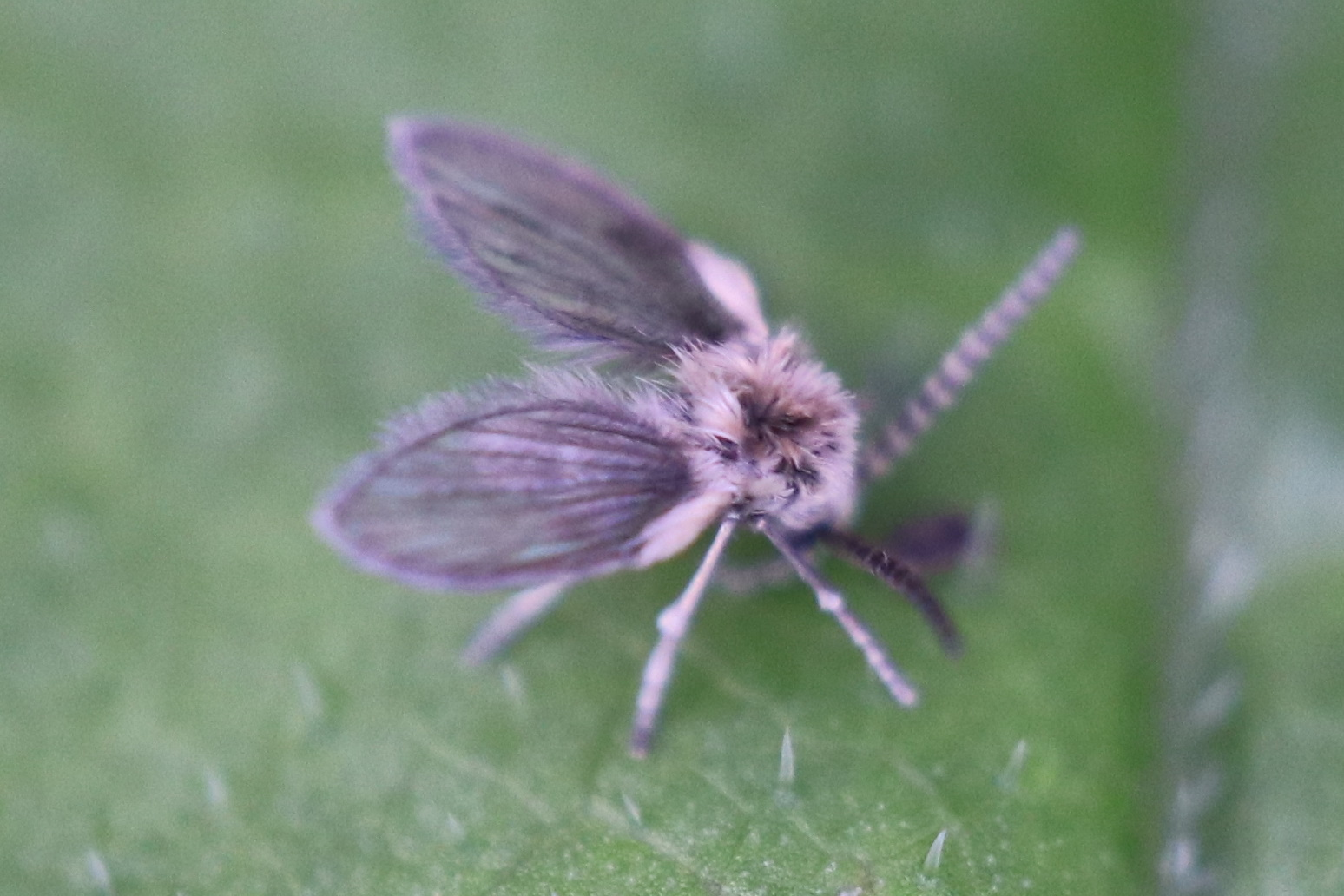
- Philosepedon humeralis

Scientific classification
- Kingdom: Animalia
- Phylum: Arthropoda
- Class: Insecta
- Order: Diptera
- Family: Psychodidae
- Subfamily: Psychodinae
- Tribe: Paramormiini
- Genus: Philosepedon
- Species: P. humeralis

Binomial name
- Philosepedon humeralis (Meigen, 1818)

Synonyms
- Psychoda humeralis Meigen, 1818

= Philosepedon humeralis =

Species of moth fly, the drain fly

Philosepedon humeralis is a species of moth fly in the family Psychodidae

== Distribution ==
Europe.
