= Jiji railway station =

Railway station in Nantou County, Taiwan

Coordinates: 23.826179°N 120.785104°E

Jiji Train Station 集集火車站
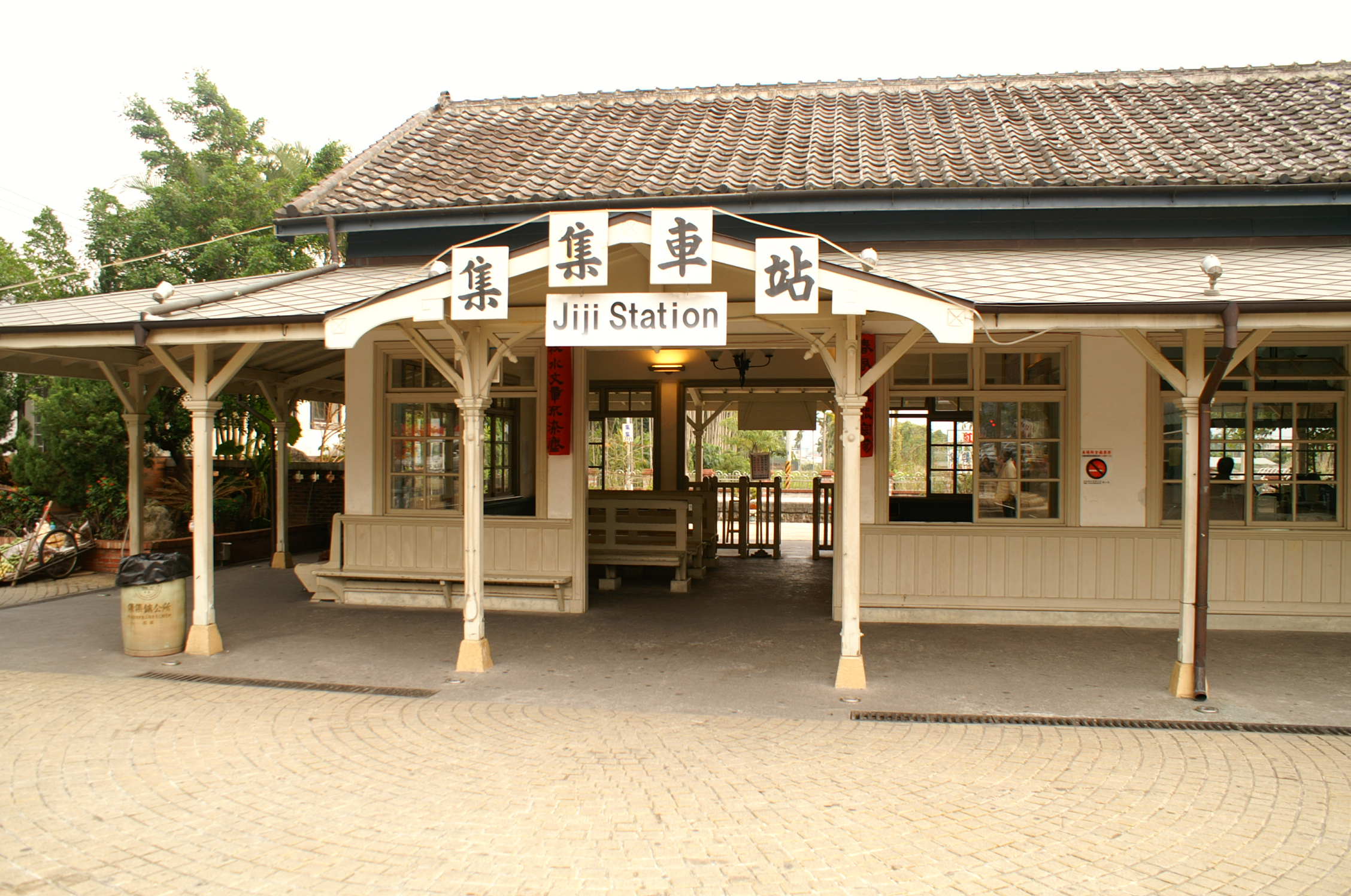

General information
- Location: 75, Minsheng Rd. Jiji, Nantou County; Taiwan
- Operated by: Taiwan Railway Corporation
- Line: Jiji line (254)
- Distance: 20.1 km from Ershui
- Platforms: 1 island platform

Construction
- Structure type: Ground level

Other information
- Classification: 簡易站 (Taiwan Railways Administration level)

History
- Opened: 14 January 1922

Passengers
- 238 daily (2024)

Services
Preceding station	Taiwan Railway	Following station
Longquan towards Ershui	Jiji line	Shuili towards Checheng
Location

Jiji (Chinese: 集集火車站; pinyin: Jíjí Huǒchēzhàn) is a railway station in Jiji Township, Nantou County, Taiwan. It lies along the Taiwan Railway-operated Jiji line, the longest branch line in Taiwan. The station is registered as a historic building, preserving Japanese-style architecture. It is now a tourist destination supported by the Jiji town office.

The Jiji line, including Jiji station, was opened in 1922 to bring construction materials to a power plant at Sun Moon Lake. It soon began carrying wood and agricultural produce, as well as passengers. The initial station was too small for its expanding use, so a new station building made of cypress was completed in 1933. Proposals to shut down the line in 1986 were opposed by local residents, and the line rebranded in 1994 as a tourist railway. The 1999 Jiji earthquake heavily damaged the station, but it was rebuilt in the same style and re-opened in 2001.

== Location ==
The station is located at No.75, Minsheng Rd., Jiji Township, Nantou County, Taiwan. It is part of the Jiji line, which is the longest branch line in Taiwan.

== Structure ==
The station building is made of cypress wood, and is one of the few remaining Japanese-style station buildings in Taiwan. It has a very simple facade. Tiles were added to the roof following reconstruction after the 1999 Jiji earthquake. The floor is made of cement. The station building is classified as a historic building under the Cultural Heritage Preservation Act by the Bureau of Cultural Heritage, considered to have both historical and cultural value. It is registered as a historic site under the Nantou County government. Although it remains owned by the Taiwan Railway Corporation, the station and wider Jiji line are maintained and operated by the Jiji town office. The interior retains a pre-war telephone and safe.

== History ==
Jiji station was constructed by the Taiwan Electric Power Co. during Japanese rule, with construction beginning per local knowledge in 1916, but in official documents in 1919. Jiji sat roughly in the middle of the line, and served as the capital of its county within the Taichū Prefecture. The station, along with the rest of the Jiji line, started operation on 15 January 1922. Its initial purpose was for transporting materials to the nearby power plant at Sun Moon Lake. Later it was also used to transport wood, including from Mount Xiluanda and Mount Danda, as well as agricultural produce grown near the train line, including bananas and other fruit, rice, camphor, and sugar. It also began to transport passengers, with trains consisting of one goods car and one passenger car. In 1927 parts of the railway were sold to the Japanese government. The arrival of the Jiji line increased economic growth within the area, allowing for much greater goods transport. Bananas grown in the region were collected in Jiji for onward export, with this activity reaching its peak in 1930.

Increasing usage outgrew the capacity of the original station. The station relocated to its current location on 2 February 1930, and building began on what was at the time a common Japanese train station design. The new station was built from cypress, and was finished in 1933.

In 1986, the Taiwan Railways Administration announced it intended to close the loss-making Jiji line. This was opposed by locals. Starting from 1994, the Taiwan Railways Administration and the town cooperated to repaint the line's trains with the aim of attracting tourists. The town funded improvements, including the addition of a parking lot.

The station was severely damaged in the 1999 Jiji earthquake (921 earthquake). It was rebuilt, finishing on 7 February 2001. While only 7% of the building material could be reused, blueprints from its initial construction were available. The station building was reconstructed faithfully to the original one, and became a tourist attraction. The reconstruction did, however, add 12 steel bars to the wooden construction, to enhance earthquake resistance. It is designed to withstand a magnitude 7 earthquake. The new roof tiles were taken from a building near Ershui railway station that was slated for demolition, allowing for them to authentically reflect the originals.

On 14 January 2022, the 100th anniversary of the station was celebrated, attracting rail enthusiasts from throughout the country. The station adopted the stray cat Longjiaosun as its station master. In attendance was the town mayor, as well as Mikan, the cat station master of Ciaotou Sugar Refinery metro station in Kaohsiung. 1,000 commemorative tickets were produced for the anniversary, and all were sold within an hour. Due to upcoming renovations to the station that would change the purpose of some of its rooms, Longjiaosun was laid off after 11 June 2023.

In May 2024 much of the Jiji line, including Jiji station, was closed for tunnel expansions. During this period, an inflatable leopard cat was erected outside the station, to welcome guests while highlighting a species found in the local area. The station is expected to reopen in late 2025.

== Around the station ==
The station now serves as an important tourist site for the town, with nearby stores selling dried fruit. An old steam locomotive is kept next to the station, as is an old tank donated by the Ministry of National Defense.

- Jiji Military History Park
- Jiji Weir
- Mingxin Academy

== See also ==
- List of railway and metro stations in Taiwan
