= Jiji =

Jiji may refer to:

== People ==
- Jiji people, an ethnolinguistic group in western Tanzania
- Li Jiji (died 926), imperial prince of the Chinese Five Dynasties and Ten Kingdoms
- Jamshed Jiji Irani (born 1936), Indian industrialist
- Jiji P Joseph (born 1981), Indian film audio engineer

== Fictional characters ==
- Jiji, character in Kiki's Delivery Service
- Jiji, character in the puzzle game Baba Is You

== Other uses ==
- Jiji, Nantou, a township in Taiwan
  - Jiji railway station, a railway station serving Jiji
  - Jiji Line, a railway line serving Jiji
- Jiji Press, a Japanese news agency
- Jiji.ng, a Nigerian online marketplace

== See also ==
- 1999 Jiji earthquake, an earthquake that occurred in Jiji, Nantou
