= Taichū Prefecture =

Prefecture of Taiwan under Japanese rule

Taichū Prefecture 台中州 (臺中州)
- Taichū-shū
- 1920–1952
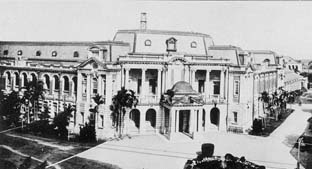
- The Taichū Prefecture government building now serves as the Taichung city government building.
- Capital: Taichung
- Population
  - 1941: 1,380,187
- Historical era: Taiwan under Japanese rule
  - Established: 1920
  - Disestablished: 25 October 1945
  - Treaty of San Francisco: 28 April 1952
- Political subdivisions: 2 cities (市); 11 district (郡)
- Today part of: Taichung, Changhua County, Nantou County

Taichū Prefecture (1925)

Taichū Prefecture (台中州, Taichū-shū) was one of the administrative divisions of Japanese Taiwan. The prefecture consisted of modern-day Taichung City, Changhua County and Nantou County. It is also the origin of the name of modern-day Taichung. The Taichū Prefecture was the scene of the 1930 Musha Incident, the last major uprising against colonial Japanese forces in Japanese Taiwan.

== Population ==
Population statistics of permanent residents in Taichū Prefecture in 1941:

Total population	1,380,187
Japanese	46,371
Taiwanese	1,329,620
Koreans	333
1941 (Showa 16) census.

== Administrative divisions ==
=== Cities and Districts ===
In 1945 (Shōwa 20), there were 2 cities and 11 districts.

Cities (市 shi)			Districts (郡 gun)		
Name	Kanji	Kana	Name	Kanji	Kana
Taichū City	台中市	たいちゅうし	Daiton District	大屯郡	だいとんぐん
Taichū City	台中市	たいちゅうし	Toyohara District	豐原郡	とよはらぐん
Taichū City	台中市	たいちゅうし	Tōsei District	東勢郡	とうせいぐん
Taichū City	台中市	たいちゅうし	Taikō District	大甲郡	たいこうぐん
Shōka City	彰化市	しょうかし	Shōka District	彰化郡	しょうかぐん
Shōka City	彰化市	しょうかし	Inrin District	員林郡	いんりんぐん
Shōka City	彰化市	しょうかし	Hokuto District	北斗郡	ほくとぐん
Shōka City	彰化市	しょうかし	Nantō District	南投郡	なんとうぐん
Shōka City	彰化市	しょうかし	Niitaka District	新高郡	にいたかぐん
Shōka City	彰化市	しょうかし	Nōkō District	能高郡	のうこうぐん
Shōka City	彰化市	しょうかし	Takeyama District	竹山郡	たけやまぐん

=== Towns and Villages ===
The districts are divided into towns (街) and villages (庄)

District	Name	Kanji	Notes
Daiton 大屯郡	Ōsato village	大里庄	Today Dali District
Daiton 大屯郡	Muhō village	霧峰庄	Today Wufeng District
Daiton 大屯郡	Taihei village	太平庄	Today Taiping District
Daiton 大屯郡	Hokuton village	北屯庄	Today Beitun District
Daiton 大屯郡	Seiton village	西屯庄	Today Xitun District
Daiton 大屯郡	Nanton village	南屯庄	Today Nantun District
Daiton 大屯郡	Ujitsu village	烏日庄	Today Wuri District
Toyohara 豐原郡	Toyohara town	豐原街	Today Fengyuan District
Toyohara 豐原郡	Kamioka village	神岡庄	Today Shengang District
Toyohara 豐原郡	Daiga village	大雅庄	Today Daya District
Toyohara 豐原郡	Naiho village	內埔庄	Today Houli District
Toyohara 豐原郡	Tanshi village	潭子庄	Today Tanzi District
Tōsei 東勢郡	Tōsei town	東勢街	Today Dongshi District
Tōsei 東勢郡	Ishioka village	石岡庄	Today Shigang District
Tōsei 東勢郡	Shinsha village	新社庄	Today Xinshe District
Tōsei 東勢郡	Aboriginal Area	蕃地	Today Heping District
Taikō 大甲郡	Taikō town	大甲街	Today Dajia District
Taikō 大甲郡	Kiyomizu town	清水街	Today Qingshui District
Taikō 大甲郡	Gosei town	梧棲街	Today Wuqi District
Taikō 大甲郡	Gaiho village	外埔庄	Today Waipu District
Taikō 大甲郡	Daian village	大安庄	Today Da'an District
Taikō 大甲郡	Sharoku village	沙鹿庄	Today Shalu District
Taikō 大甲郡	Tatsui village	龍井庄	Today Longjing District
Taikō 大甲郡	Taito village	大肚庄	Today Dadu District
Shōka 彰化郡	Rokkō town	鹿港街	Today Lukang Township
Shōka 彰化郡	Wabi town	和美街	Today Hemei Township
Shōka 彰化郡	Sensai village	線西庄	Today Xianxi Township and Shengang Township
Shōka 彰化郡	Fukkō village	福興庄	Today Fuxing Township
Shōka 彰化郡	Shūsui village	秀水庄	Today Xiushui Township
Shōka 彰化郡	Kadan village	花壇庄	Today Huatan Township
Shōka 彰化郡	Fun'en village	芬園庄	Today Fenyuan Township
Shōka 彰化郡	Shōka town	彰化街	Upgraded to a city in 1933. Today Changhua City
Shōka 彰化郡	Ōtake village	大竹庄	Abolished in 1933, annexed into Shōka City
Shōka 彰化郡	Nankaku village	南郭庄	Abolished in 1933, annexed into Shōka City
Inrin 員林郡	Inrin town	員林街	Today Yuanlin Township
Inrin 員林郡	Keiko town	溪湖街	Today Xihu Township
Inrin 員林郡	Tanaka town	田中街	Today Tianzhong Township
Inrin 員林郡	Ōmura village	大村庄	Today Dacun Township
Inrin 員林郡	Hoen village	埔鹽庄	Today Puyan Township
Inrin 員林郡	Hashin village	坡心庄	Today Puxin Township
Inrin 員林郡	Eisei village	永靖庄	Today Yongjing Township
Inrin 員林郡	Shatō village	社頭庄	Today Shetou Township
Inrin 員林郡	Nisui village	二水庄	Today Ershui Township
Hokuto 北斗郡	Hokuto town	北斗街	Today Yuanlin Township
Hokuto 北斗郡	Jirin town	二林街	Today Erlin Township
Hokuto 北斗郡	Tao village	田尾庄	Today Tianwei Township
Hokuto 北斗郡	Hitō village	埤頭庄	Today Pitou Township
Hokuto 北斗郡	Sunayama village	沙山庄	Today Fangyuan Township
Hokuto 北斗郡	Ōshiro village	大城庄	Today Dacheng Township
Hokuto 北斗郡	Chikutō village	竹塘庄	Today Zhutang Township
Hokuto 北斗郡	Keishū village	溪州庄	Today Xizhou Township
Nantō 南投郡	Nantō town	南投街	Today Nantou City
Nantō 南投郡	Sōton town	草屯街	Today Caotun Township
Nantō 南投郡	Chūryō village	中寮庄	Today Zhongliao Township
Nantō 南投郡	Nama village	名間庄	Today Mingjian Township
Niitaka 新高郡	Shūshū town	集集街	Today Jiji Township and Shuili Township
Niitaka 新高郡	Gyochi village	魚池庄	Today Yuchi Township
Niitaka 新高郡	Aboriginal Area	蕃地	Today Xinyi Township
Nōkō 能高郡	Hori town	埔里街	Today Puli Township
Nōkō 能高郡	Kokusei village	國姓庄	Today Guoxing Township
Nōkō 能高郡	Aboriginal Area	蕃地	Today Ren'ai Township
Takeyama 竹山郡	Takeyama town	竹山街	Today Zhushan Township
Takeyama 竹山郡	Shikatani village	鹿谷庄	Today Lugu Township

== See also ==
- Political divisions of Taiwan (1895–1945)
- Governor-General of Taiwan
- Taiwan under Japanese rule
- Administrative divisions of the Republic of China
