= Longquan railway station =

Railway station in Jiji, Nantou County, Taiwan

Longquan Station 龍泉車站
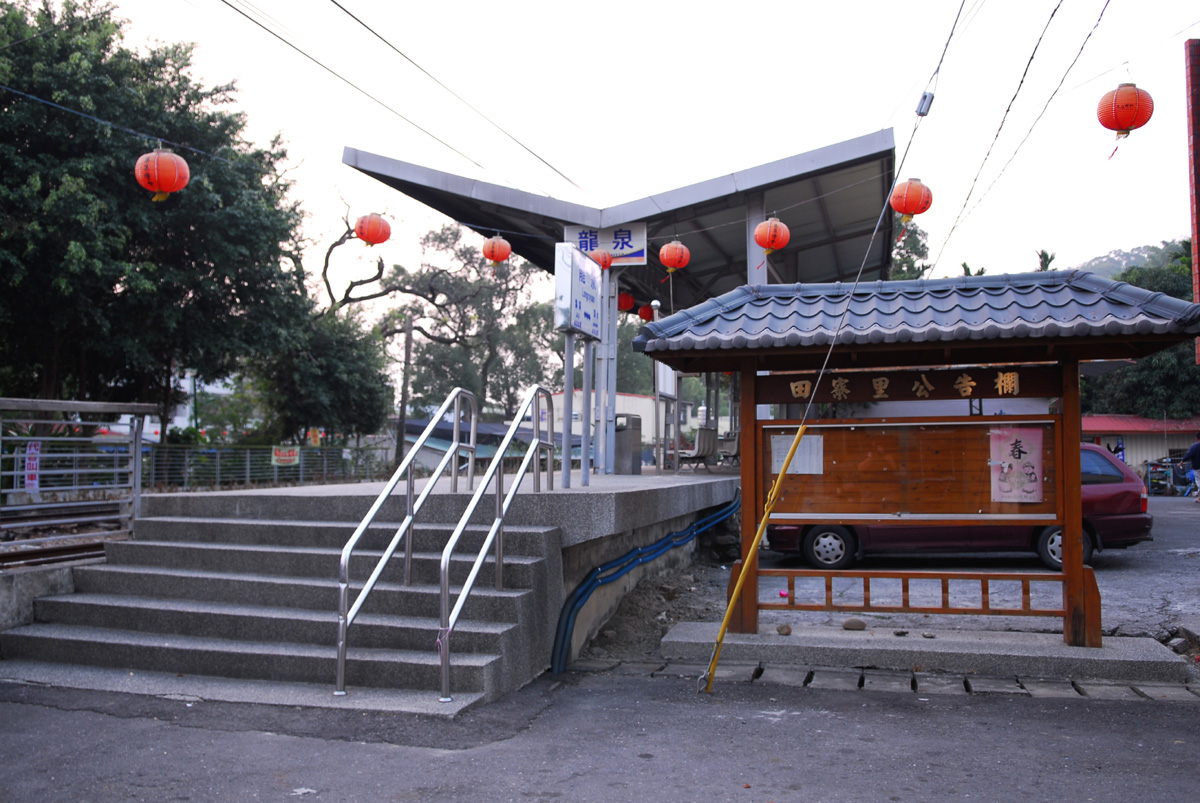

General information
- Location: Jiji, Nantou County, Taiwan
- Coordinates: 23.835189°N 120.750398°E
- System: Train station
- Owner: Taiwan Railway Corporation
- Operator: Taiwan Railway Corporation
- Line: Jiji
- Train operators: Taiwan Railway Corporation

History
- Opened: 14 January 1922

Passengers
- 25 daily (2024)

Services
Preceding station	Taiwan Railway	Following station
Zhuoshui towards Ershui	Jiji line	Jiji towards Checheng
Location

Longquan (traditional Chinese: 龍泉車站; simplified Chinese: 龙泉车站; pinyin: Lóngquán Chēzhàn) is a railway station on Taiwan Railway Jiji line located in Jiji Township, Nantou County, Taiwan.

== History ==
The station was opened for operation on 14 January 1922.

== See also ==
- List of railway stations in Taiwan
