= Zhuoshui railway station =

Railway station in Taiwan

Zhuoshui Station 濁水車站
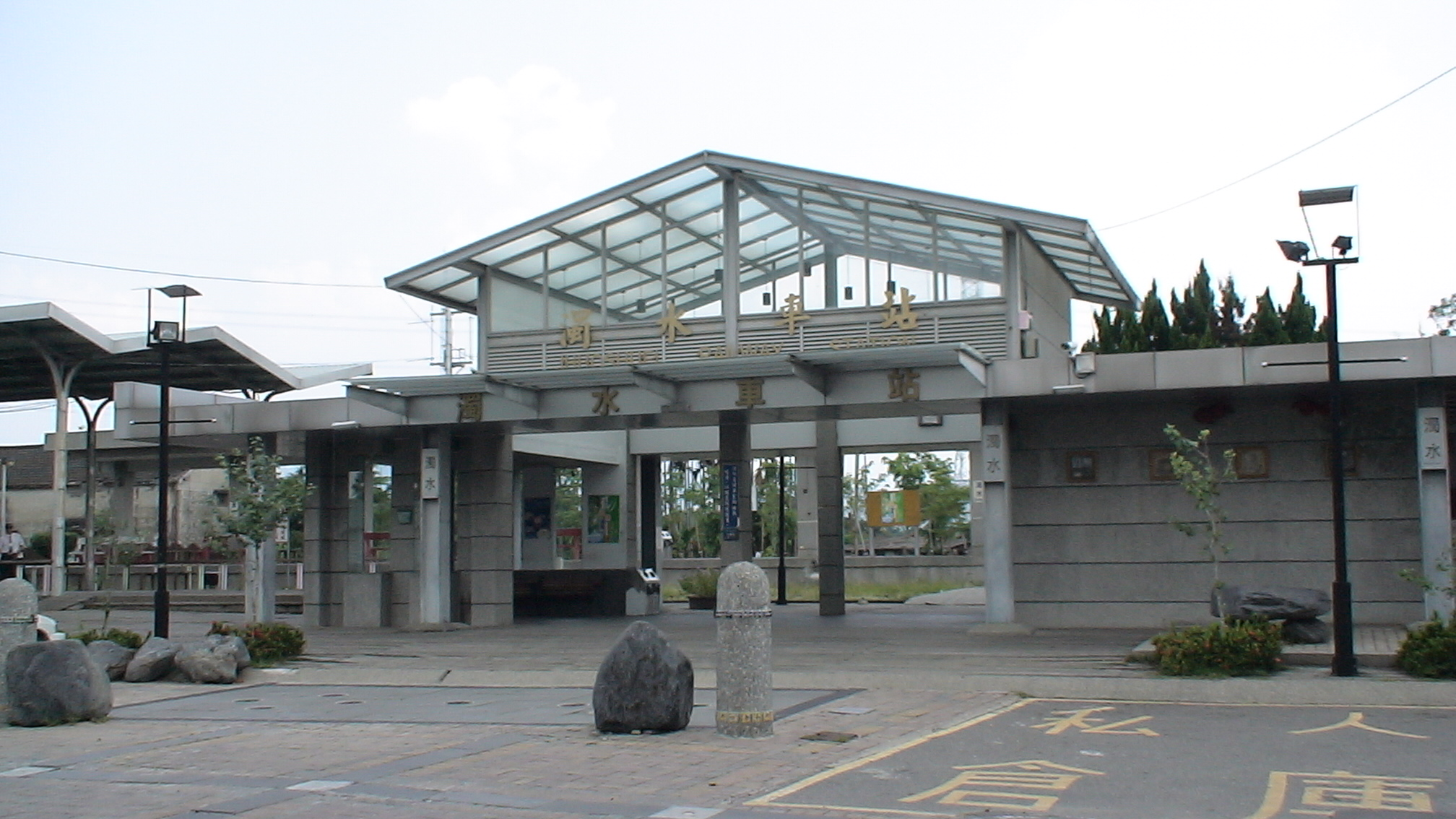

General information
- Location: Mingjian, Nantou County, Taiwan
- Coordinates: 23°50′4.91″N 120°42′19.13″E
- System: Train station
- Owner: Taiwan Railway Corporation
- Operator: Taiwan Railway Corporation
- Line: Jiji
- Train operators: Taiwan Railway Corporation

History
- Opened: 14 January 1922

Services
Preceding station	Taiwan Railway	Following station
Yuanquan towards Ershui	Jiji line	Longquan towards Checheng
Location

Zhuoshui (Chinese: 濁水車站; Hanyu Pinyin: Zhuóshuǐ Chēzhàn; Tongyong Pinyin: Jhuóshuěi Chejhàn) is a railway station on Taiwan Railway Jiji line located in Mingjian Township, Nantou County, Taiwan.

== History ==
The station was opened on 14 January 1922.

== See also ==
- List of railway stations in Taiwan
