= Yuanquan railway station =

Railway station in Ershui, Changhua County, Taiwan

Yuanquan Station 源泉車站
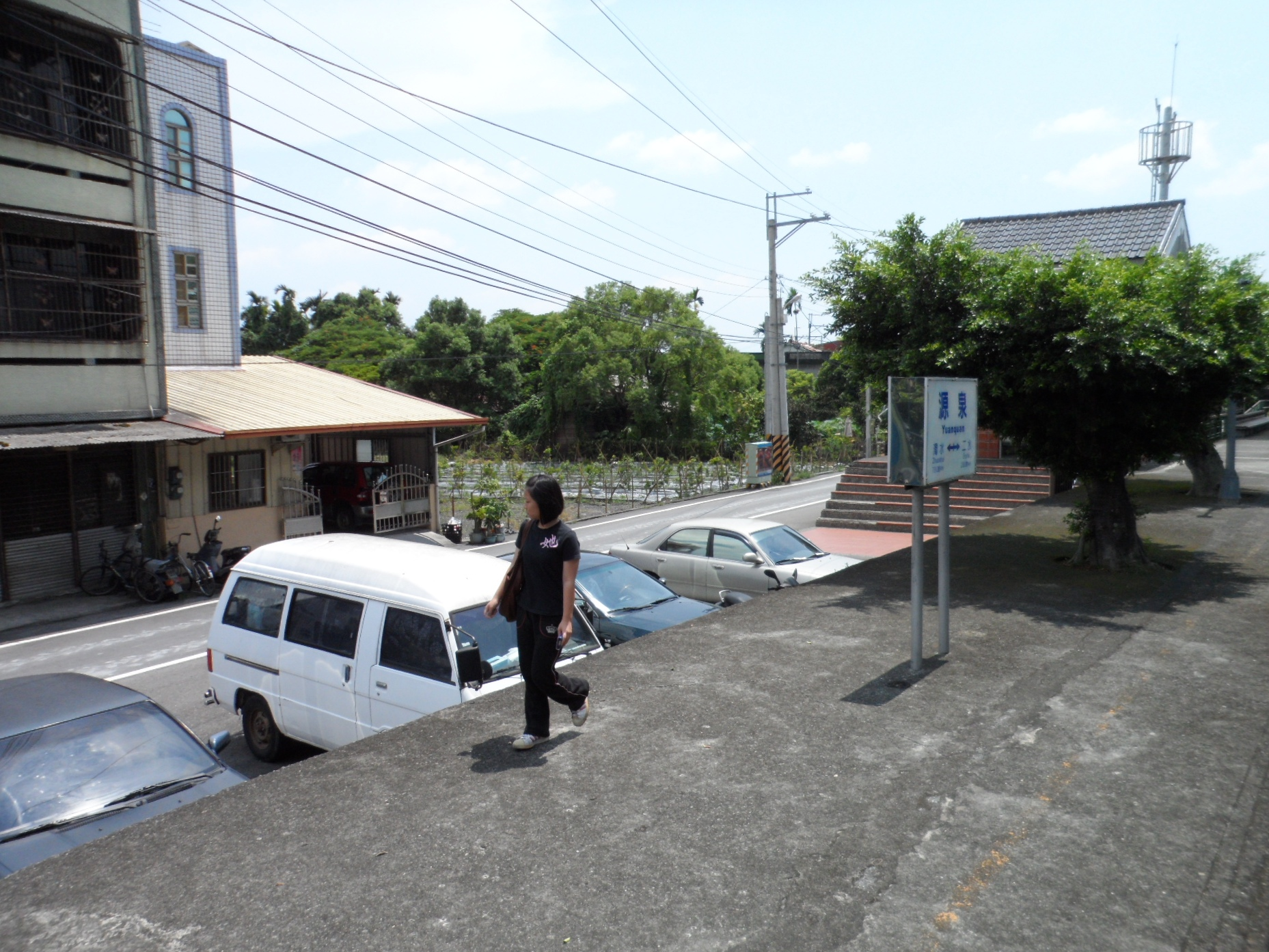

General information
- Location: Ershui, Changhua County, Taiwan
- Coordinates: 23°47′55.01″N 120°38′32.44″E
- System: Railway station
- Owner: Taiwan Railway Corporation
- Operator: Taiwan Railway Corporation
- Line: Jiji
- Train operators: Taiwan Railway Corporation

History
- Opened: 14 January 1922

Passengers
- 78 daily (2024)

Services
Preceding station	Taiwan Railway	Following station
Ershui Terminus	Jiji line	Zhuoshui towards Checheng
Location

Yuanquan (Chinese: 源泉車站; Hanyu Pinyin: Yuánquán Chēzhàn; Tongyong Pinyin: Yuáncyuán Chejhàn) is a railway station on Taiwan Railway Jiji line located in Ershui Township, Changhua County, Taiwan.

== History ==
The station was opened on 14 January 1922.

== See also ==
- List of railway and metro stations in Taiwan
