= Jiji line =

Railway line in Taiwan

Jiji Line
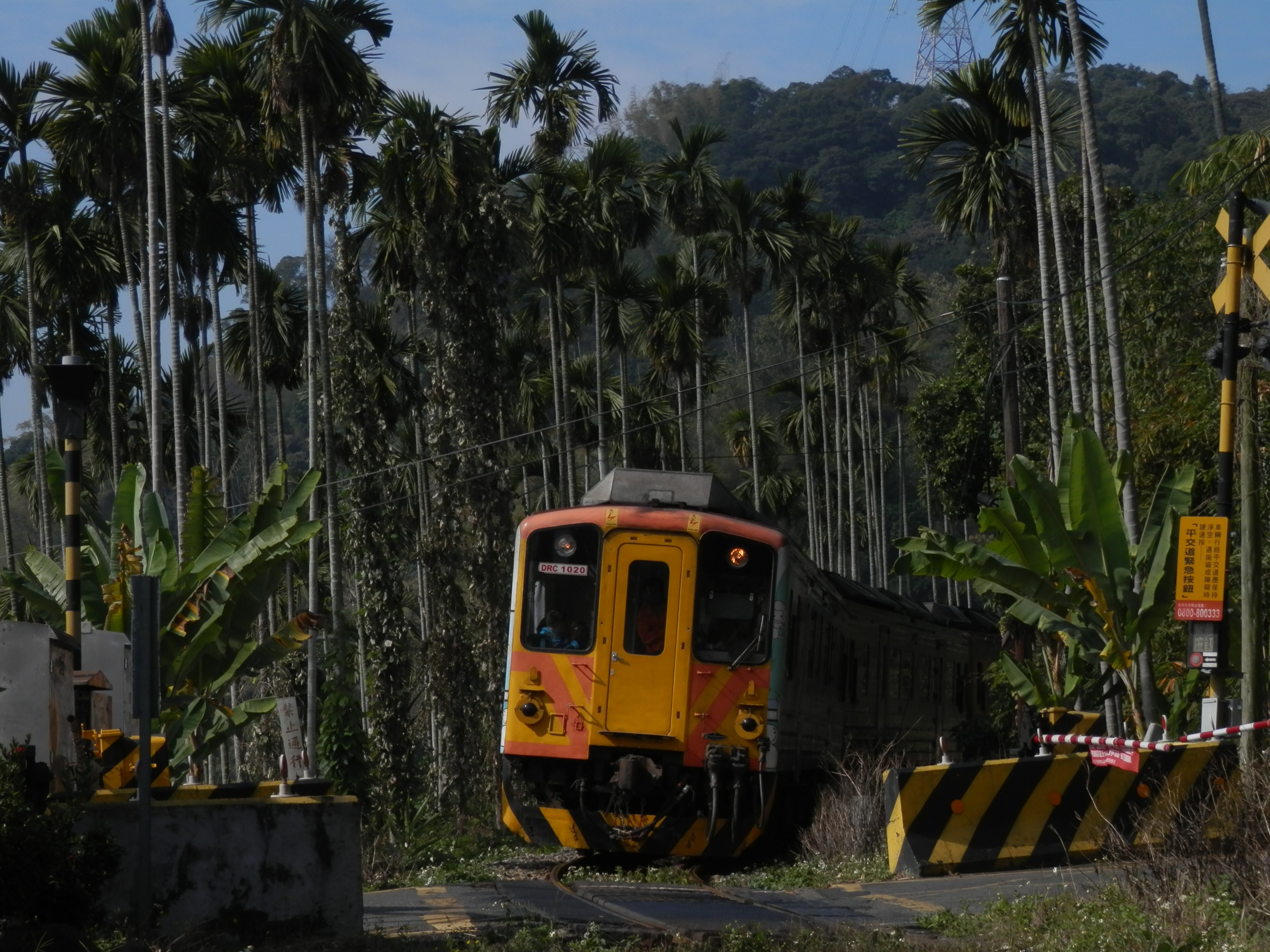

Overview
- Native name: 集集線
- Owner: Taiwan Railway
- Termini: Ershui; Checheng
- Stations: 8

Service
- Operator: Taiwan Railway

History
- Opened: 15 January 1922

Technical
- Line length: 29.7 km (18.5 mi) (excluding the extension to Tianzhong)

The Jiji line (Chinese: 集集線; pinyin: Jíjí Xiàn; Wade–Giles: Chi^{2}-chi^{2} Hsien^{4}; Pe̍h-ōe-jī: Chi̍p-chi̍p Soàⁿ) is a branch line of the Taiwan Railway, located in Changhua and Nantou counties in Taiwan. It is a narrow-gauge railway, and the longest branch line in Taiwan. The line is operated as a heritage railway, catering to tourists wanting to visit this part of central Taiwan.

What is now the Jiji line was originally constructed to help deliver construction materials to a power plant at Sun Moon Lake. Replacing a push car railway that previously covered the same route, it greatly expanded capacity and soon began to be used to export goods from the region, as well as carry passengers. Significant exports included wood and bananas. This spurred economic growth along the line in the first half of the 20th century.

When the economic situation shifted, the line began to lose money. The TRA proposed to close the line in 1986, but after resistance from local residents, the line was instead repurposed to attract tourism to the region. This effort was successful, spurring renewed economic growth along the line. The line has since developed partnerships with Japanese lines, promoted leopard cat conservation, and operated a museum train.

The success of the line prompted its extension west to better connect with the Taiwan High Speed Rail line. However, the line has faced significant difficulties regarding maintenance, especially given its old age, and parts of the line have been closed since 2021. Work is underway not only to repair the line, but also to widen its tunnels to allow for larger trains with increased capacity.

== History ==
=== Construction ===
During the early 20th century, Taiwan was under Japanese rule. The government sought to increase natural resource extraction. A push car railway was built from Puli to Ershui, to transport goods such as sugar. These push cars were stored at Checheng. At Ershui, goods could be transferred to the Western Trunk line. When the government began to promote industrialization, generating power became a key priority.

The Jiji line was built by Taiwan Electric Power Co. to transport construction materials to the Mingtan Pumped Storage Hydro Power Plant in Sun Moon Lake. The existing systems used to transport goods in the area could only transport very limited amounts of materials. Local oral history suggests construction may have begun in 1916, but official records date this to 1919. Mostly built along the older push car line, construction finished in 1921. Whereas the push car line had a gauge of 762 millimetres (30.0 in), the new line had a gauge of 1,067 millimetres (42.0 in). Push car routes remained in use past Checheng.

After being initially used as a private freight line, the railway was opened to wider use on 15 January 1922. At the time, the line was 29.7 kilometres (18.5 mi) long, connecting seven stations from Ershui railway station in Changhua County to Checheng railway station in Nantou County in a trip of about 40 minutes.

=== Goods and passengers ===
After the power plant was completed, the Jiji line was handed over to the railway department and became a regular railway. Soon the line began to be used to transport wood, including from Mount Xiluanda and Mount Danda. Also transported was agricultural produce grown near the line, including bananas and other fruit, rice, camphor, and sugar. The line provided an easy way to transfer logs from nearby heavily forested mountains. The right to log Mount Danda was obtained by a company run by Sun Hai in 1959, and the forestry sector subsequently became a significant part of the economy of Checheng, at one point employing most of the town. Wood transported from these mountains was used to build a torii at Tokyo's Meiji Shrine. Bananas were also exported to Japan, mainly from Nantou County. The line also began to transport passengers, with early trains consisting of one goods carriage and one passenger carriage. Economic growth along the line followed. Bananas were collected at Jiji, which served as the administrative capital, before onward export. Banana exports peaked in 1930.

In 1927, the line was sold to the Government-General of Taiwan for over ¥3 million. This was when the line was given its current name (it was previously named after Checheng). Six tunnels were constructed in 1925, and a seventh was constructed in 1960. Government records from 1937 state that there were seven round-trips per day from Ershui to Checheng, with one direction taking one hour and ten minutes.

=== Tourist line ===
Declining exports and the opening of Provincial Highway 16 reduced freight traffic using the rail line. Domestic logging was banned in 1985, and the forestry sector in the region declined. In 1986, the Taiwan Railways Administration (TRA) announced it intended to close the line, as it was operating at a loss. This was opposed by locals. In 1994, collaboration between the railways administration and the Jiji Township Office saw the line repurposed as a heritage railway. Trains were newly painted, and tourist numbers increased. This was the first line in Taiwan to be explicitly aimed at tourism. The use of the wooden Jiji railway station in an advertisement in the 1990s helped drive interest in the line, and it began to carry about 1,000 tourists every weekend.

The line was severely damaged in the 1999 Jiji earthquake, which damaged most of the line's stations. Landslides buried parts of the track, some trackbed shifted as much as 3.5 metres (11 ft), and the tunnels cracked, allowing water to leak into them. Due to action taken to stabilize the damaged tunnels, use of the tunnels became restricted to smaller diesel locomotives. Following extensive restoration and strengthening, the line resumed operations on 21 January 2001. 200 metres (660 ft) of track that was bypassed near Zhuoshui railway station was converted into a memorial for the earthquake. The "Sun Moon Lake National Scenic Area" was created in response to the earthquake, with this new area encompassing the end section of the line.

The aging tunnels began to severely affect services, with one experiencing more than 10 roof collapses. In March 2010 service beyond Longquan station was suspended until 14 January 2011 in order for repair work to be performed on the line's seven tunnels. The TRA provided a rail replacement bus service. The work started in April 2010 and continued until 30 June 2011, costing NT$ 151.1 million. The brick and concrete tunnels were rebuilt with steel and rebar, to meet modern earthquake safety standards. The tunnels were also expanded from 3.6 metres (12 ft) wide and 4.1 metres (13 ft) high by around 10–20 centimetres (3.9–7.9 in) to accommodate larger locomotives, raising potential annual capacity from 300,000 passengers to 500,000. The line was fully reopened on 9 July 2011, an occasion marked by nine days of fare-free travel. Two old steam engines, CK101 and CK124, were brought in to reopen the line. The reopening was attended by then-President Ma Ying-jeou and Premier Wu Den-yih.

Following a trend of railway partnerships between Taiwan and Japan that began in 2012, on 28 October 2014 the Jiji line became twinned with the Isumi Line in Japan. Under the agreement, individuals with used tickets from one of the lines would be able to ride the other. The Jiji line, which was then 29.7 kilometres (18.5 mi), was the longest branch line in Taiwan, while the Isumi Line was 26.8 kilometres (16.7 mi) long. Like the Jiji line, the Isumi Line was also primarily a tourist line. The agreement was the fourth Japan-Taiwan railway partnership. In 2016, a similar partnership was established with Japan's Tenryū Hamanako Line.

In 2017, the Jiji line was extended past Ershui station to Tianzhong railway station, to enhance connectivity with the Taiwan High Speed Rail (HSR) line. Tianzhong station is connected by an express bus to Changhua HSR station. On 25 January 2018, a memorandum was signed between the HSR corporation, TRA, and the Tourism Bureau to further develop tourism along the Jiji line. There are plans to build a 2.8-kilometre (1.7 mi) rail link directly connecting Tianzhong station and Changhua HSR station, which would in turn allow direct connections between the HSR and the Jiji line.

In 2019, trains on the line were internally decorated with drawings of leopard cats in a joint project between the Tourism Bureau and the TRA. The drawings were criticized as resembling leopards rather than leopard cats, and it was later discovered that they were based on a Shutterstock drawing of a leopard. On 26 August, the Tourism Bureau announced it would work with the Endemic Species Research Institute to develop new imagery. The next day, the Russian designer of the Shutterstock leopard drawing shared three leopard cat drawings, stating they were free to use in a message supporting leopard cat conservation in Taiwan. The Tourism Bureau rejected the designs, but Minister of Transportation and Communications Lin Chia-lung criticized this decision and instructed the Bureau to invite the designer to Taiwan. Both Lin and the designer were present for the relaunch of the train with new designs on 18 September.

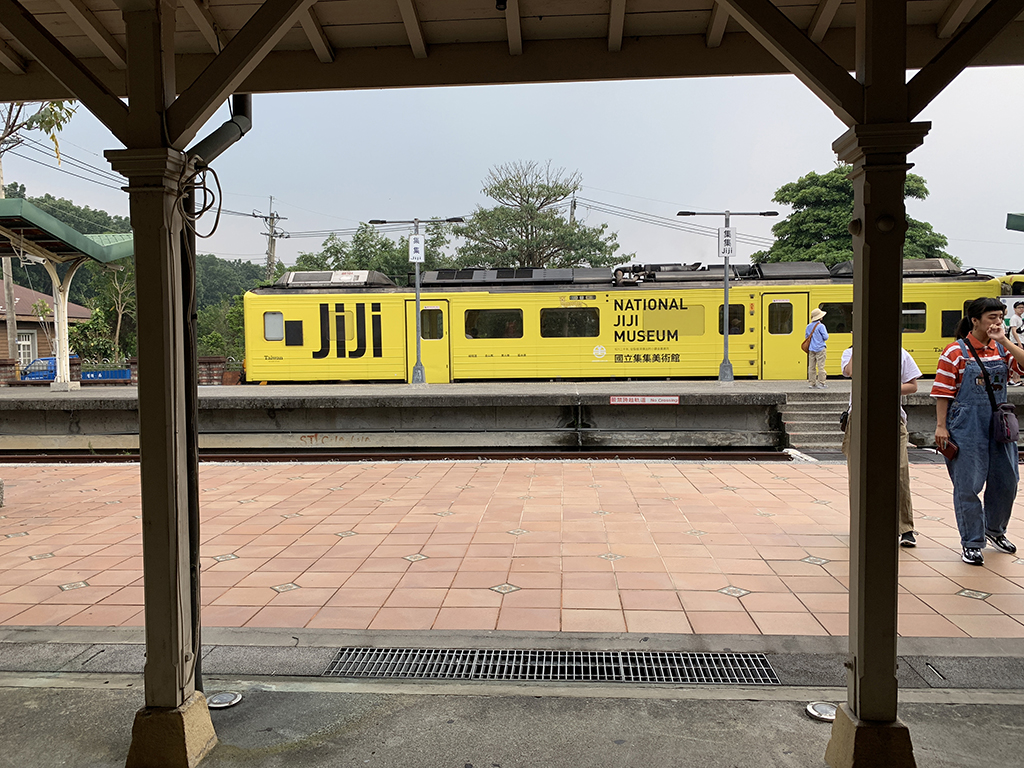
The National Museum train is painted to resemble a banana, reflecting the history of the line.

In September 2019, a four-car train was launched on the line to serve as an art museum. The art museum train was colored to resemble a banana, reflecting the history of the region. The color was also intended to symbolize the leopard cat. The interior decor was also inspired by bananas. The interior hosted exhibits reflecting the history of the line, including coverage of the 1999 earthquake 20 years later.

On 16 August 2021, a landslide blocked travel beyond Jiji. While travel resumed on 20 August, it was halted again on 26 August due to concerns about the deformation of one of the tunnel walls. It was found that the damage was caused by extensive rainfall. On 18 May 2022, rainfall delayed the repairs further by causing another landslide. With repairs expected to continue until March 2023, businesses in Checheng requested a reduction in rent while the railway was out of service. A further three landslides occurred before March 2023, pushing the expected repairs into 2025, and raising consideration of rerouting the line through a new tunnel.

On 14 January 2022, the line's 100th anniversary was celebrated at Jiji railway station, attracting rail enthusiasts from throughout the country. The 1,000 commemorative tickets produced for the event sold out within an hour.

In May 2024 it was decided to take the opportunity to undertake other needed maintenance alongside the already ongoing repair works. The line was closed beyond Zhuoshui railway station, and the work would include expanding the tunnels to accommodate larger trains that can carry more tourists. The line up to at least Jiji station is expected to reopen within 2025. The full line is expected to reopen in 2026 or 2027, with capacity to run a train every 60 minutes rather than every 80 minutes.

== Route information ==
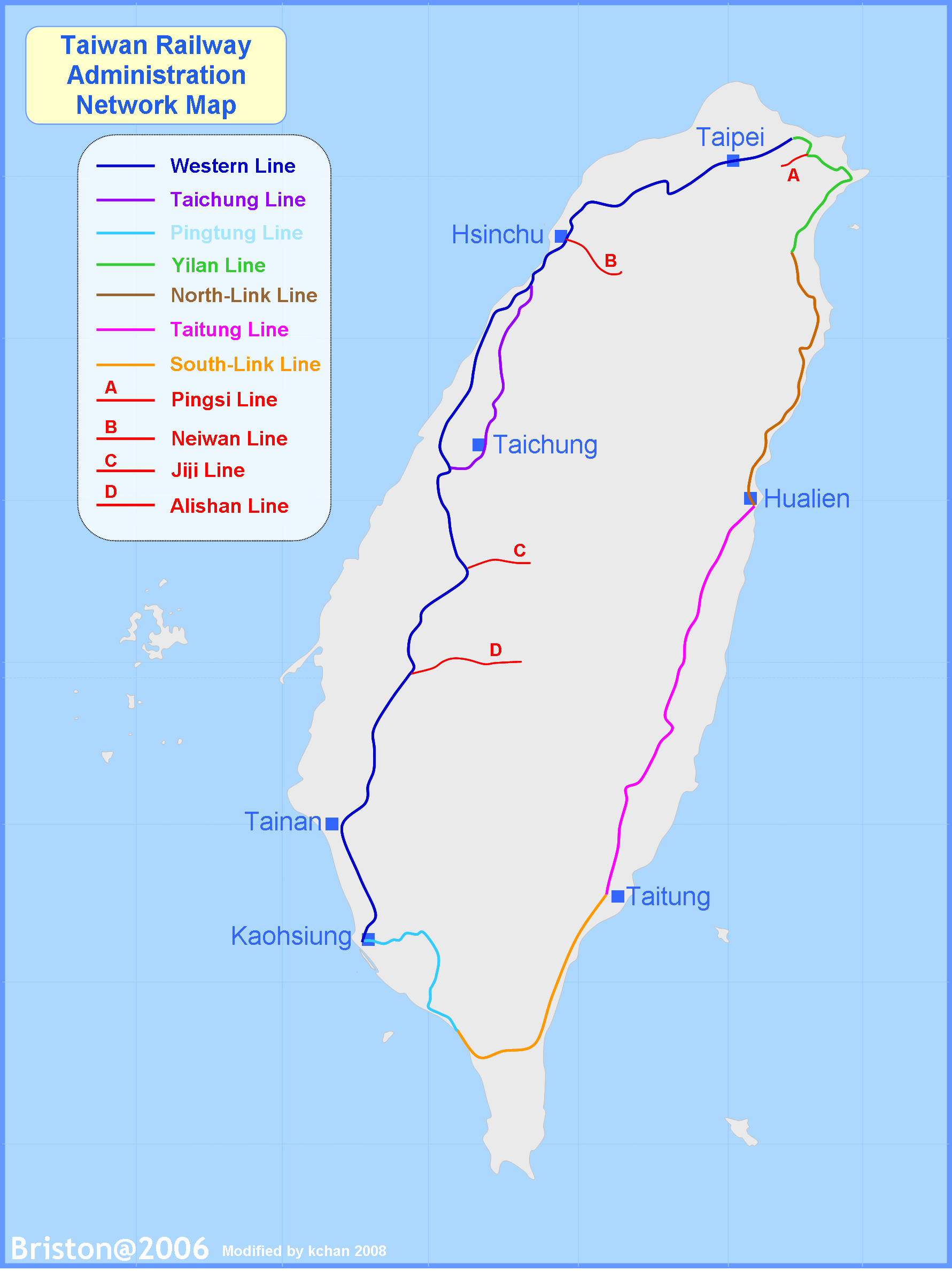
The Jiji line is marked by a "C" in the center of the map.

The Jiji line is the longest of Taiwan's branch lines and one of three operated by the TRA. Running through central Taiwan, it is the only railway in Nantou County. It is classified as a narrow-gauge railway, one of four in Taiwan. The route largely follows the Zhuoshui River, the longest river in Taiwan, although after Shuili railway station it instead follows a smaller tributary. Some of the line passes through landslide-prone areas. Part of the surrounding areas remain agricultural. While bananas are grown less, dragon fruit and oranges are increasingly harvested. The terminus at Checheng is in a relatively flat basin.

== Tourism ==
Much of the line's appeal comes from the attractiveness of its surrounding area. The Jiji railway station is considered picturesque, and the line further on passes through mountain tunnels. A 4.5 kilometres (2.8 mi) section near Zhuoshui railway station parallels a stretch of road known as the "Green Tunnel", and is a common area to photograph the trains. A railway museum has been built in Checheng, whose station serves as the line's terminus. Checheng has also seen some of its old forestry infrastructure converted into tourist attractions, and a logging museum has been created. A steam locomotive known as CK101, first brought to Taiwan from Japan in 1917, is used on the Jiji line for special occasions.

The Jiji railway station is registered as a historic building under the Cultural Heritage Preservation Act by the Bureau of Cultural Heritage. It is considered to have both historical and cultural value, as it retains the Japanese-style architecture it was built with in 1933, making it one of the few remaining Japanese-style stations in Taiwan. The line has been used as a filming site for many television shows and movies. Bike paths have been developed along the route, and shuttle buses connect Shuili railway station and Checheng station with the nearby Sun Moon Lake. Tourism has revived the area, with the former school and some logging buildings in Checheng being repurposed due to new demands. The creation of the "Sun Moon Lake National Scenic Area" saw further connections developed between Checheng and Sun Moon Lake.

== Operations and fares ==
As of 2024, there were twelve daily trains that ran for 50 minutes each way from Ershui railway station to Checheng railway station. The headway between each run is about two hours. As of June 2025, seven eastbound runs start at Ershui station and end at Checheng station, while two begin at Tianzhong railway station. There is also one eastbound run daily between Yuanlin railway station and Checheng station. One round trip per day takes place between Changhua Station and Checheng Station; however, these depart very early in the morning and very late at night.

Westbound there are seven Checheng-Ershui runs, two Checheng-Tianzhong runs, and one run between Shuili railway station and Changhua railway station. Due to the line being single tracked, only two trains can travel the full length at a time, with the two meeting at Zhuoshui railway station.

Historically, the width of the tunnels restricted the type of trains that could be used on the line. Following the renovations from 2010 to 2011, the Jiji Line became navigable to other types of trains.

As of 2024, a one-way ticket fare from Ershui to Checheng costs NT$90. The Jiji Line ticket and one-day round-trip pass is available for purchase at all the following TRA stations: Zhunan, Miaoli, Fengyuan, Taichung, Changhua, Yuanlin, Tianzhong, Ershui, Dajia, Shalu, Douliu, Dounan, and Chiayi.

Using the MRT calculation, the fare will be NT$55 in the future, and will support EasyCard.

=== Stations ===
Name	Chinese	Taiwanese	Hakka	Transfers and notes	Location	
Tianzhong	田中			→ Taiwan High Speed Rail	Tianzhong	Changhua; County
Ershui	二水	Jī-chúi	Ngi-súi	→ West Coast line	Ershui	Changhua; County
Yuanquan	源泉	Goân-choâⁿ	Ngièn-chhièn		Ershui	Changhua; County
Zhuoshui	濁水	Lô-chúi	Chhu̍k-súi		Mingjian	Nantou; County
Longquan	龍泉	Lêng-choâⁿ	Liùng-chhièn		Jiji	Nantou; County
Jiji	集集	Chi̍p-chi̍p	Si̍p-si̍p		Jiji	Nantou; County
Shuili	水里	Chúi-lí	Súi-lî		Shuili	Nantou; County
Checheng	車埕	Chhia-tiâⁿ	Chhâ-chhâng		Shuili	Nantou; County

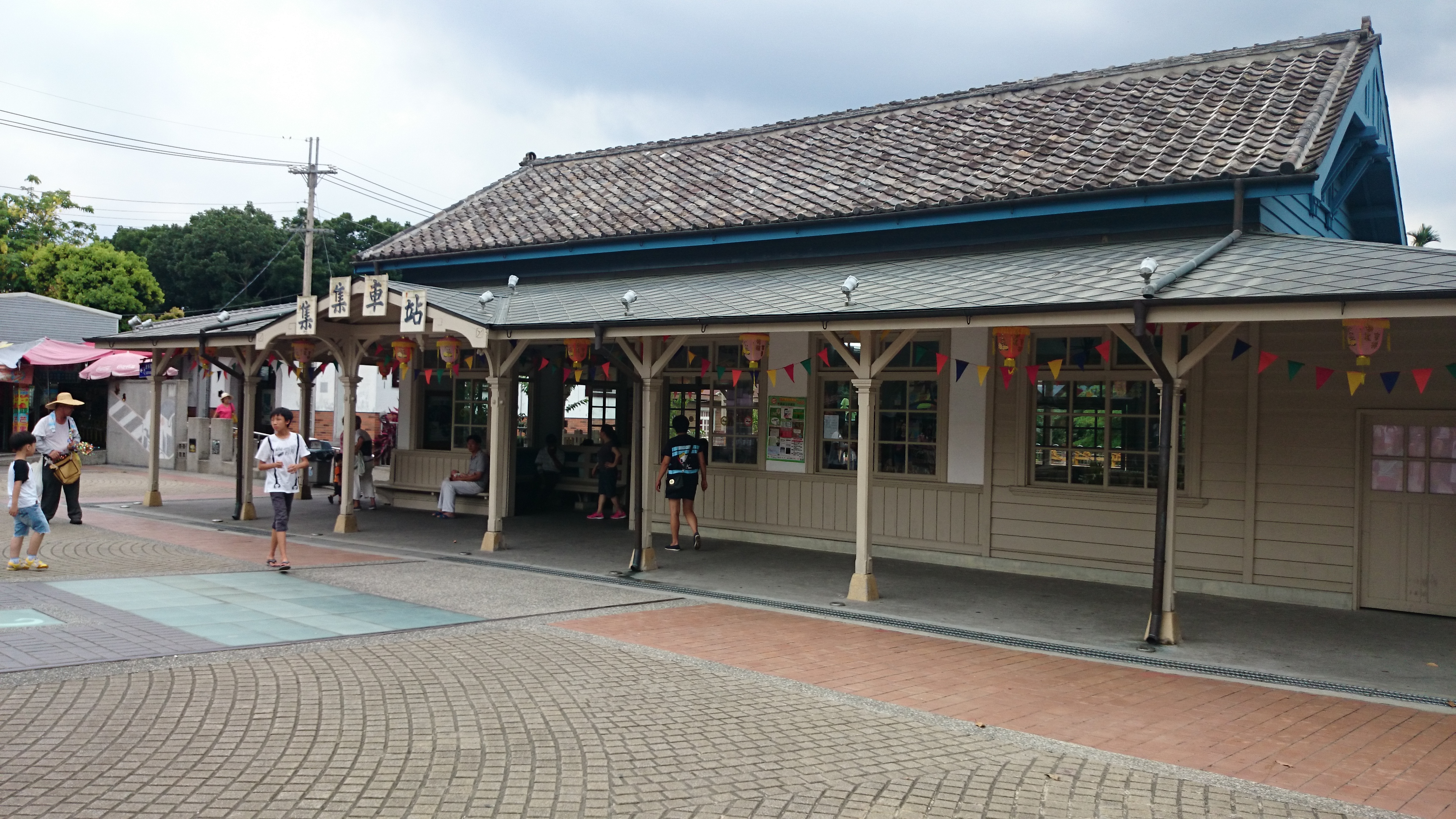
Jiji railway station

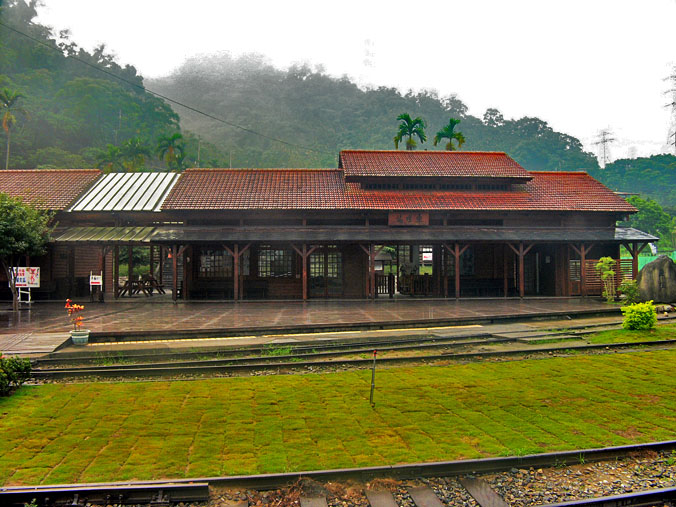
Checheng railway station
