= Rerum Novarum Centre =

Organization based in Taipei, Taiwan

Coordinates: 25°1′43.94″N 121°31′59.73″E

- Predecessor: Social Service Centre
- Established: 1971; 55 years ago
- Location: Taipei, Taiwan
- Chairman: Yves Nalet
- Director: Stephana Wei
- Main organ: Rerum Novarum Bulletin
- Affiliations: Jesuit, Catholic
- Staff: Ten full-time
- Website: Rerum Novarum Centre

Rerum Novarum Centre, Taipei, increased operations in 1971 but had roots going back to Jesuit social services in Taiwan since the 1950s. The Centre tries to meet the major social and legal needs of native and foreign workers in the greater Taipei area, while also responding to emergencies and to the needs of the aboriginal peoples of Northern Taiwan.

== History ==
=== Social Service Centre ===
Since the 1950s the Society of Jesus in Taiwan has pastored parishes among the Atayal tribe in north-central Taiwan and Jesuits in the cities have advocated for the rights of workers and of the disabled.

In the 1960s, the American Jesuit E. Dowd founded in Hsinchu a vocational school and dormitory for young workers. This work has evolved into the Catholic Social Service Centre in Hsinchu.

=== Rerum Novarum Centre ===
In 1971 Jesuits responded to the increasing influx of workers into Taipei by opening a centre that gathered information on problems facing workers, that trained union leaders, and that monitored the government's labour policies. The centre was named after Rerum Novarum ("Of New Things"), the 1891 encyclical of Pope Leo XIII which was the first in a series of social encyclicals in the Catholic church.

By the 1980s Rerum Novarum Centre was offering legal advice along with health and safety services for workers and was publishing books on worker issues. These issues grew to include advocacy for workers' rights, anti-nuclear power and the environment. By the 1990s the Center's work had grown in assisting foreign workers and in tending to occupational injuries. Then after the Jiji earthquake in 1999 services were increased on behalf of the aboriginal communities of Nantou and Hsinchu counties.

== See also ==
- List of Jesuit sites
