= Shuili railway station =

Railway station in Shuili, Nantou County, Taiwan

Shuili Station 水里車站
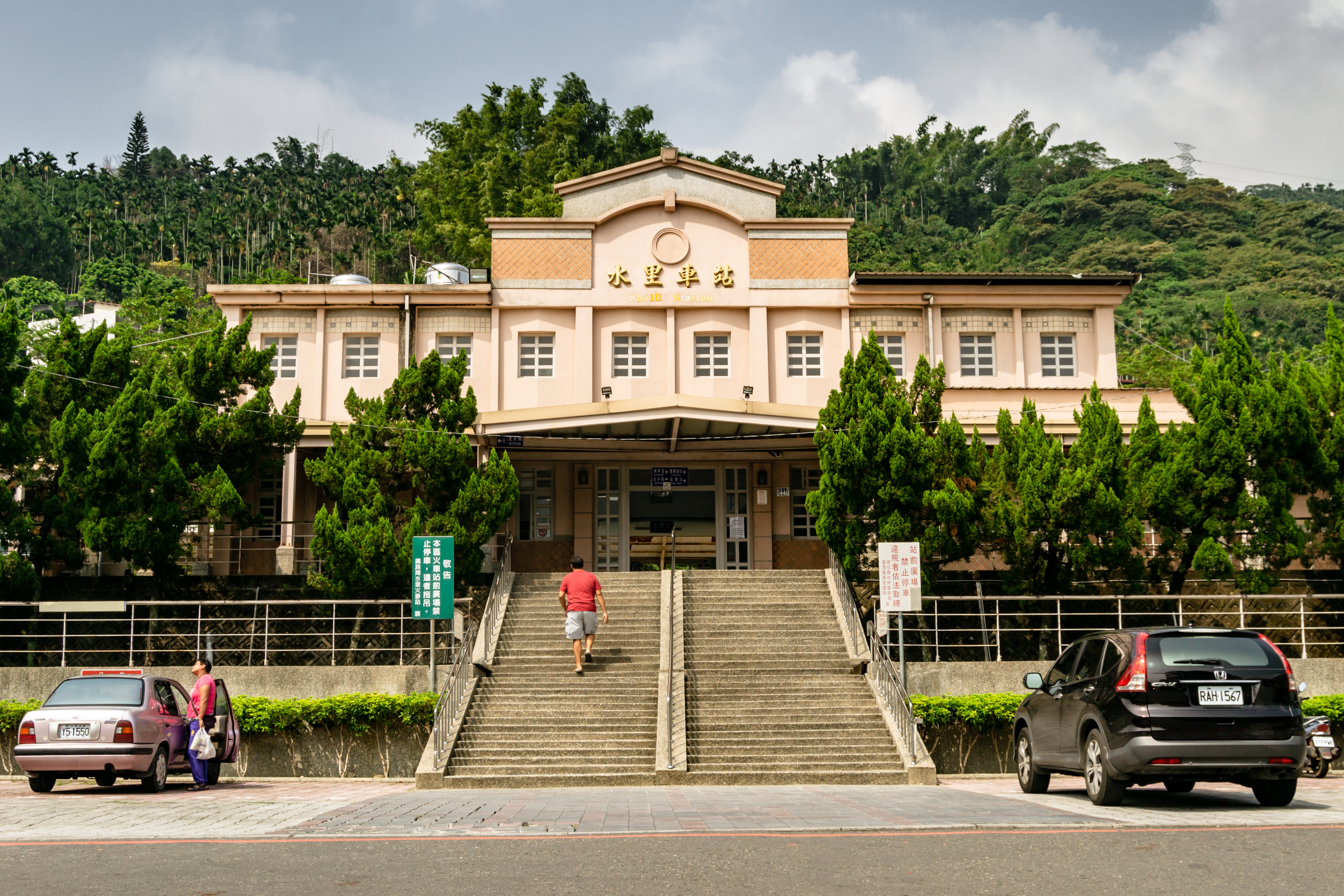

General information
- Location: Shuili, Nantou County, Taiwan
- Coordinates: 23.818642°N 120.853266°E
- System: Train station
- Owner: Taiwan Railway Corporation
- Operator: Taiwan Railway Corporation
- Line: Jiji
- Platforms: 2
- Tracks: 3

History
- Opened: 14 January 1922

Passengers
- 172 daily (2024)

Services
Preceding station	Taiwan Railway	Following station
Jiji towards Ershui	Jiji line	Checheng Terminus
Location

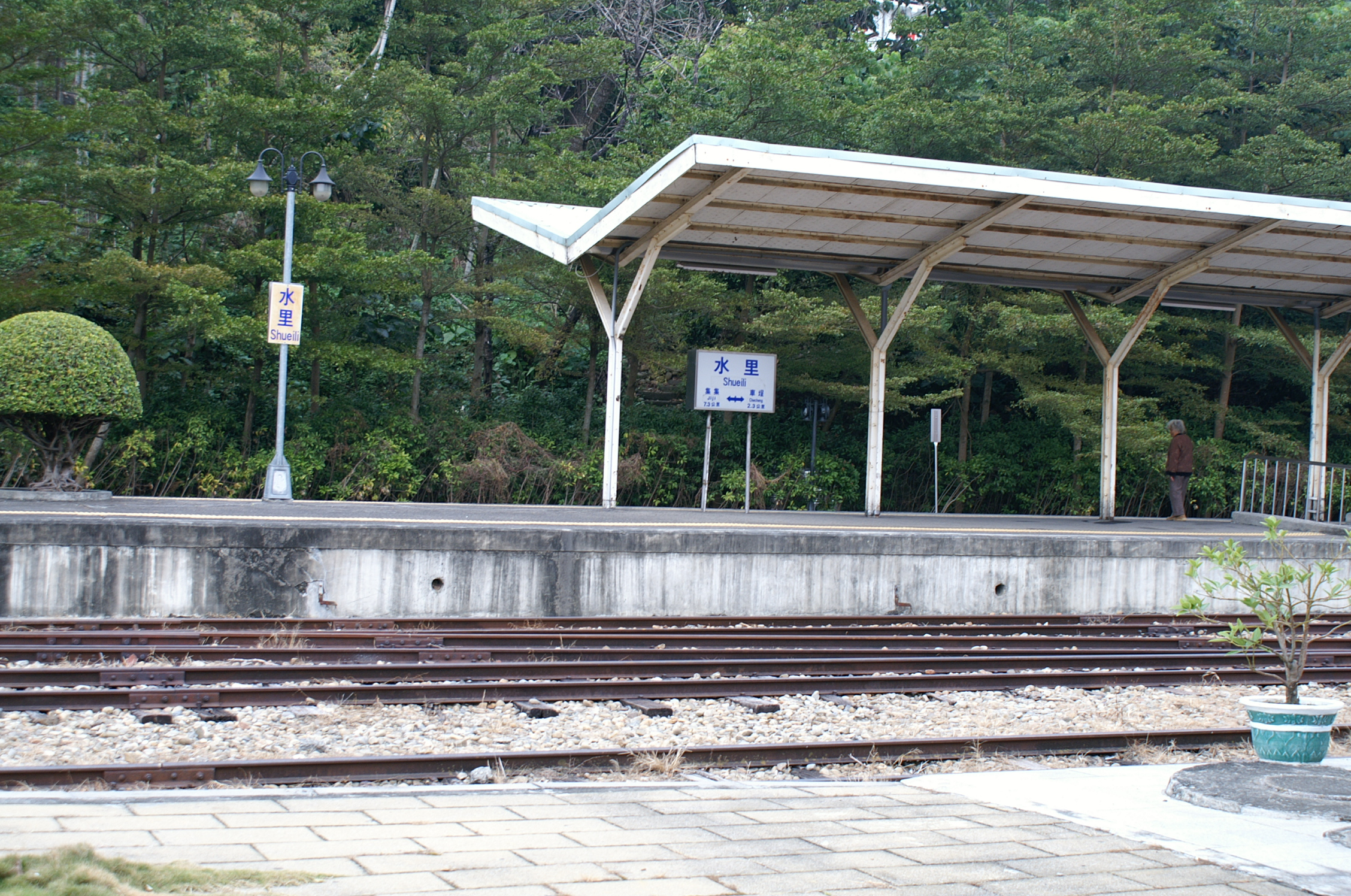
Shuili station platform

Shuili (Chinese: 水里車站; pinyin: Shuǐlǐ Chēzhàn) is a railway station on Taiwan Railway Jiji line located in Shuili Township, Nantou County, Taiwan.

== History ==
The station was opened on 14 January 1922.

== See also ==
- List of railway stations in Taiwan
