= Jiji Military History Park =

Park in Jiji, Nantou County, Taiwan

- 集集軍史公園
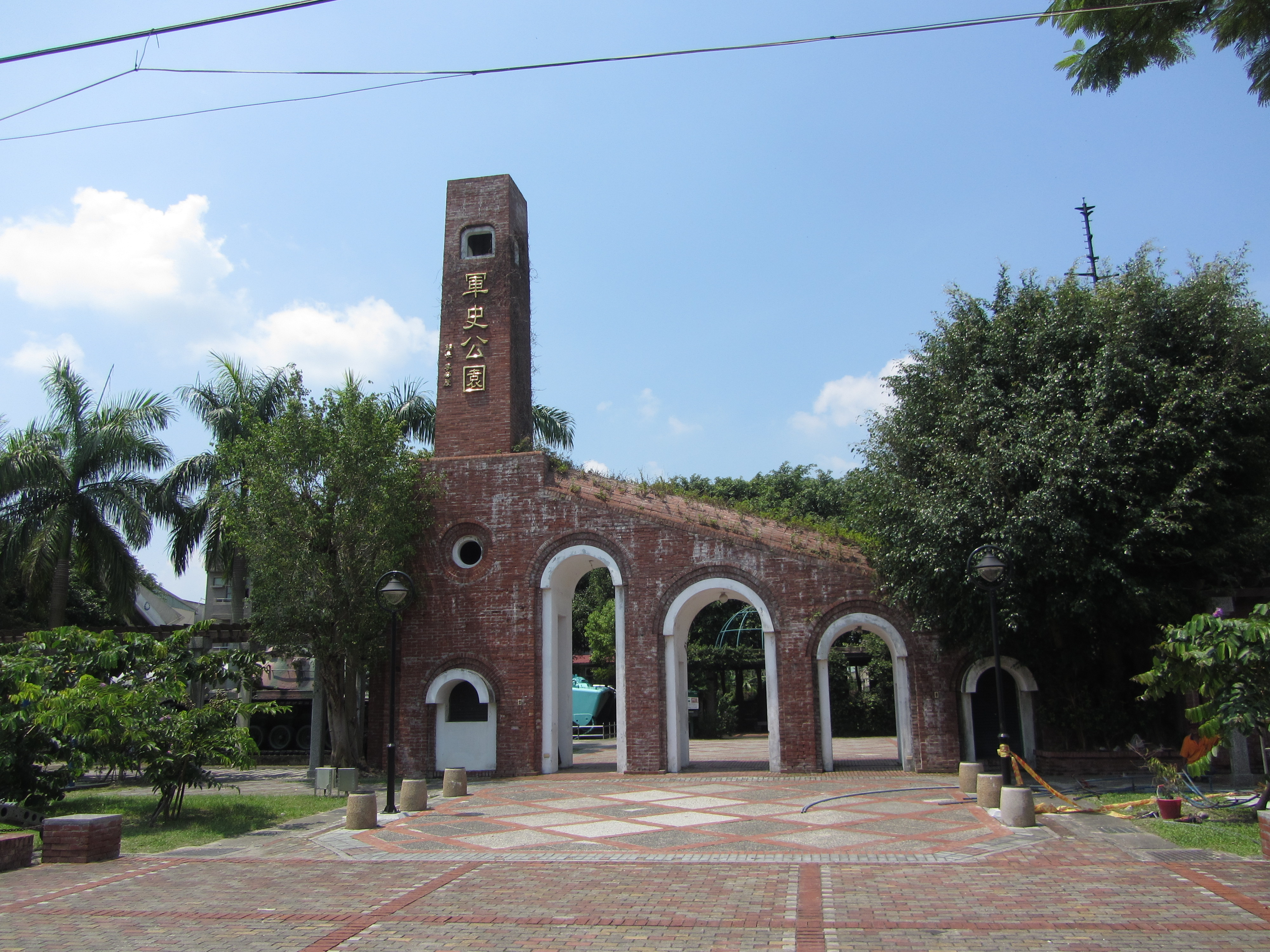
- Interactive map of the Jiji Military History Park area

General information
- Type: memorial park
- Location: Jiji, Nantou County, Taiwan
- Coordinates: 23°49′37.6″N 120°47′43.5″E

The Jiji Military History Park (traditional Chinese: 集集軍史公園; simplified Chinese: 集集军史公园; pinyin: Jíjí Jūnshǐ Gōngyuán) is a historical park in Jiji Township, Nantou County, Taiwan about the Republic of China Armed Forces.

== Features ==
The park displays a set of fighter jet, airplane, battle tank, rocket launcher, amphibious tank etc.

== Transportation ==
The park is accessible within walking distance East of Jiji Station of Taiwan Railway.

== See also ==
- List of parks in Taiwan
