= Mingxin Academy =

Former tutorial academy in Jiji, Nantou County, Taiwan

Mingxin Academy 明新書院
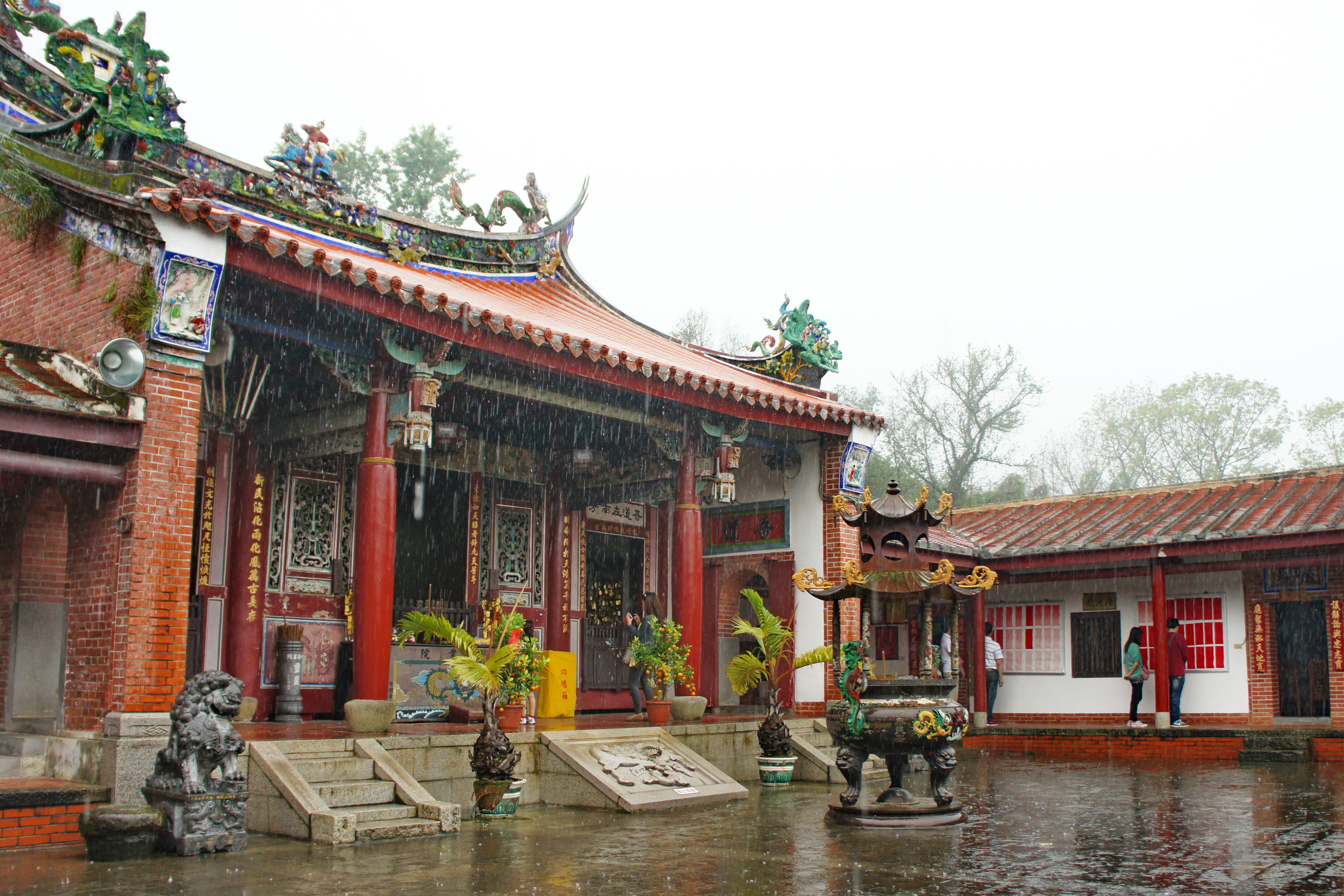

Location
- Jiji, Nantou County, Taiwan
- Coordinates: 23°49′38.9″N 120°47′58.7″E

Information
- Type: former academy
- Established: 1885

The Mingxin Academy (traditional Chinese: 明新書院; simplified Chinese: 明新书院; pinyin: Míngxīn Shūyuàn) is a former tutorial academy in Jiji Township, Nantou County, Taiwan.

== History ==
The academy was built in 1885 during the Qing Dynasty rule as the first private school within the area. In 1908, it moved to its current location. In 1985, the building was designated as Grade 3 historic site.

== Exhibitions ==
The library is arranged with old bookshelves, desks and chairs. There are also various kinds of traditional handicrafts displayed outside the academy building.

== Transportation ==
The building is accessible within walking distance east of Jiji Station of Taiwan Railway.

== See also ==
- List of tourist attractions in Taiwan
