= Jiji, Nantou =

Urban township in Nantou County, Taiwan

Jiji Township 集集鎭 Shūshū, Chi-Chi
- Urban township
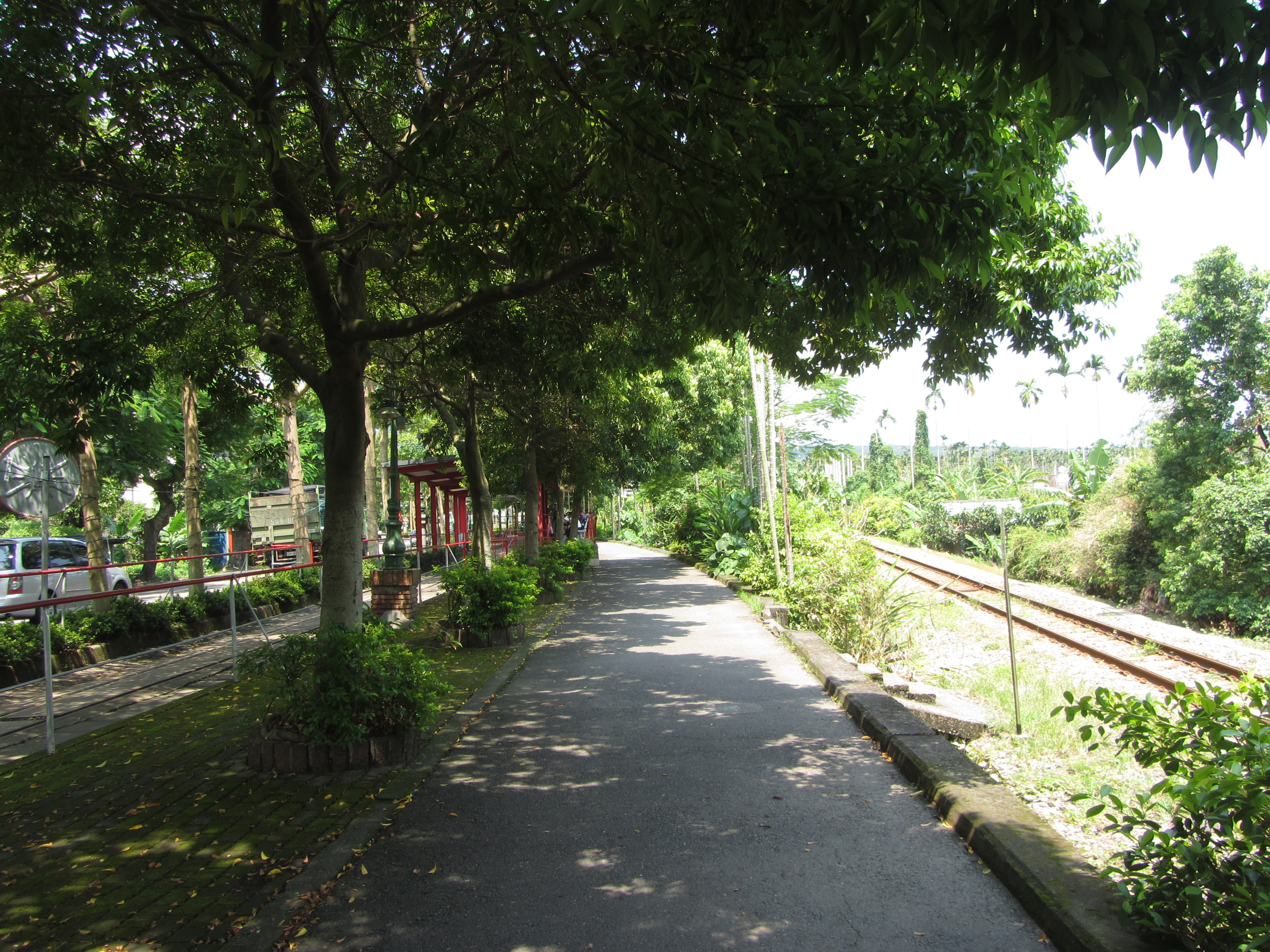
- Rail tracks of the Jiji Line

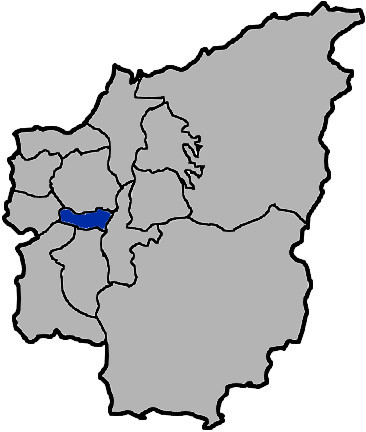
- Jiji Township in Nantou County
- Location: Nantou County, Taiwan

Area
  - Total: 50 km^{2} (19 sq mi)

Population (February 2023)
  - Total: 10,056
  - Density: 200/km^{2} (520/sq mi)

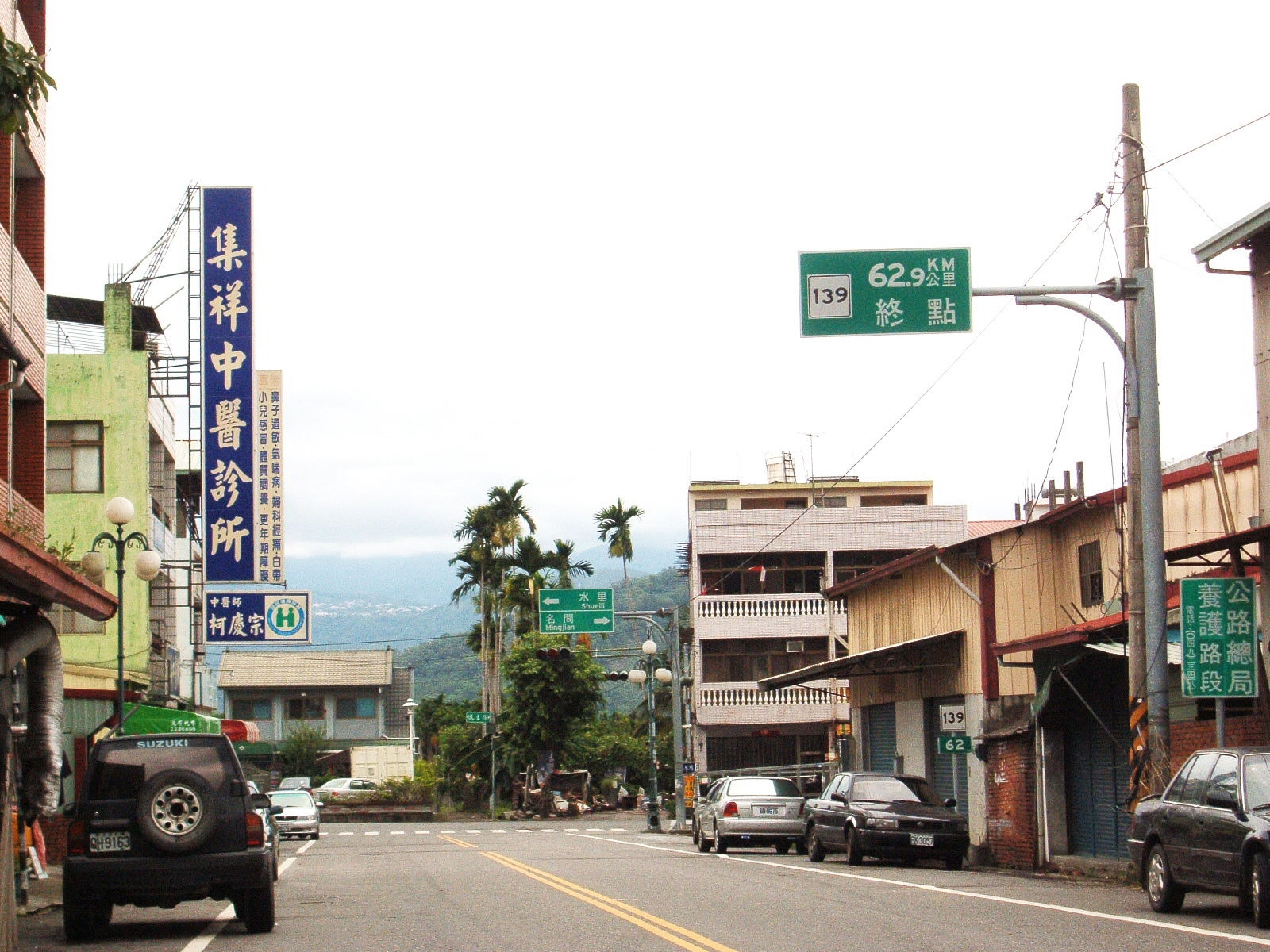
Downtown Jiji

Jiji (Chinese: 集集; pinyin: Jíjí; Wade–Giles: Chi^{2}-chi^{2}; Pe̍h-ōe-jī: Chi̍p-chi̍p) or Chichi is an urban township located in the west central portion of Nantou County, Taiwan. Jiji is the smallest of Taiwan's townships by area.

The township is a popular destination on the Jiji Railway Line. In March 2012, it was named one of the Top 10 Small Tourist Towns by the Tourism Bureau of Taiwan.

== History ==
Han Chinese from Zhangzhou began arriving in the area in 1771. The name originates from "Chiv-Chiv", a phrase in the Formosan languages.

During the Japanese era (1895–1945), Jiji was a collection and shipping export point for camphor produced in the surrounding areas. By 1940, it was administrated as Shūshū Town (集集街), Niitaka District (新高郡), Taichū Prefecture (now Taichung.) Jiji township then encompassed a much larger area that included the present-day Shuili Township.

In 1946, Niitaka District was renamed Yushan District (玉山區), Taichung County, and Jiji contemporaneously became a township. In 1950, Shuili Township was separated from Jiji. During World War II, a U.S. bomber was shot down by Japanese artillery, killing four airmen.

The township was the epicenter of the eponymous and devastating 1999 Jiji earthquake.

== Demographics ==
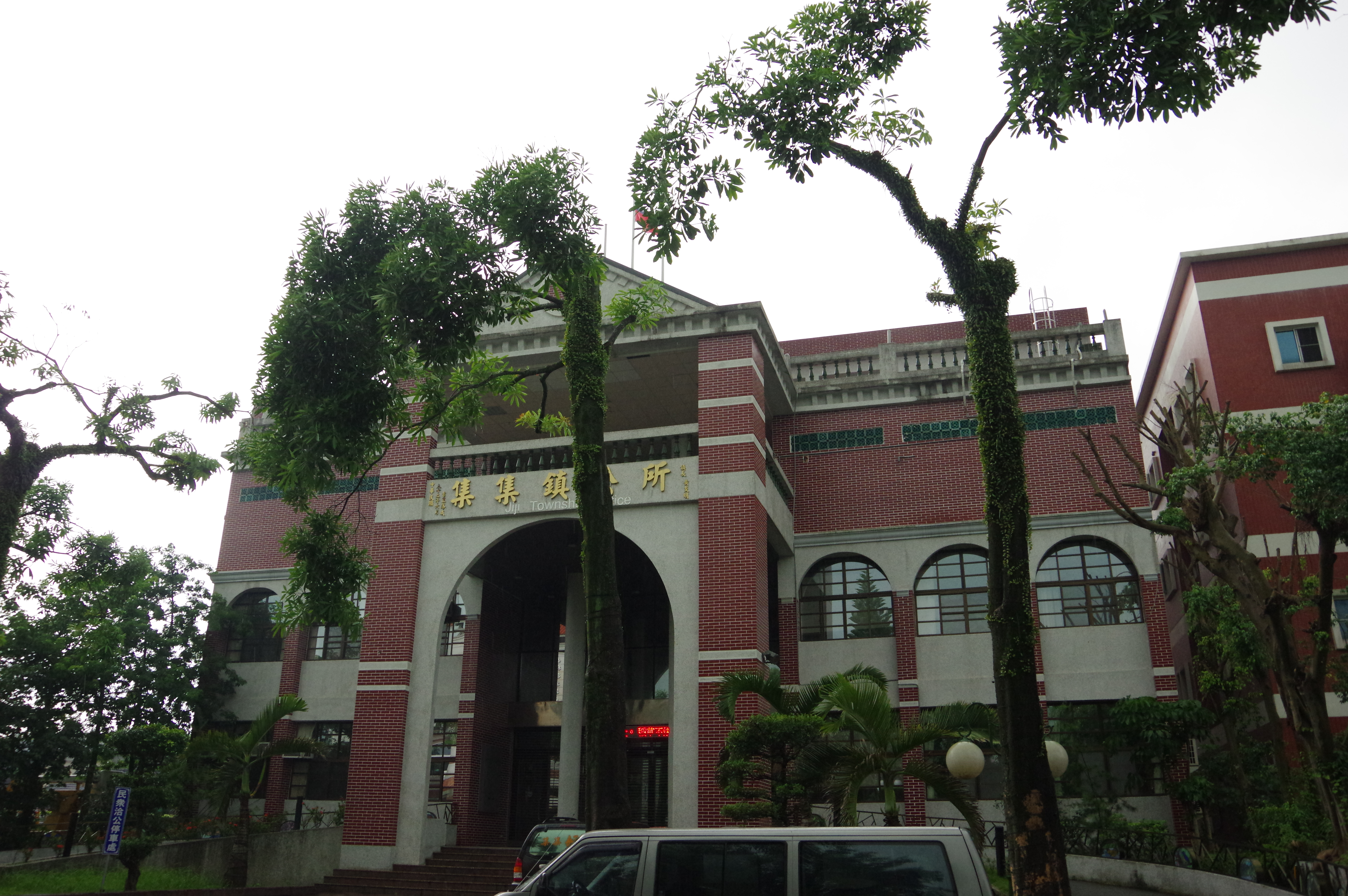
Jiji Township Office

As of February 2023, Jiji was home to a total population of 10,056, including 5,745 males and 5,290 females. Historically, the population peaked at 16,395 in 1970, and has fallen steadily since then. By contrast, the number of households grew from 2,772 in 1970 to a high of 4,376 in 2014, falling slightly to 4,308 by 2016.

== Geography ==
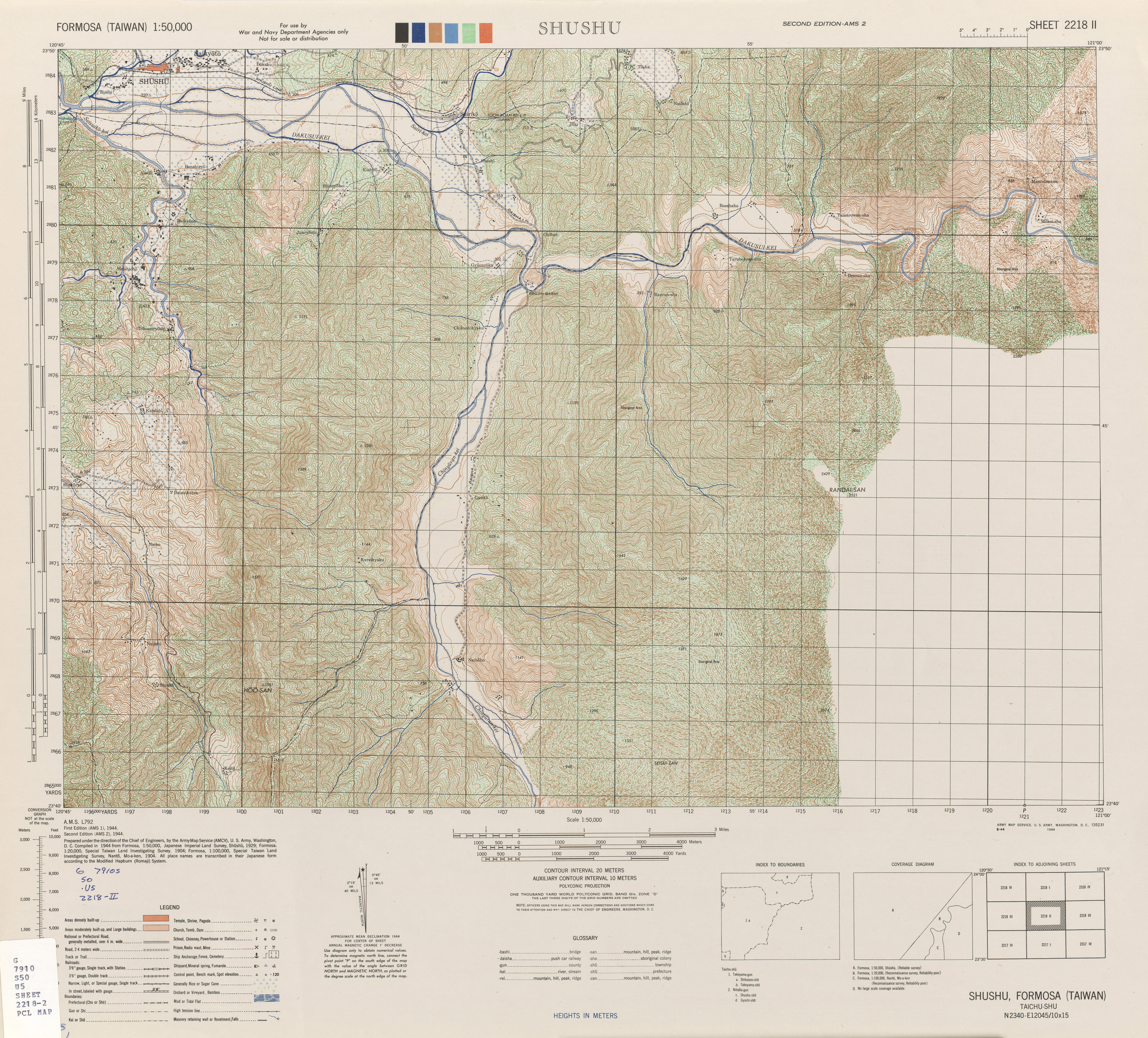
Map of Jiji (labeled as SHŪSHŪ) and surrounding area (1944)

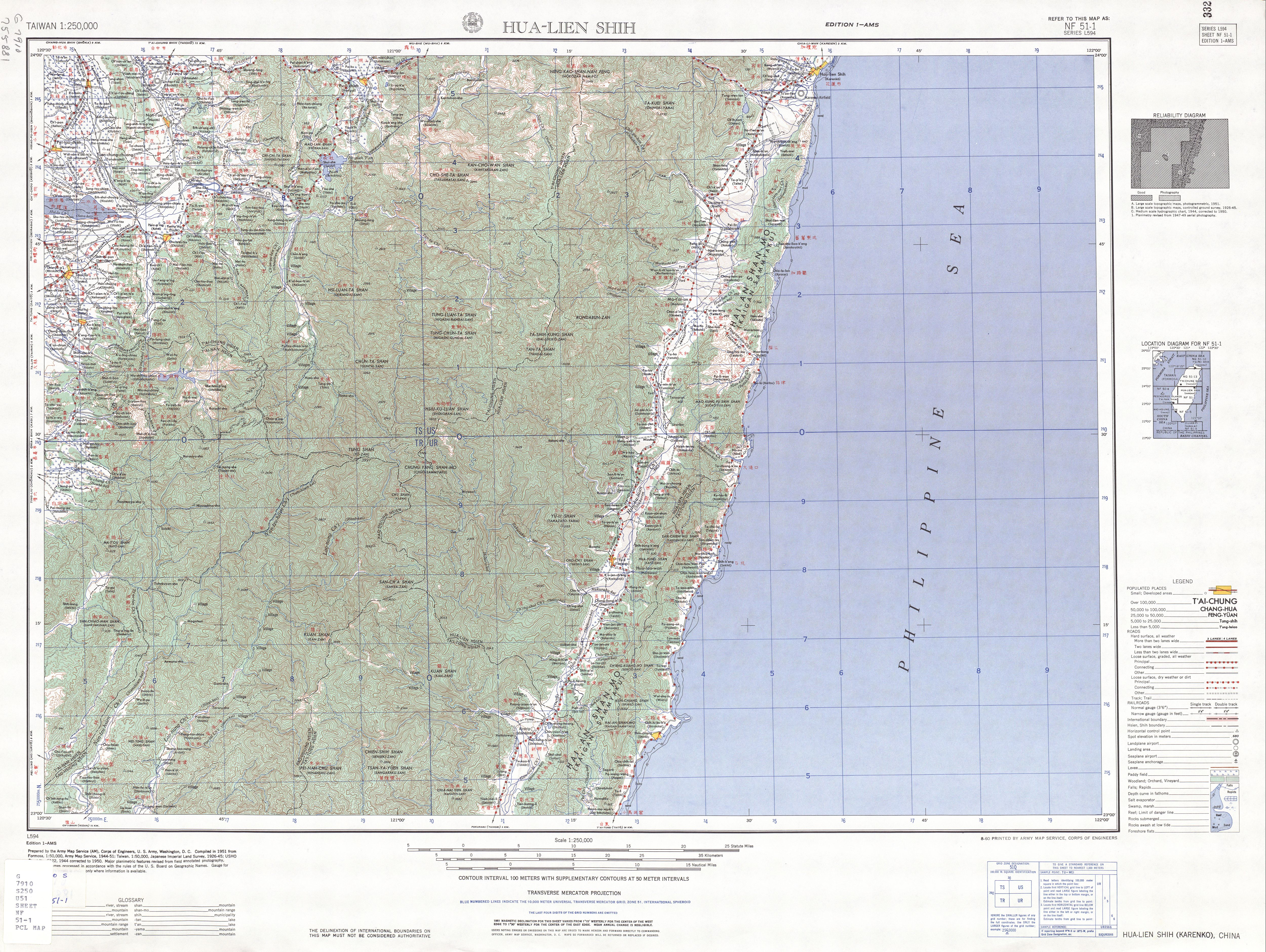
Map including Jiji (labeled as Chi-chi (Shūshū) 集集) (1951)

Jiji is bordered by Zhongliao to the north, Mingjian to the west, Zhushan and Lugu to the south, and Shuili to the east. The Zhuoshui River flows westward along the south border of the township. Jiji Township has a total area of 49.72 square kilometers. The lowest point in the township is 230 m above sea level and its highest point is Big Jiji Mountain (集集大山) at 1392 m above sea level. The township is rather mountainous and is surrounded by mountains on all sides.

== Administrative divisions ==
Jiji is divided into 11 villages: Ailiao, Bazhang, Fushan, Guangming, Heping, Jiji, Linwei, Tianliao, Yongchang, Yuying and Wucuo.

== Politics ==
The 2014 mayoral election was won by 29-year-old Chen Chi-heng of the newly formed Trees Party, in what was characterized by the media as a surprise.

== Tourist attractions ==
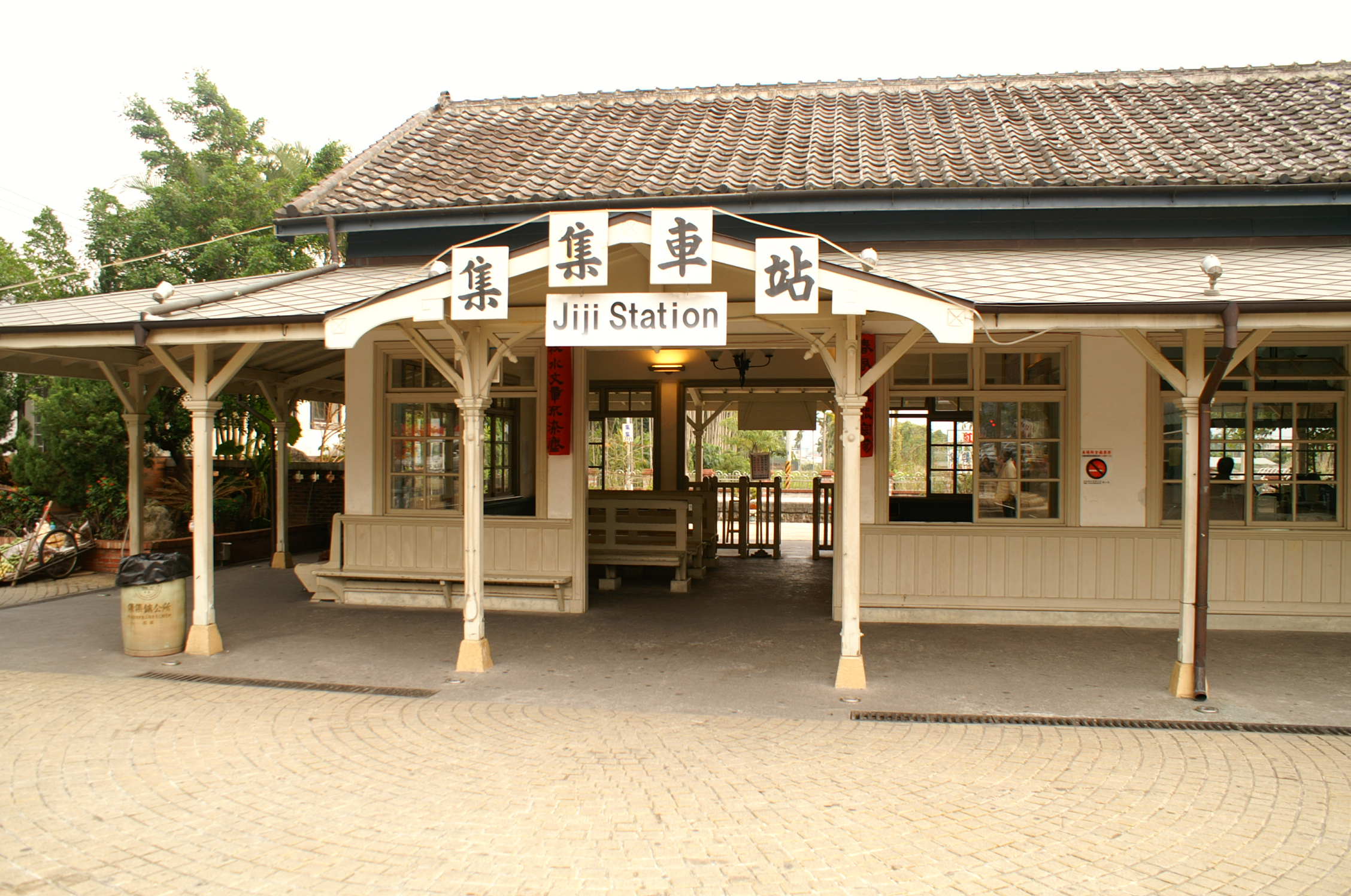
Jiji Rail Station

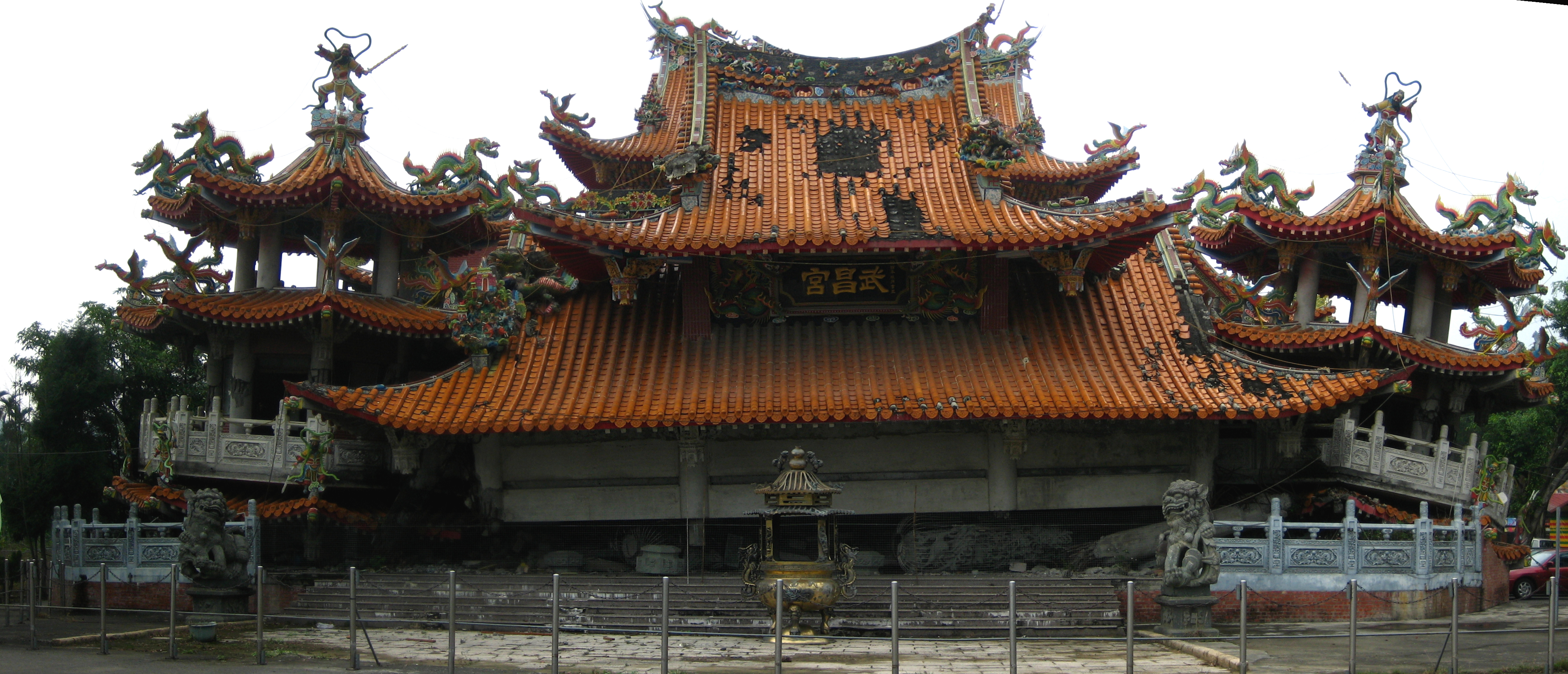
The collapsed Wuchang Temple (武昌宮) which serves as a reminder of the Jiji earthquake

- Jiji Rail Station
- Jiji Military History Park
- Jiji Weir
- Mingxin Academy
- Conservation Education Center
- Taiwan Water Museum

== Transportation ==
Jiji Township is served by Jiji Station and Longquan Station of Taiwan Railway Jiji line.
