= Ershui =

Rural township in Changhua County, Taiwan

Coordinates: 23°49′N 120°37′E

Ershui Township 二水鄉 Erhshui
- Rural township
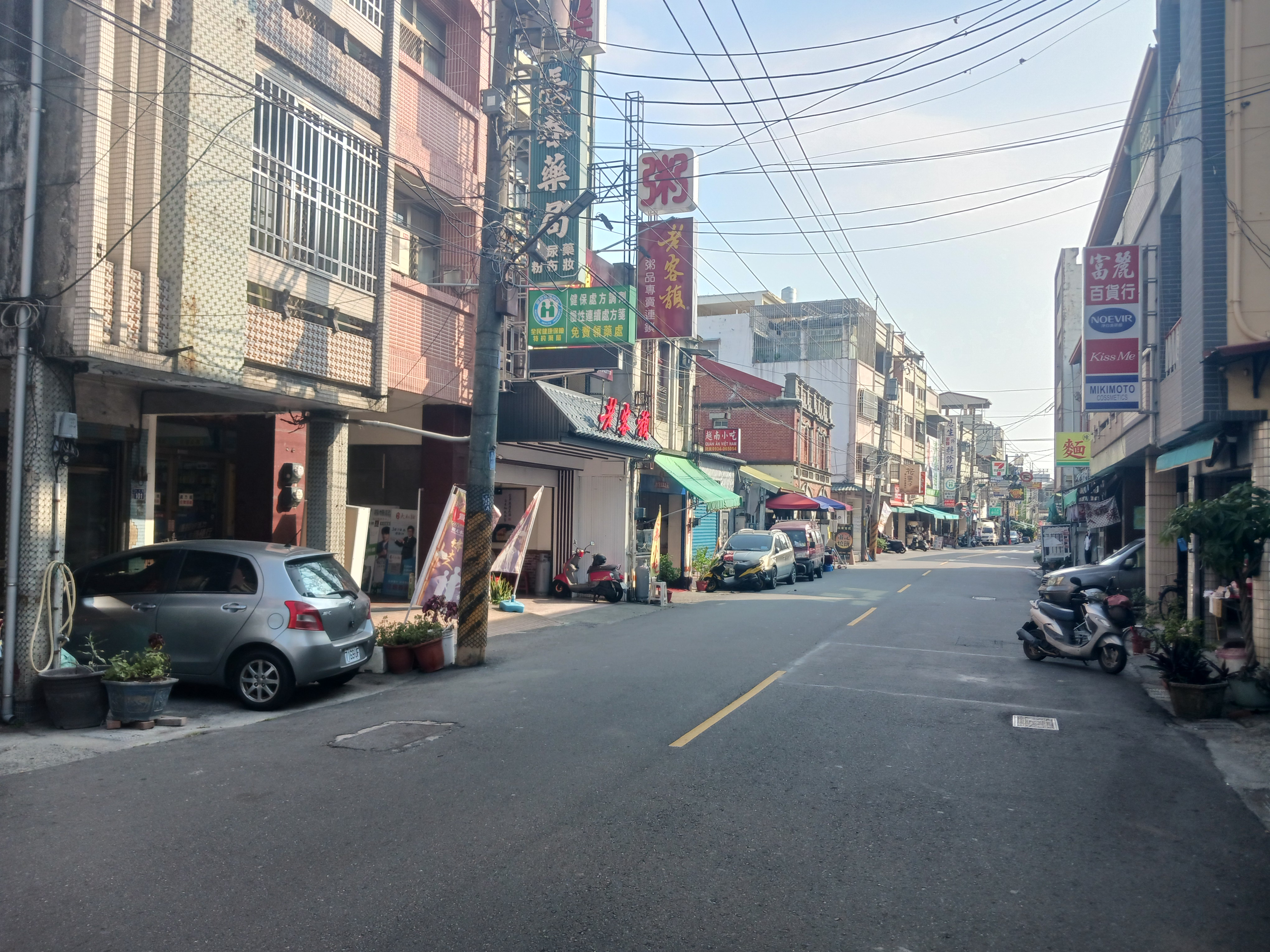

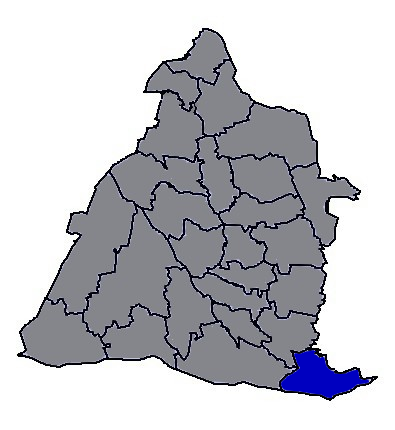
- Ershui Township in Changhua County
- Location: Changhua County, Taiwan

Area
  - Total: 29 km^{2} (11 sq mi)

Population (March 2023)
  - Total: 14,080
  - Density: 490/km^{2} (1,300/sq mi)
- Website: www.chcg.gov.tw/TSO/ershui/index.aspx (in Chinese)

Ershui Township (Chinese: 二水鄉; pinyin: Èrshuǐ Xiāng) is a rural township in southeastern Changhua County, Taiwan.

== Geography ==
Ershui is bordered on the north by Tianzhong Township, to the east by Mingjian Township in Nantou County, and to the west by Xizhou Township. Its name means, literally, "Two Waters", which is a reference to the two irrigation canals constructed in the township, Babao canal 1 and 2, linking the waters from the nearby Zhuoshui River to the fertile Changhua Plain. Ershui is known for its picturesque scenery and the nearby Bagua Mountain Range, and offers many biking and hiking trails. The bulk of Ershui's population lives near its central plaza in front of the Ershui railway station, on the Western Line on the Taiwan Railway's railway network.

Ershui encompasses 29.44 square kilometres (11.37 sq mi) and a population of 14,080, including 7,421 males and 6,659 females as of March 2023.

== History ==
The township's former name (Chinese: 二八水; Pe̍h-ōe-jī: Jī-pat-chuí; lit. 'two 'Pat' waters') refers to Babao canals 1 and 2, which take water from the Choshui River to irrigate the farmlands of Changhua. The canals are known as the "Mother Rivers of Changhua", spreading out in a fan-shaped distribution throughout Changhua county and creating a fertile plain for agriculture. During Japanese rule, the name was changed to Nisui Village (Japanese: 二水庄), which was modified to Ershui Township after Taiwan's handover to the Republic of China in 1945.

Records of habitation at Ershui has been documented all the way back to 1621, in the Ming dynasty. The first inhabitants first came from Fujian, mainland China to Lukang, Changhua County, and then to the foothills of the Bagua mountain range. The settlers co-existed with the indigenous people, and began farming, irrigated by spring water from the mountains. The population at that time was roughly 300.

After the construction of Babao canal 1 during Qing rule, the population spread outwards from the Bagua foothills towards the canal itself. Farms emerged on both sides of the canal, and this farming boom increased the population to 1700 people, or around 300 households. With the construction of the passenger and freight station, local businesses emerged on 1 km of the station front street, which was accelerated by the formal construction of the TRA Nisui Station in 1918. Finally, the construction of a pineapple canning plant in 1932 began an economic boom for Nisui, making it the most prosperous town in the Choshui River region at the time.

== Administrative divisions ==
The township comprises 17 villages: Changhe, Dayuan, Ershui, Fuxing, Gehe, Gexing, Guanghua, Guozun, Huimin, Shangli, Shenghua, Shiwu, Wenhua, Wuba, Xiuren, Yuanquan and Yumin.

== Tourist attractions ==
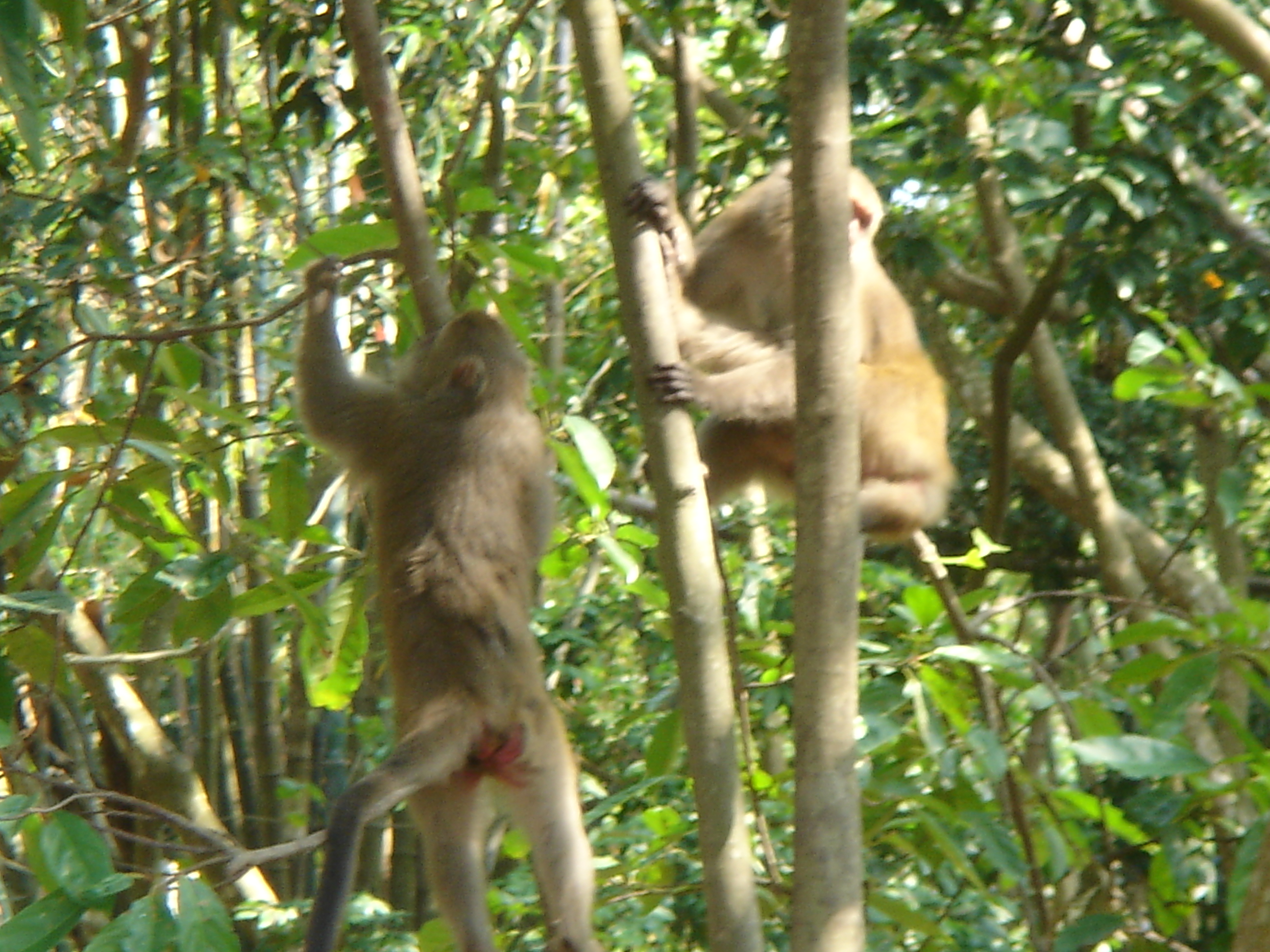
Formosan rock macaque monkeys on a hiking trail at the Songboling Recreation area.

A popular spot for tourists and locals alike is the nearby Songboling Recreational Area. The recreational area consists of hiking trails in the Bagua Mountain range, and stretches from Ershuei township into Tianzhong township to the north of it, as well as Mingjian township in Nantou.

The various trails in Songboling, known for their beauty and breathtaking scenery, are also known for the rock macaque monkeys which inhabit the woods along the trails. The population of these macaque monkeys have boomed after tourists began feeding them. However, the local rock macaque preservation society has urged people not to feed them, since it reduces their ability to forage on their own, and overpopulation can also cause starvation.

== Transportation ==
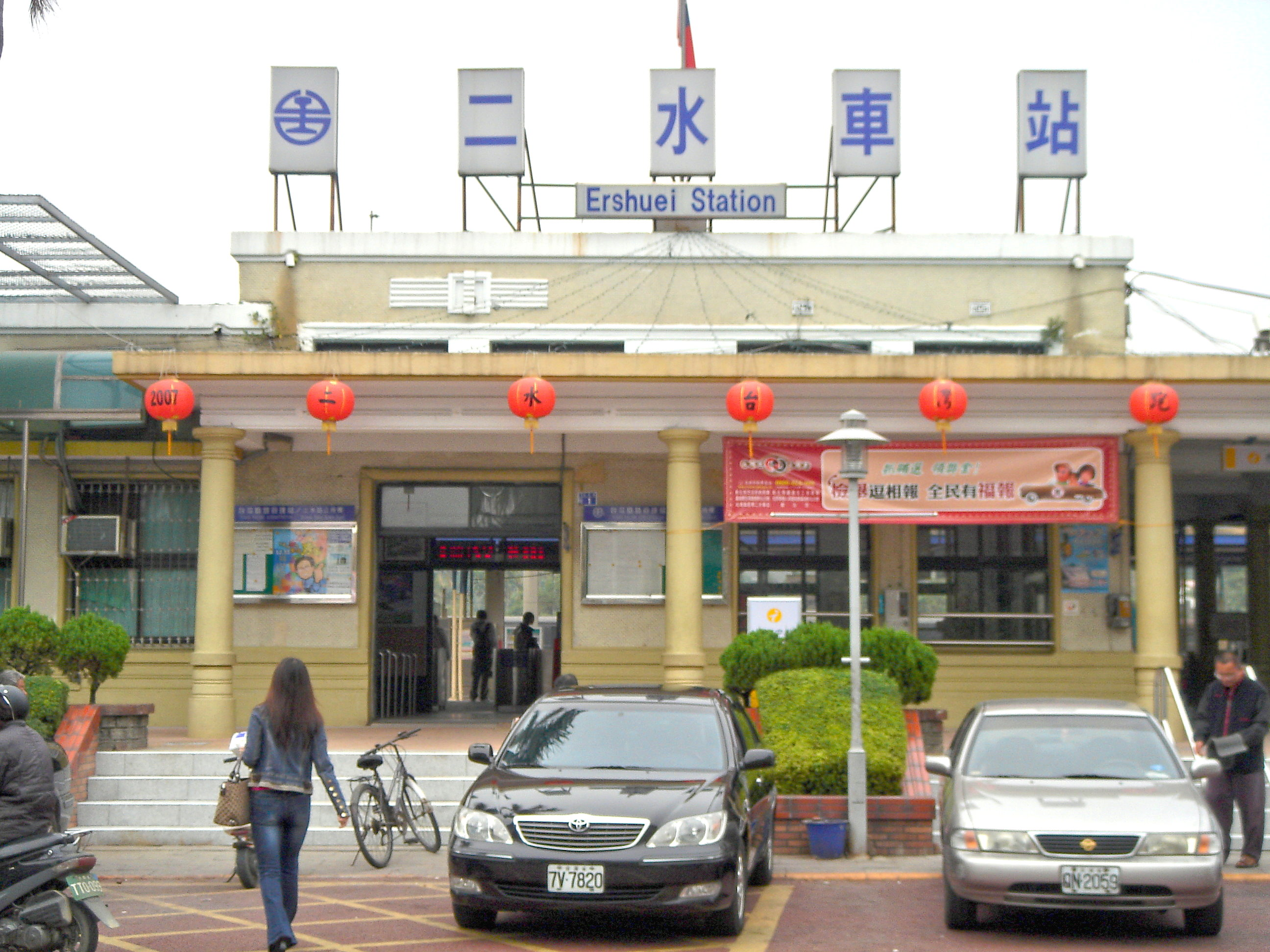
Ershuei's Train Station

The Ershui Station was established in 1918. The Ershui station is on the TR Western Line, and it is the transfer station for TR Branch Jiji Line railroad operated by the TR. It is designated as a second-tier train station in Taiwan Railway system.

== Notable natives ==
- Hsieh Tung-min, Vice President of the Republic of China (1978–1984)
- Timothy Yang, Secretary-General of the Presidential Office (2012-2015)
