= Shuili =

Rural township in Nantou County, Taiwan

Coordinates: 23°47′56″N 120°51′19″E

Shuili Township 水里鄉 Shueili
- Rural township
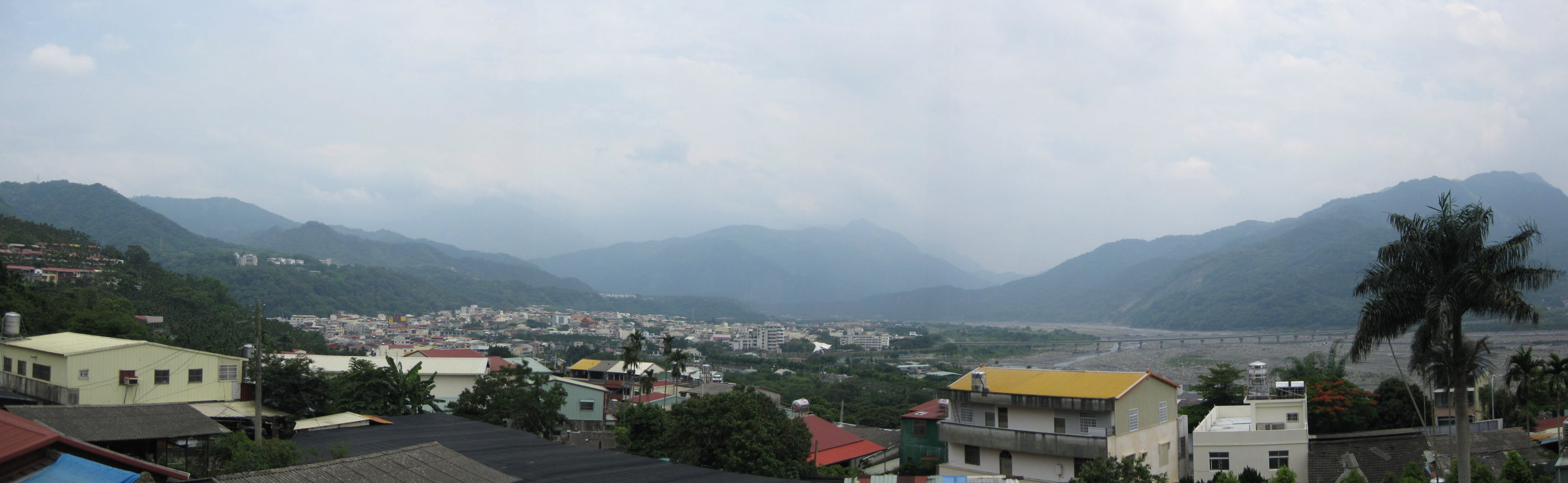

- Shuili Township in Nantou County
- Location: Nantou County, Taiwan

Area
  - Total: 107 km^{2} (41 sq mi)

Population (February 2023)
  - Total: 16,297
  - Density: 152/km^{2} (394/sq mi)

Shuili Township
- Chinese: 水里鄉
- Hanyu Pinyin: Shuǐlǐ Xiāng
- Wade–Giles: Shui^{3}-li^{3} Hsiang^{1}
- Tongyong Pinyin: Shuěilǐ Siang
- Pha̍k-fa-sṳ: Súi-lî-hiông
- Hokkien POJ: Chúi-lí-hiong

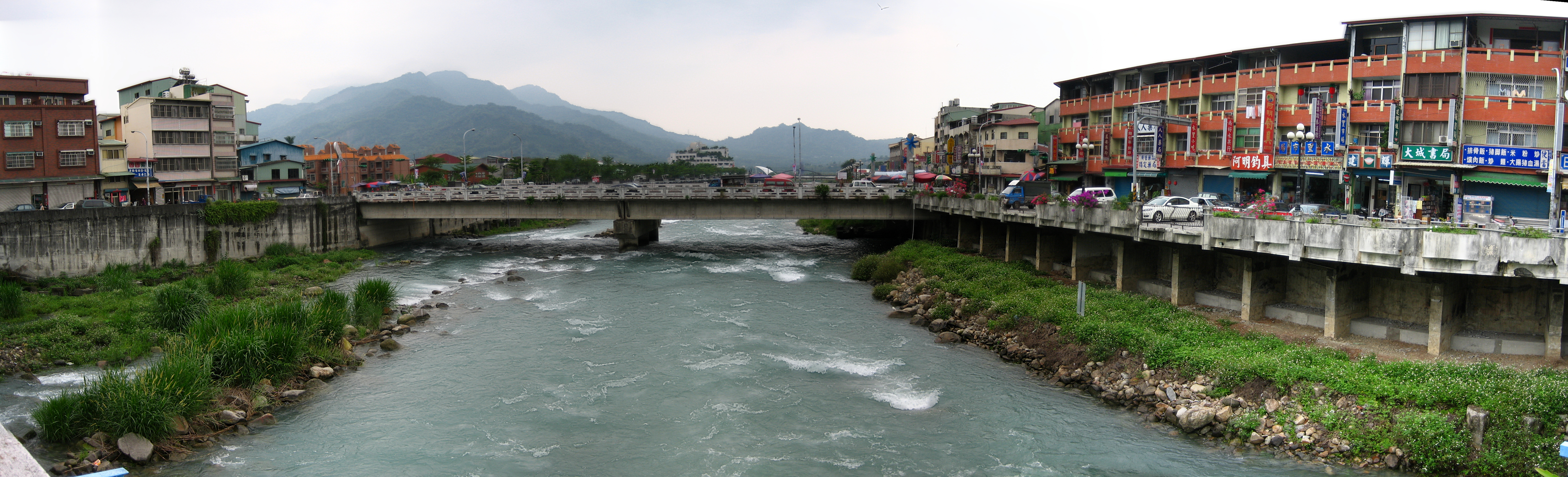
The Shuili River passing through downtown Shueili Township

Shuili Township is a rural township in Nantou County, Taiwan.

== Geography ==
It has a population total of 16,297 and an area of 106.8424 km^{2}.

== Administrative divisions ==
Shuili has 19 villages. Beipu, Chengzhong, Dingkan, Jucheng, Jugong, Junkeng, Minhe, Nanguang, Nongfu, Shangan, Shuili, Xincheng, Xinglong, Xinshan, Xinxing, Yongfeng, Yongxing, Yufeng and Zhongyang Village.

== Tourist attractions ==
- Minghu Dam
- Mingtan Dam
- Shuili River
- Shuili Snake Kiln Ceramics Cultural Park
- Checheng Wood Museum
- Mei Agriculture Recreational Area
- Stone Guanyin Suspension Bridge
- Yiqing Winery

== Transportation ==
=== Rail ===
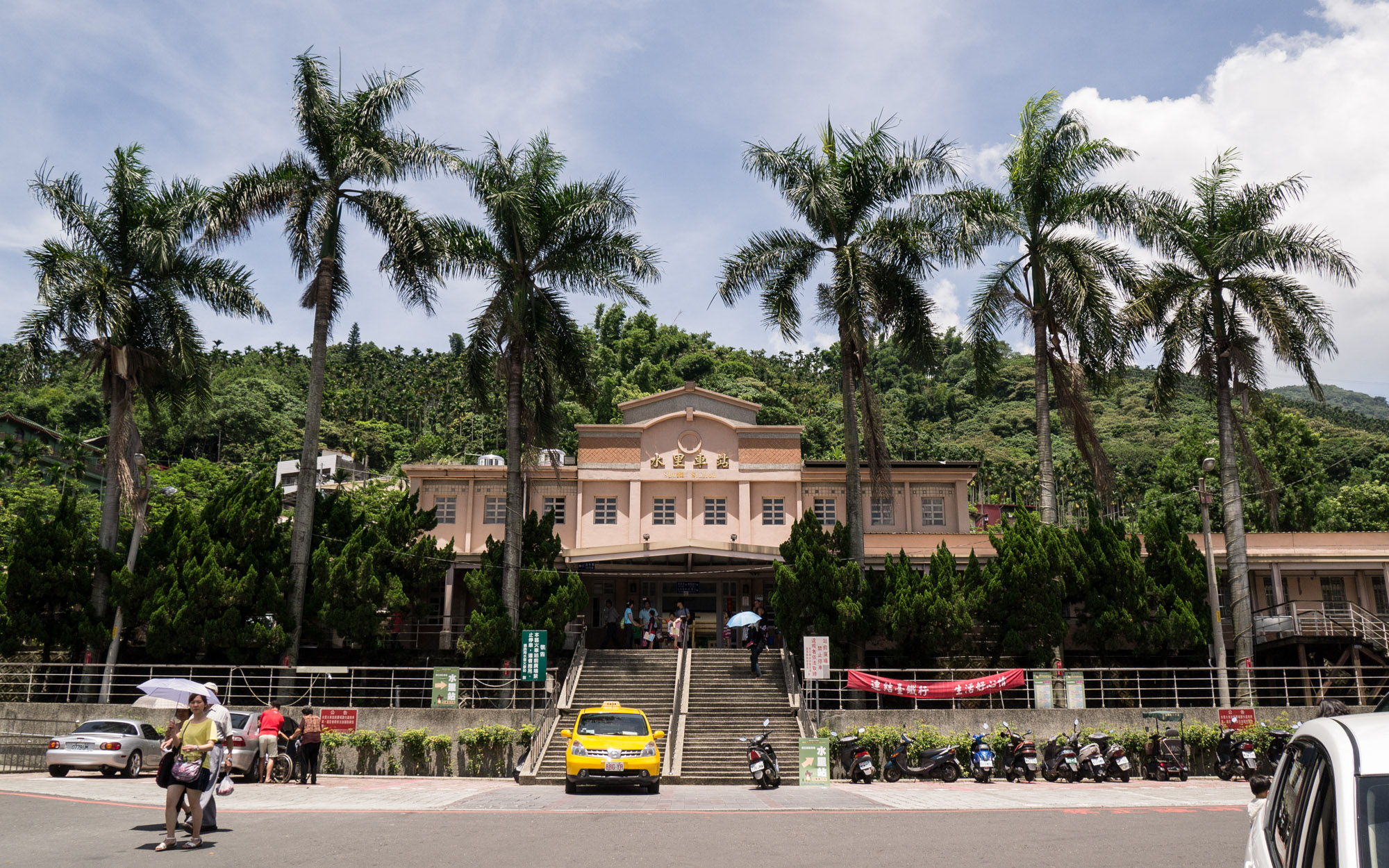
Shuili Rail Station

Shuili Township is accessible by Shuili Station and Checheng Station of Taiwan Railway Jiji Line.

=== Bus ===
Shuili Township is served by Yuanlin Bus, All Day Bus, Green Transit Bus and Nantou Bus.

== Notable natives ==
- Hsiao Chia-chi, Deputy Secretary-General of Executive Yuan (2014)

== See also ==
- Nantou County
