= Mount Danda =

Mountain in Nantou and Hualien, Taiwan

- Location within Taiwan

Highest point
- Elevation: 3,340 m (10,960 ft)
- Coordinates: 23°36′02″N 121°12′48″E

Geography
- Location: Hualien County and Nantou County, Taiwan
- Parent range: Central Mountain Range

Mount Danda or Mount Dan (Chinese: 丹大山; pinyin: dāndàshān) is a mountain in Taiwan with an elevation of 3,340 m (10,960 ft).

== See also ==
- List of mountains in Taiwan
