= Mingjian =

Rural township in Nantou County, Taiwan

Coordinates: 23.851°N 120.6775°E

Mingjian Township 名間鄉 Nama
- Rural township
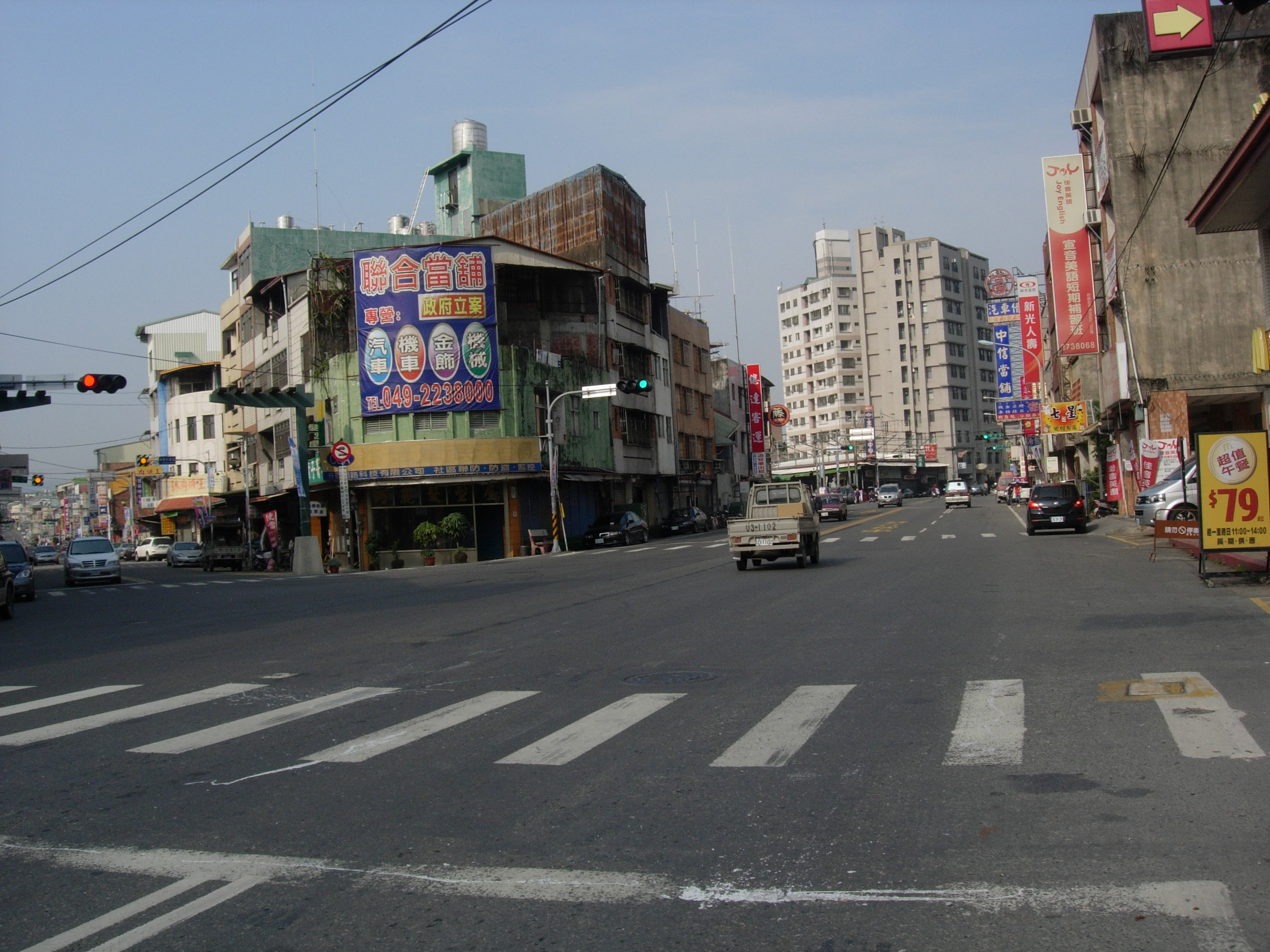

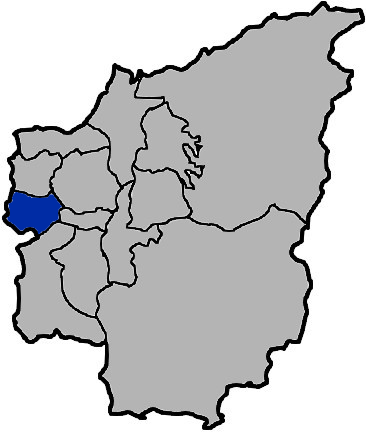
- Mingjian Township in Nantou County
- Location: Nantou County, Taiwan

Area
  - Total: 83 km^{2} (32 sq mi)

Population (February 2023)
  - Total: 36,127
  - Density: 440/km^{2} (1,100/sq mi)

Mingjian Township
- Chinese: 名間鄉
- Hanyu Pinyin: Míngjiān Xiāng
- Wade–Giles: Ming^{2}-chien^{1} Hsiang^{1}
- Tongyong Pinyin: Míngjiān Siang
- Pha̍k-fa-sṳ: Miàng-kiên-hiông
- Hokkien POJ: Bêng-kan-hiong

Mingjian Township is a rural township in western Nantou County, Taiwan. It is the second smallest township in the county, after Jiji Township.

== Name and etymology ==
The name Mingjian originates from a Japanese transliteration of the original Taiwanese Hokkien name, Làm-á (Chinese: 湳仔; pinyin: Nǎnzǎi), with literal meaning "a very wet place". In 1920, during Japanese rule, the name was changed to Nama (名間) which closely matched the Taiwanese pronunciation but with different kanji (Chinese characters) for the name. This written form was retained after the Kuomintang takeover of Taiwan in 1945; the characters are pronounced Bêng-kan and Míngjiān in Taiwanese and Mandarin Chinese, respectively.

== History ==
Mingjian was a hunting ground for the Taiwanese aborigines.

In 2008, the 100th congregation of the Church of Jesus Christ of Latter-day Saints in Taiwan was organized in Mingjian.

A leaning unused electrical pylon damaged in the 1999 Jiji earthquake, has been turned into an earthquake memorial.

== Administrative divisions ==
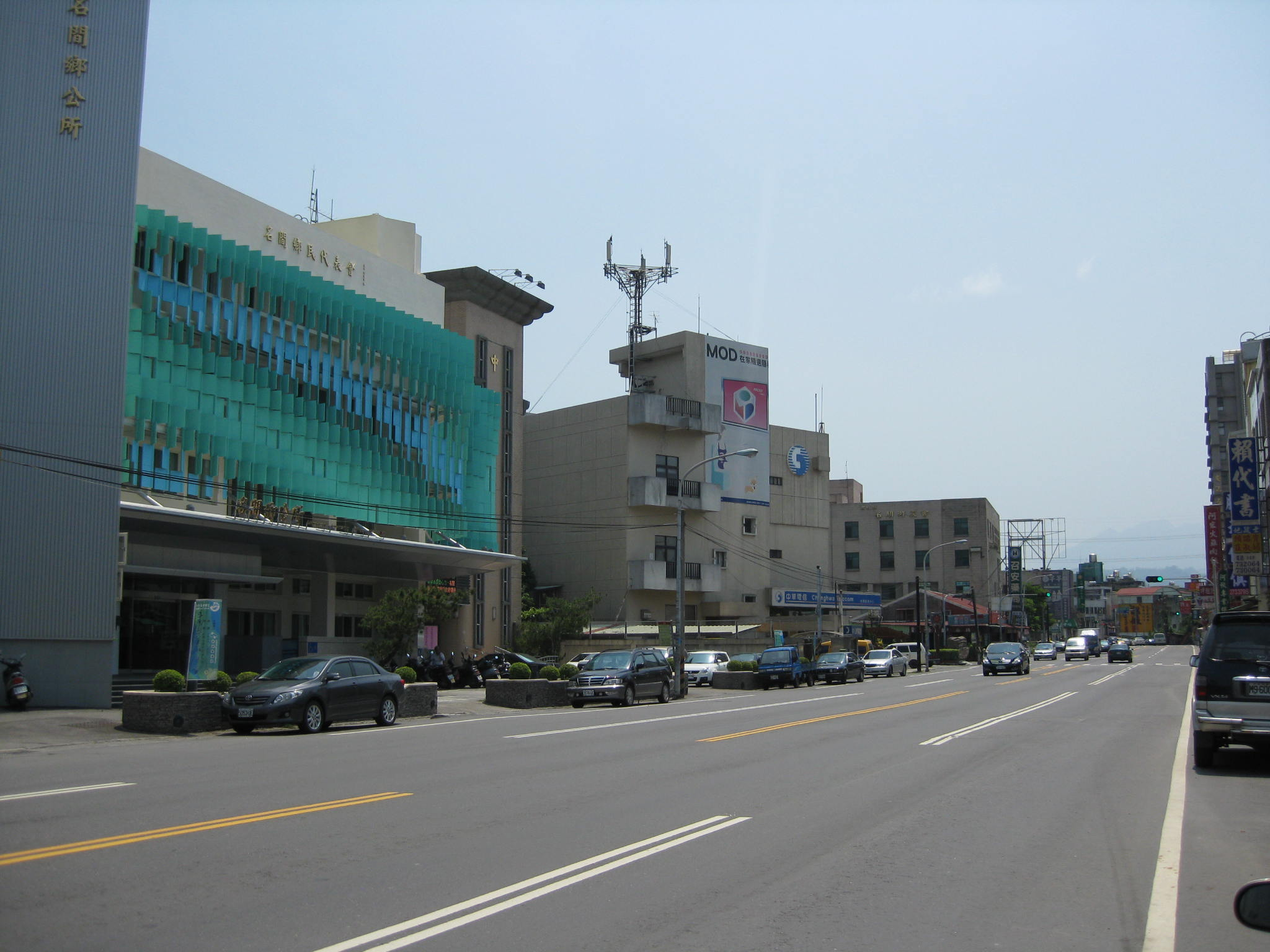
Mingjian Township office

Mingjian includes the villages of Buxia (廍下), Chishui (赤水), Dakeng (大坑), Dazhuang (大庄), Donghu (東湖), Kanjiao (崁腳), Nanya (南雅), Puzhong (埔中), Renhe (仁和), Sanlun (三崙), Songbo (松柏), Songshan (松山), Tanliao (炭寮), Tianzi (田仔), Wandan (萬丹), Xincuo (新厝) Xinguang (新光), Xinjie (新街), Xinmin (新民), Zhongshan (中山), Zhongzheng (中正), Zhuoshui (濁水), Zhuwei (竹圍).

== Transportation ==
- TRA Zhuoshui Station

== Notable natives ==
- Chen Cheng-sheng, member of Legislative Yuan (1999-2002)
