= Checheng railway station =

Railway station in Nantou County, Taiwan

Checheng Station 車埕車站
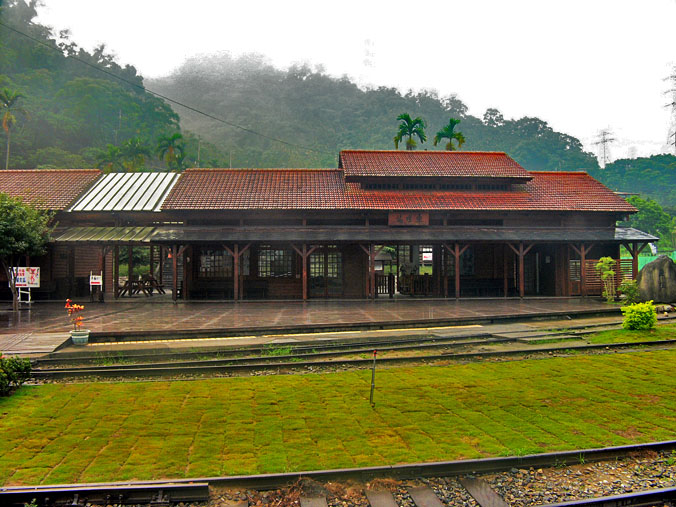

General information
- Location: Shuili, Nantou County, Taiwan
- Coordinates: 23°49′57.4″N 120°51′58.0″E
- System: Train station
- Owner: Taiwan Railway Corporation
- Operator: Taiwan Railway Corporation
- Line: Jiji
- Train operators: Taiwan Railway Corporation

History
- Opened: 14 January 1922
- Former names: Waichecheng

Passengers
- 150 daily (2024)

Services
Preceding station	Taiwan Railway	Following station
Shuili towards Ershui	Jiji line	Terminus
Location

Checheng (traditional Chinese: 車埕車站; simplified Chinese: 车埕车站; pinyin: Chēchéng Chēzhàn) is a terminus on the Taiwan Railway (TR) Jiji line located in Shuili Township, Nantou County, Taiwan.

== History ==
The station was originally established on 14 January 1922 as Waichecheng Station (Chinese: 外車埕驛; pinyin: Wàichēchéng Yì). It was then renamed to Checheng in 1961.

== Around the station ==
- Mingtan Dam

== See also ==
- List of railway stations in Taiwan
