= Ershui railway station =

Railway station located in Changhua, Taiwan

Ershui 二水車站
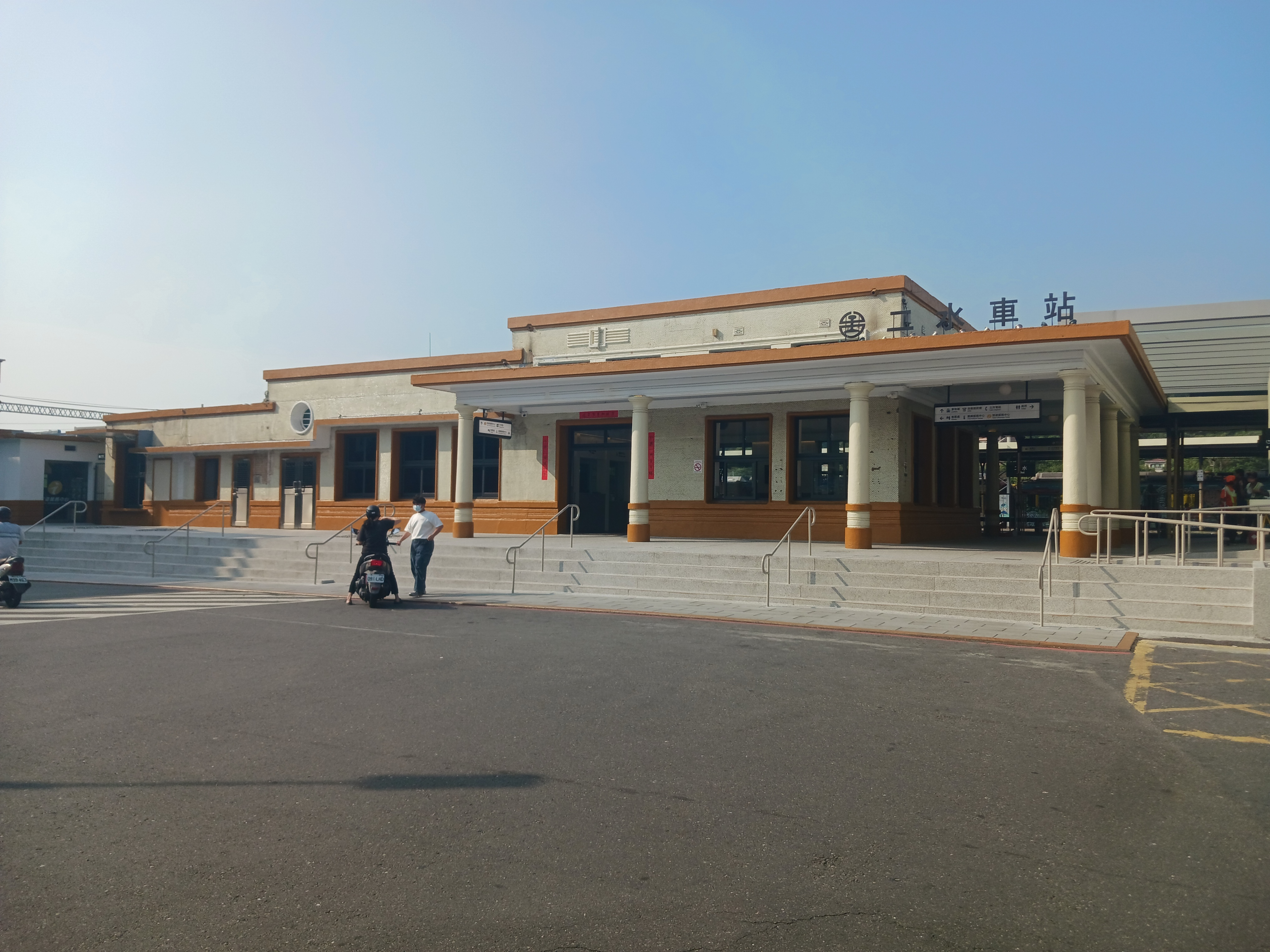
- The station in June 2026

General information
- Location: Ershui, Changhua County, Taiwan
- Coordinates: 23°48′47.5″N 120°37′6.3″E
- System: Railway station
- Owner: Taiwan Railway
- Operator: Taiwan Railway
- Line: Western Trunk line
- Train operators: Taiwan Railway

History
- Opened: 15 January 1905

Passengers
- 2,068 daily (2024)

Services
Preceding station	Taiwan Railway	Following station
Terminus	Jiji line	Yuanquan towards Checheng
Tianzhong towards Keelung	Western Trunk line	Linnei towards Kaohsiung
Location

Ershui station (also Ershuei station; Chinese: 二水車站; Hanyu Pinyin: Èrshuǐ Chēzhàn; Tongyong Pinyin: Èrshuěi Chejhàn) is a railway station of Taiwan Railway West Coast line located in Ershui Township, Changhua County, Taiwan. It is also the western terminus of the Jiji line.

== History ==
Ershui station was opened on 15 January 1905 as Erbashuei station (二八水驛), and adopted its current name on 10 January 1920. The current building was opened in 1935.

== Structure ==
There is one side platform and one island platform.

Taiwan Railways Administration (TRA)
Tianzhong ⇐ West Coast line ⇒ Linnei
Jiji line ⇒ Yuanquan

== See also ==
- List of railway stations in Taiwan
