= Batongguan Historic Trail =

Qing-era footpath traversing Taiwan's Central Mountain Range

- 八通關古道 (Chinese)
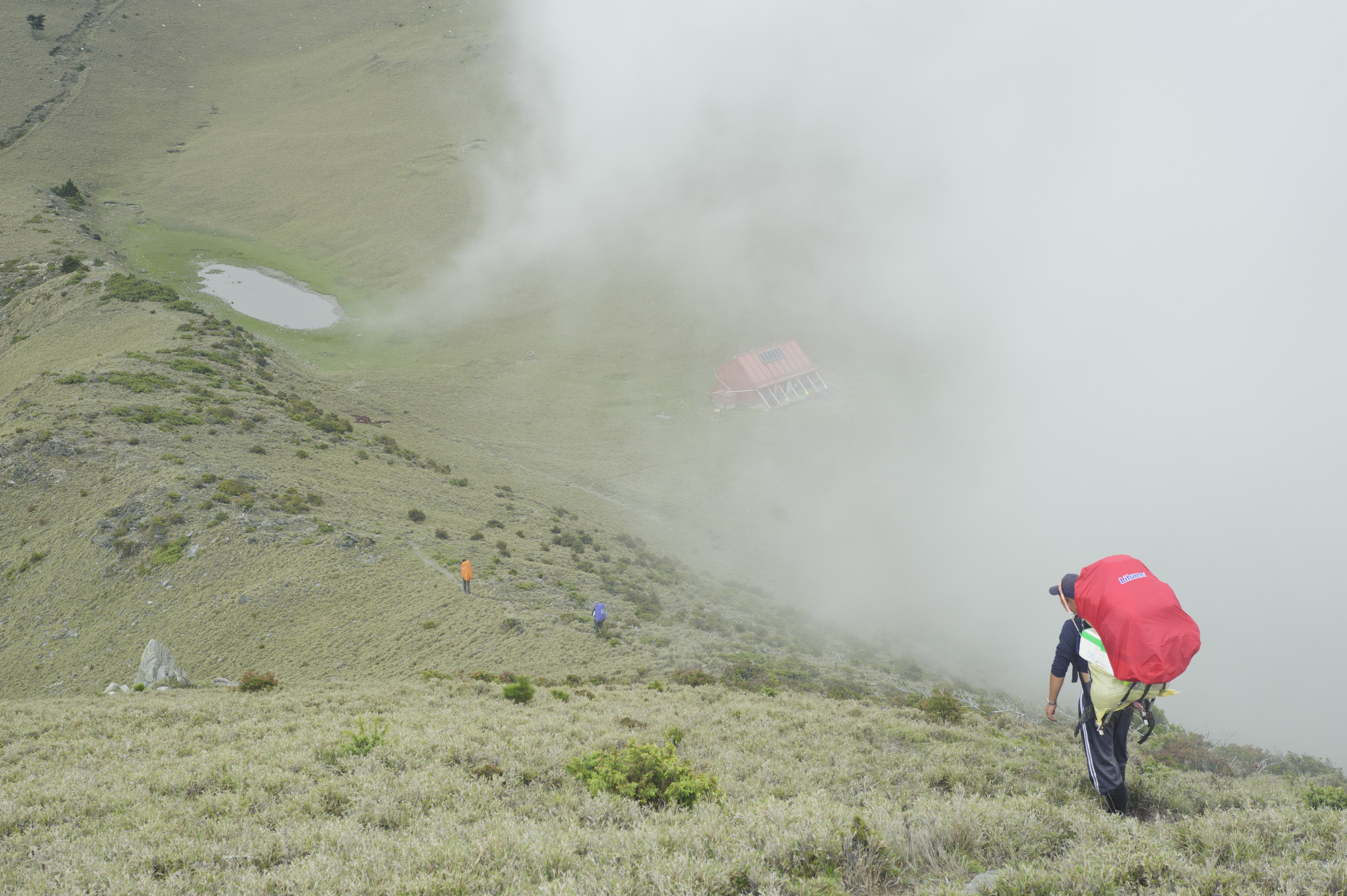
- A hiker on the trail in Dashuiku, located at the border between Nantou and Hualien counties
- Type: Trail
- Location: Zhushan, Nantou to Yuli, Hualien, Taiwan

History
- Built: November 1875

National monument of Taiwan
- Type: Plaque
- Designated: April 17, 1987

Batongguan Historic Trail (traditional Chinese: 八通關古道; simplified Chinese: 八通关古道; pinyin: Bātōngguān Gǔdào; romanized: Pattonkan Kodō) is the name of two trails crossing the Central Mountain Range from Zhushan, Nantou to Yuli, Hualien in Taiwan. The first iteration of the trail was built in the Qing dynasty and was abandoned; a second was built in the Japanese era. Both were built for the government to control the indigenous population living in the mountains. Though the two trails rarely overlap, they are often referred to by the same name.

== Qing dynasty trail ==
In 1871, Ryukyuan sailors traveling home from Shuri to Miyako-jima shipwrecked off the southeast coast of Taiwan. They were killed by the local Paiwan people in what is known as the Mudan incident. In retaliation, in 1874, Japan invaded and occupied Taiwan for a few months. After the incident, the governing Qing realized how little control they had over remote regions of the island; they sent Shen Baozhen to Taiwan, who proposed building three east–west trails across the Central Mountain Range. Shen hoped that these trails would encourage Han people to live in the mountains to better subjugate the indigenous population as well as strengthen the Qing dynasty's hold on the island.

In 1875, Shen ordered Wu Guangliang, a military officer, to construct the middle path. Wu started in January at Zhushan (Note: Formerly 林圮埔 (Línpǐpǔ)) and worked his way east. They first crossed over Fenghuang Mountain (Note: 鳳凰山 (Fènghuáng Shān); in modernday Lugu Township) to Aiguo (Note: 愛國 (Àiguó), formerly 茅埔 (Máopǔ); in modern day Xinyi Township) on the banks of the Chenyoulan River, then followed the river to Dongpu. (Note: 東埔 (Dōngpǔ); in modern-day Xinyi Township) From here, they ascended up the Central Mountain Range. When they reached Dashuiku (Note: 大水窟 (Dàshuǐkū); at the modern-day border of Xinyi Township, Nantou County and Zhuoxi Township, Hualien County) in July, Wu looked at the treacherous terrain ahead decided to call for another team led by Deng Guozhi (鄧國志) to start at the east in Yuli (Note: Formerly 璞石閣 (Púshígé)) and build the road westwards. The trail was completed (EDIT: the reconnaissance of the trail was completed in 6 months or so, the creation of the trail must have taken longer than one year???) in November 1875 for a total length of 265 km (165 mi).

After the trail's completion, Wu set up a military camp in Ruisui (Note: Formerly 水尾 (Shuǐwěi)) to establish a stronger Qing presence in the Huadong Valley. The Qing lifted restrictions that barred the Han from moving east, and Ding Richang even offered money and tools to encourage settlers. However, most Han people did not dare to travel further west than Dongpu due to the rough terrain and the presence of indigenous tribes. The Qing dynasty also struggled to govern the Huadong Valley; Wu and his successors frequently ran into conflicts with the Amis living on the plains, and corruption was also rampant among Qing officers. Due to high costs of maintaining the trail, on October 24, 1891, newly appointed governor of Taiwan Liu Mingchuan decided to abandon the trail from Dongpu to Yuli. Around this time, a much flatter path bypassing Fenghuang Mountain through modern-day Shuili was built, and the trail between Zhushan and Aiguo was rendered obsolete.

== Japanese era trail ==
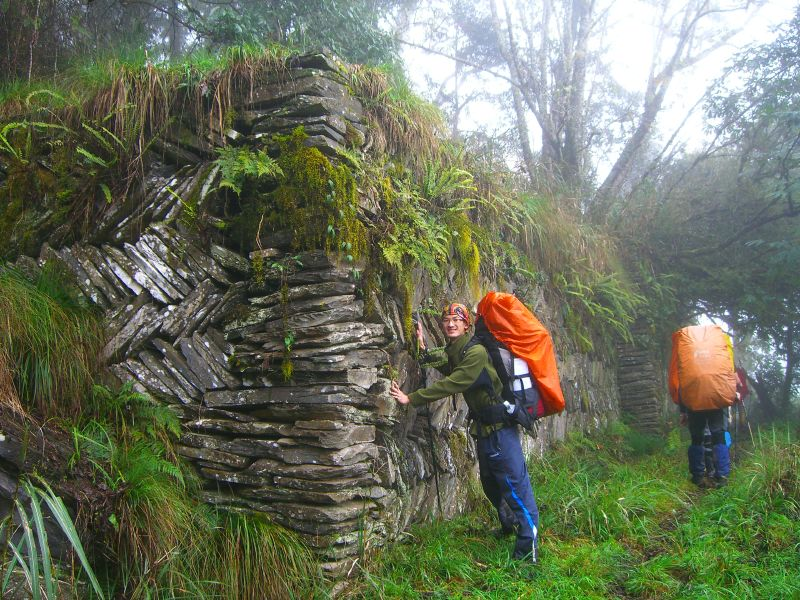
A hiker poses with the stone wall ruins at Tomiri, a former police outpost.

When Japan took control over Taiwan in 1895, the Imperial Japanese Army General Staff Office sent a lieutenant named Nagano Yoshitora (長野義虎) to walk the trail from Yuli. Nagano took seventeen days to trek the abandoned trail to Zhushan. Some claim that he climbed Yu Shan during this trip, which would make him the first person to do so, but this claim is disputed.

In the 1910s, indigenous headhunting raids on Japanese and Han people were become increasingly problematic. Notably, indigenous and Japanese clashes during the Dafen Incident prompted the government to consider reconstructing the trail. In June 1919, the Taishō government sent two teams, one beginning in Zhushan and the other in Yuli, to build a trail that roughly follows the abandoned route. During the construction, the Japanese and indigenous laborers were often attacked by other indigenous tribes, resulting in high casualties. Nevertheless, the eastern team reached the Dashuiku in January 1921, and the western team arrived in March the same year.

The Japanese road was significantly easier to travel on compared the Qing one, such that goods could be transported across by a pushcart. Police were stationed at many points along the trail, and some of these stations were even equipped with lodging for traders and hikers. However, the number of travelers dwindled when the Japanese forcefully moved the Bunun out of the mountains to prevent further uprisings, and the trail's condition deteriorated quickly.

== Republic of China era ==
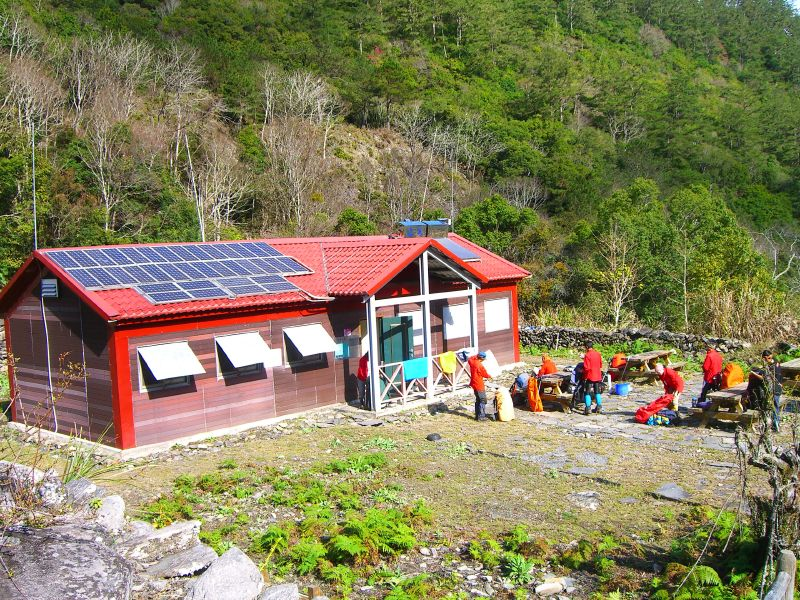
A lodge at Dafen. The site was a former Bunun settlement and Japanese police outpost.

After Japanese rule in Taiwan ended in 1949, the Forestry Bureau reported that very few people still lived along the trail, and many bridges have already collapsed due to typhoons. Some parts of the trail were repaired in 1949 to transport gold from mines near the top, but the trail's surface was significantly worse, and goods had to be carried by hand. In 1951, all wooden Japanese-era outposts (except for one at Huabanuo (Note: 華巴諾 (Huábānuò); in modern-day Zhuoxi Township)) were burned down by the government, citing safety reasons.

When Yushan National Park was created in 1985, the government began restoring the trail and its bridges. Now, the western section of the Batongguan Trail is frequently used by hikers summiting the 100 Peaks of Taiwan, including Yu Shan, the tallest mountain in Taiwan; lodges are built on former police outpost sites. Provincial Highway 30 follows roughly the same route of the trail from Yuli, though it terminates abruptly in Shanfeng.

== Relics ==
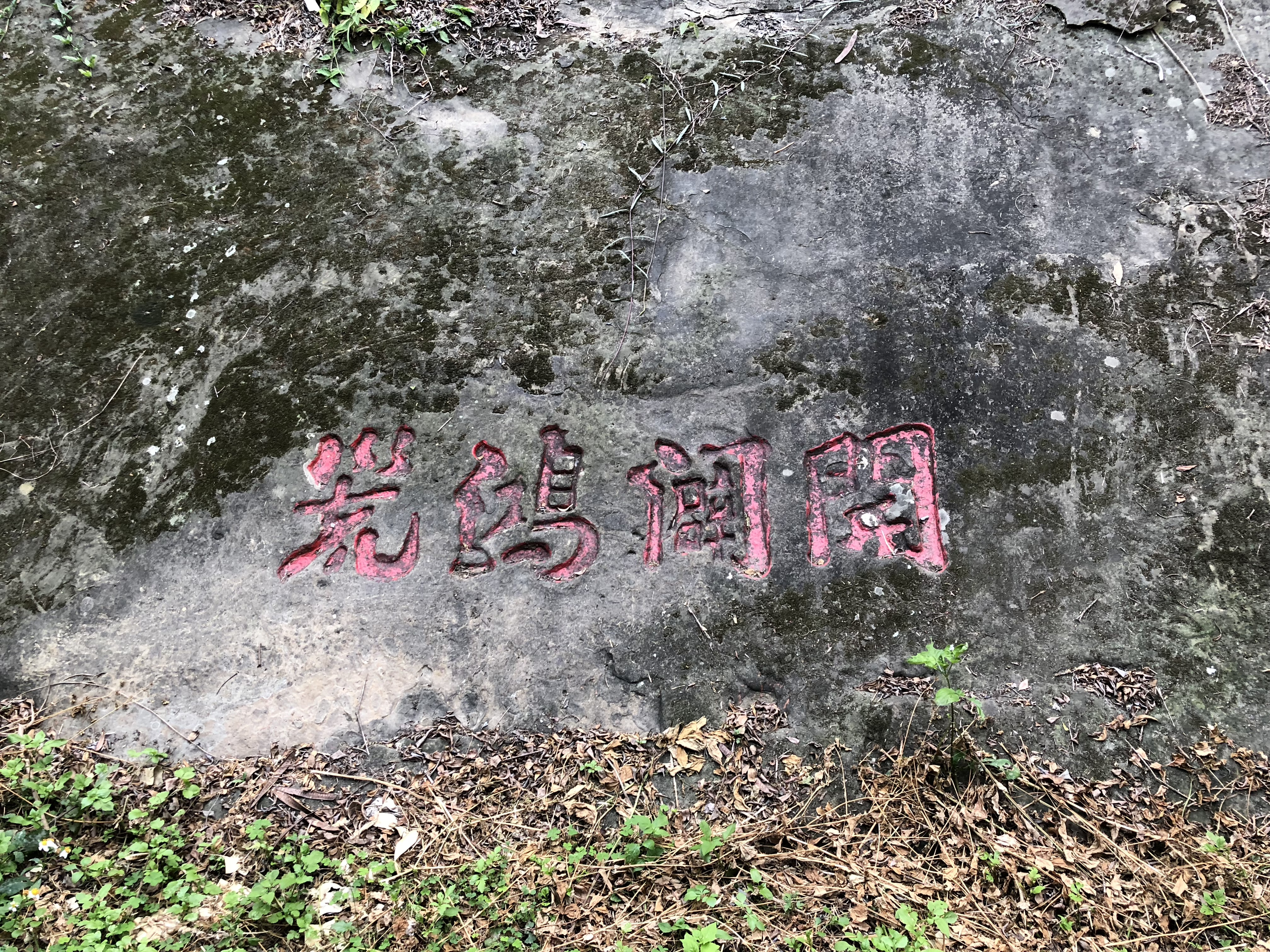
The Kāipì Hōnghuāng inscription in Jiji.

Batongguan Trail is registered as a national monument of Taiwan since 1987 to preserve the following relics dating from the Qing dynasty:

- Kāipì Hōnghuāng (開闢鴻荒): An inscription located on a rock surface in Jiji. The inscription translates to "settle in the wilderness" and is attributed to Wu Guangliang. Jiji Weir was designed to bypass the inscription.
- Huàjí Mánmuò (化及蠻貊): An inscription on a large rock in Jiji. The inscription translates to "subjugate the foreign people" and commemorates the spur trail between Shuili and Dongpu. The inscription is signed by two officers named Chen Fangbo (陳方伯) and Chen Shilie (陳世烈).
- Wànnián Hēngqú (萬年亨衢): An inscription on a large rock in Lugu. The inscription translates to "accessible for ten thousand years" and commemorates the completion of the trail to Fenghuang Mountain. The relic was damaged in Typhoon Toraji in 2001.
- Shāntōng Dàhǎi (山通大海): An inscription on a rock on the banks of the Chenyoulan River in Xinyi. The inscription translates to "connecting the mountains with the sea." The original was lost in a flood in 1959. It was remade in 1988, only to be covered in a landslide during Typhoon Toraji in 2001.
- Shèngjītíng (聖蹟亭): A small stone tower for burning joss paper in Lugu. The tower was hit by a car in 1990 and not repaired until 2001.
- Announcement of removing restrictions for entering the mountains (入山撤禁告示碑): A small stone plaque announcing the loosening of restrictions on Han people from settling east onto indigenous land. Currently placed next to Fu'an Temple, a Tudigong temple in Lugu.
- Dépiàn Shānzōu (德遍山陬): A small stone plaque created by Lugu residents as a gift to Wu Guangliang. Currently housed next to Fu'an Temple.

There was a stone plaque inscribed with Guòhuà Cúnshén (過化存神) that was placed on top of Batongguan Mountain, but has been lost since the Japanese era.
