= Wujie Dam =

Dam in Ren'ai, Nantou County, Taiwan

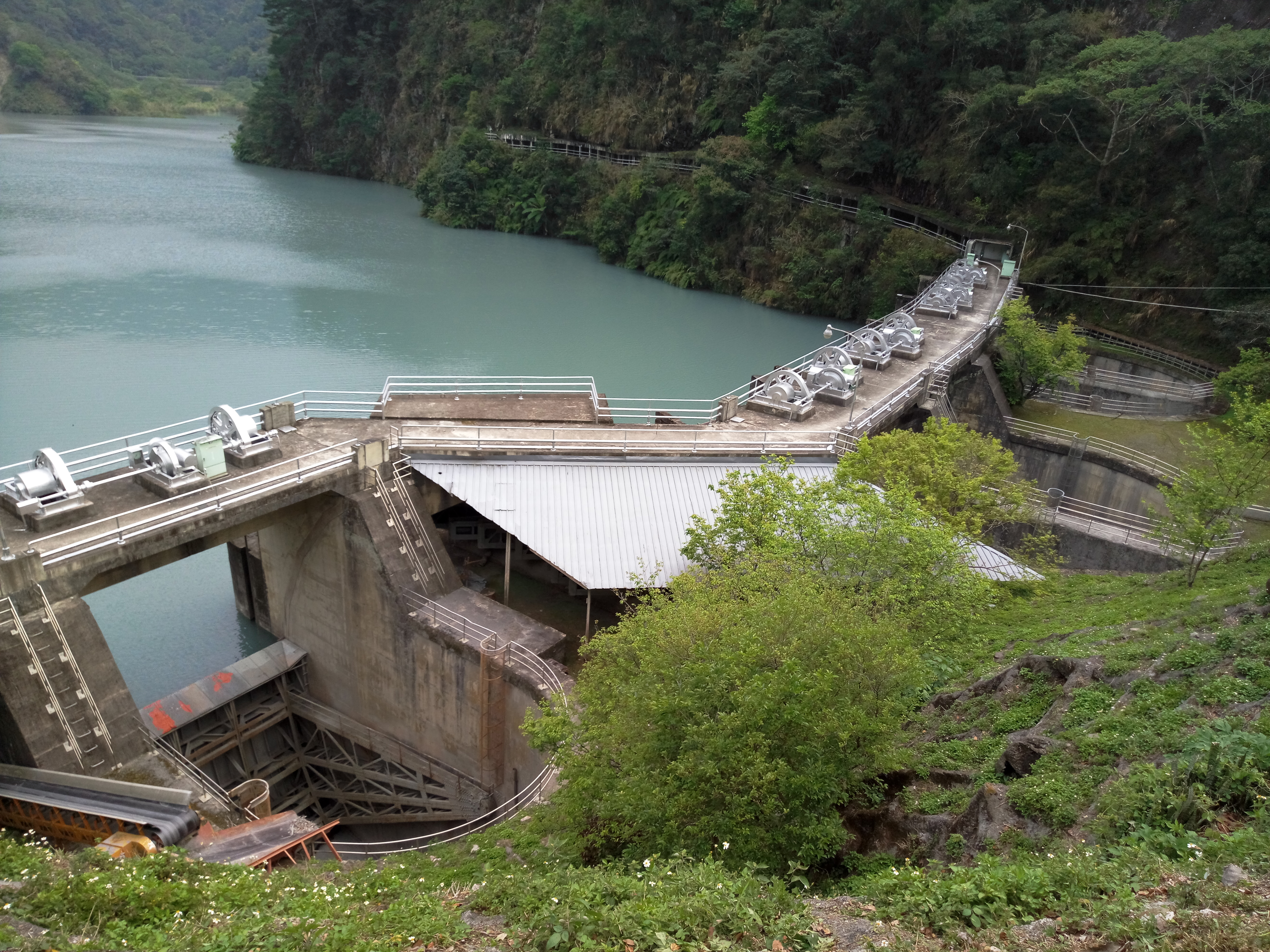
- Interactive map of Wujie Dam
- Official name: 武界壩
- Location: Ren'ai, Nantou County, Taiwan
- Coordinates: 23°54′54″N 121°03′26″E
- Status: Operational
- Construction began: 1919; 107 years ago
- Opening date: 1934; 92 years ago

Dam and spillways
- Type of dam: Diversion dam
- Impounds: Zhuoshui River
- Length: 86.5 m (284 ft)
- Spillways: 6
- Spillway capacity: 3,150 m^{3}/s

Reservoir
- Total capacity: 14,000,000 m^{3}

Wujie Dam (Chinese: 武界壩; pinyin: Wǔjiè Bà) is a concrete gravity dam on the Zhuoshui River in Ren'ai Township, Nantou County, Taiwan. The dam was built in two stages, from 1919 to 1922 and 1927–1934, and serves primarily to divert water from the Zhuoshui River to a storage reservoir at Sun Moon Lake and its associated hydroelectric projects (Mingtan Pumped Storage Hydro Power Plant and Minhu Pumped Storage Hydro Power Station). During the Japanese occupation of Taiwan it was known as Bukai Dam.

The dam is located in a narrow gorge about 15 kilometres (9.3 mi) northeast of Sun Moon Lake. It is 57.6 metres (189 ft) high and 86.5 m (284 ft) long, forming a reservoir with a design capacity of 14,000,000 m^{3} (11,000 acre⋅ft), now mostly silted up. The diversion tunnel to Sun Moon Lake has a diameter of 3 m (9.8 ft), with a diversion capacity of 40.35 m^{3}/s (1,425 cu ft/s). The spillway of the dam consists of six gates with a capacity of 3,150 m^{3}/s (111,000 cu ft/s).

== See also ==
- List of dams and reservoirs in Taiwan
- Wushoh Dam
