= Wushe Dam =

Dam in Ren'ai, Nantou County, Taiwan

Wushe Dam 霧社壩
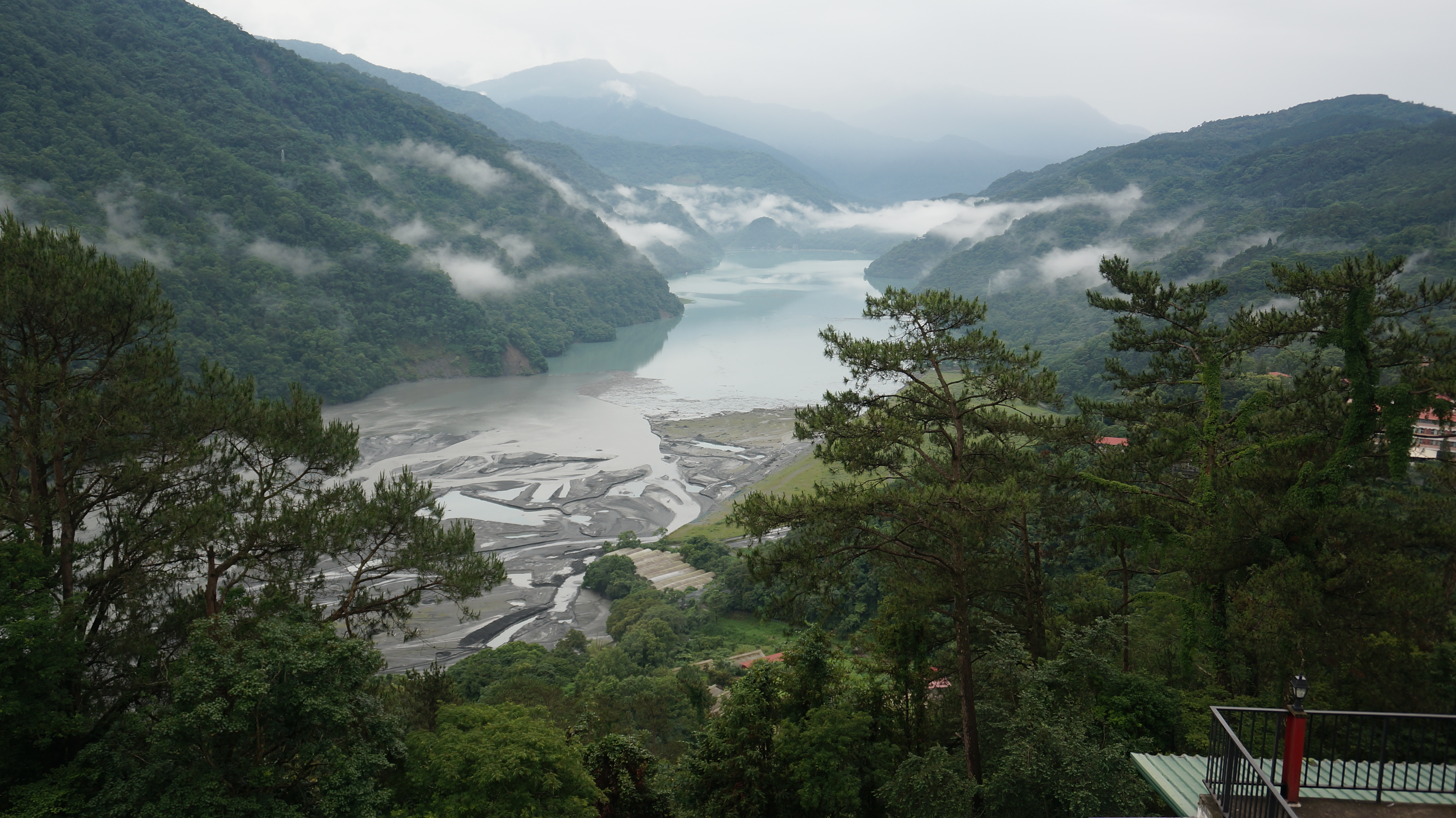
- Wushe Reservoir

- Location within Nantou County
- Country: Taiwan
- Coordinates: 23°58′51″N 121°08′21″E
- Status: In use
- Construction began: 1939; 87 years ago
- Opening date: 1960; 66 years ago
- Owner: Taiwan Power Company

Dam and spillways
- Type of dam: arch-gravity dam
- Impounds: Wushe Creek
- Height: 114.6 m (376 ft)
- Length: 205 m (673 ft)

Reservoir
- Creates: Wushe Reservoir
- Total capacity: 146,000,000 m^{3} (118,000 acre⋅ft) (nominal); 54,390,000 m^{3} (44,090 acre⋅ft) (2011 survey)
- Catchment area: 219 km^{2} (85 mi^{2})
- Surface area: 2.84 km^{2} (700 acres)

Power Station
- Turbines: 2x 20.7 MW Francis-type; 1x 19.7 MW Francis-type
- Installed capacity: 61.1 MW
- Annual generation: 182,000,000 KWh

Wushe Dam (Chinese: 霧社壩; pinyin: Wùshè Bà) is a gravity dam forming Wushe Reservoir (霧社水庫; Wùshè Shuǐkù), also called Wanda Reservoir (萬大水庫; Wàndà Shuǐkù) and Bihu (碧湖; Bìhú), on the Wushe Creek (霧社溪; Wùshè Xī), a tributary of the Zhuoshui River, located in Ren-ai Township, Nantou County, Taiwan. The dam was completed in 1960 after seven years of construction and mainly serves to generate hydroelectric power.

== Background ==
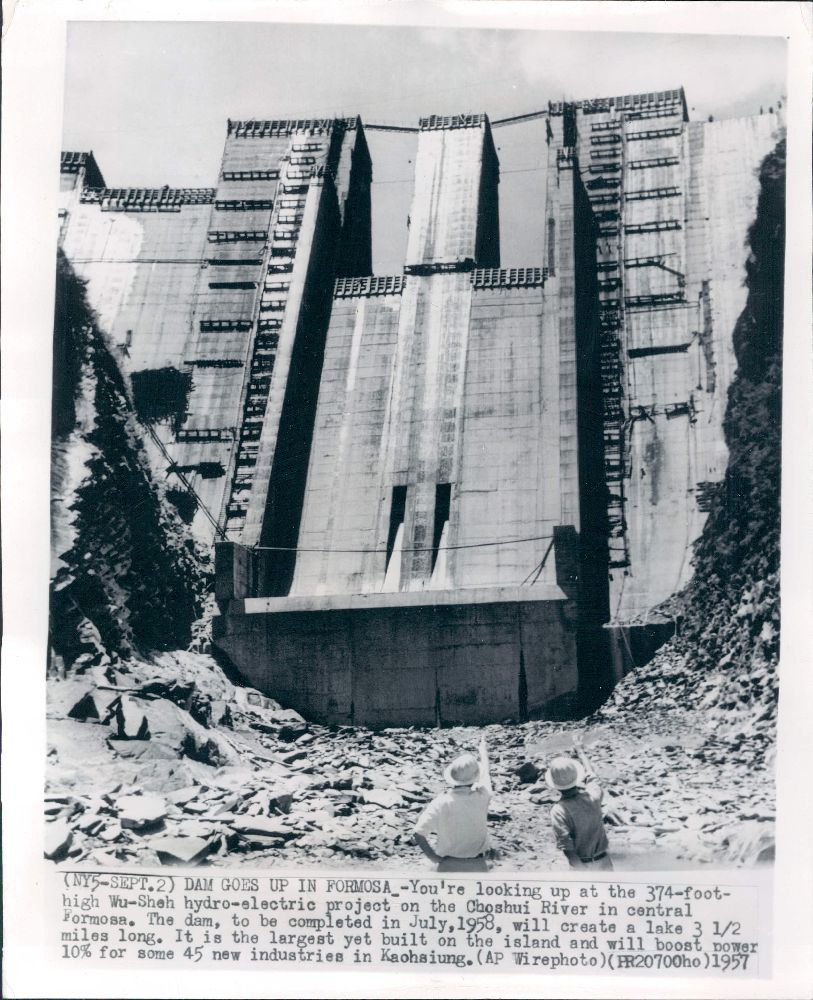
Construction on the main dam in 1956

When Taiwan was under Japanese rule in 1934, hydroelectric plants were constructed at Sun Moon Lake to generate power from the fall of the Zhuoshui River. The Japanese also sought to build power stations upstream on Wushe Creek and Wanda Creek (萬大溪; Wàndà Xī), the two main tributaries that combine to form the Zhuoshui. A reservoir would be required to control the flow of water to the power stations and serve the dual purposes of flood control and trapping sediment. In 1939, construction began on a 97-metre (318 ft) high concrete gravity dam on the Wushe Creek.

After World War II broke out in 1941, industrial resources were increasingly diverted to the war effort and construction was halted in 1944 with only the power plants and 6 percent of the dam complete. After the war, Taiwan Power Company (Taipower) took over the project with aid from the United States Agency for International Development. The U.S. Bureau of Reclamation consulted on a re-design which increased the dam height to 114.6 metres (376 ft). Construction resumed in May 1953. The reservoir first filled in 1957, and the project was officially completed in August 1960, at a cost of NT$376,077,000.

== Specifications ==
=== Construction details ===
The dam is a curved concrete gravity structure with a height of 114.6 metres (376 ft) and length of 205 metres (673 ft). The crest elevation is 1,005.84 metres (3,300.0 ft), and supports a 7 metres (23 ft) roadway. Altogether, the dam contains 349,000 cubic metres (12,300,000 ft^{3}) of concrete. The spillway consists of two radial gates with a capacity of 5,670 cubic metres per second (200,000 cu ft/s). The dam controls runoff from an area of 219 square kilometres (85 mi^{2}), and is operated to reduce flood peaks on the Zhuoshui River by up to 2,520 cubic metres per second (89,000 cu ft/s).

The Wushe Reservoir's normal water level is 1,004.6 metres (3,296 ft), with a flood level of 1,005.0 metres (3,297.2 ft), and covers an area of 2.84 square kilometres (700 acres). Nominal capacity in 1957 was 146,000,000 cubic metres (118,000 acre⋅ft), with a useful capacity of 91,000,000 cubic metres (74,000 acre⋅ft). However, like many reservoirs of Taiwan, it has suffered heavily from siltation, especially after Typhoon Morakot in 2009. The current useful capacity is estimated at no more than 54,390,000 cubic metres (44,090 acre⋅ft).

=== Power station ===
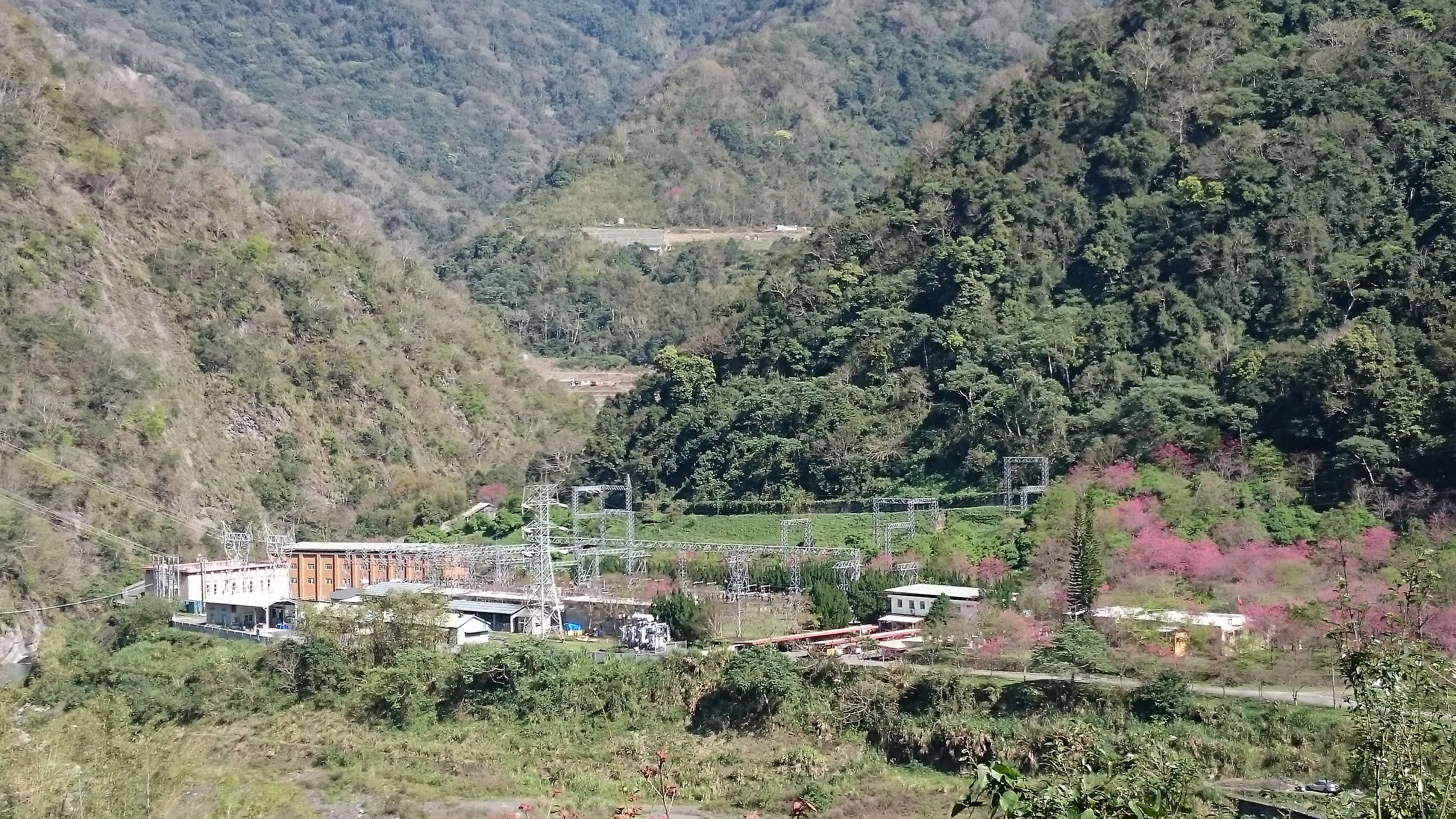
Wanda Power Station

The Wanda Power Station (萬大發電廠; Wàndà Fādiànchǎng) is located about 2 kilometres (1.2 mi) downstream and was the only part of the project to be completed before the construction halted due to World War II. In 1943, it began generating power using water from Wanda Creek, which joins with the Wushe Creek here to form the Zhuoshui River. The three Pelton turbines installed at the time are known as unit G3 and have a capacity of 15,000 kilowatts (KW).

In 1957, generating units G1 and G2 were put into service, using water from the Wushe reservoir at a gross head of 109.7 metres (360 ft). G1 and G2 have a capacity of 20,700 KW each. In 2012 unit G4 was installed, providing an additional capacity of 19,700 KW. All three units are powered by vertical-axis Francis turbines, and generate about 182 million kilowatt hours (KWh) per year.

The Songlin Power Station (松林分廠; Sōnglín Fēnchǎng) is located downstream and generates power from the combined outflow of G1 through G4. It consists of two Francis turbines powering two 20,900 KW generators.

In 2012 Taipower began an overhaul of the power station, installing three new generators and upgrading a fourth. On September 13, 2013, the installation was completed, replacing aged equipment that had been in use since the late 1950s.

== See also ==
- List of dams and reservoirs in Taiwan
- Minghu Dam
- Mingtan Dam
- Sun Moon Lake
- Wujie Dam
- Electricity sector in Taiwan
