= Taichung Xingqi Memorial Hall =

Building in Taichung, Taiwan, 1923–1961

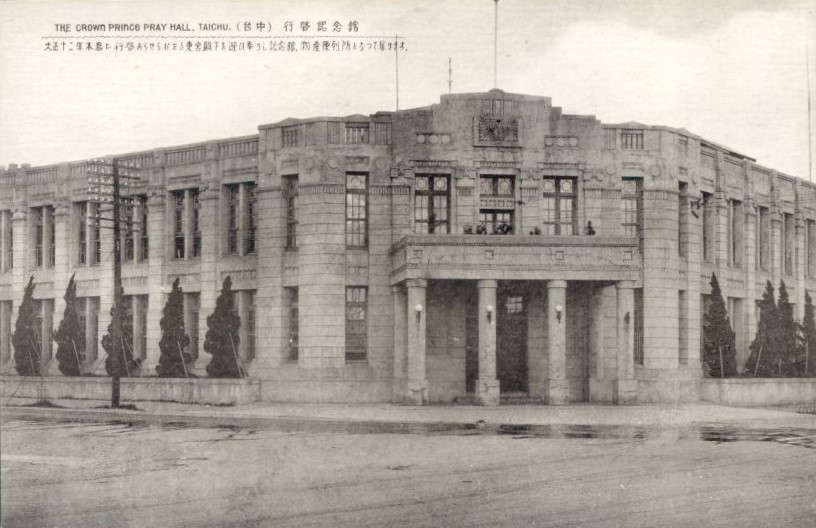
Taichung Xingqi Memorial Hall

The Taichung Xingqi Memorial Hall was built to commemorate the visit of Prince Hirohito to Taiwan in April 1923 (known as the "Taiwan Xingqi"). It was completed in March 1926 and is located at 4-chome-4, Taisho-cho, Taichung City. It also serves as the Taichung State Education Museum and the Taichung State Commerce and Industry Incentive Hall. The building was demolished in the 1960s and later became the Far Eastern Department Store Taichung Store.

== History ==
On April 16, 1923, Crown Prince Hirohito landed at Keelung Port and visited Taiwan. He then traveled south to various places for inspection. On April 19, he took the train from Taipei to Hsinchu and arrived at Taichung Station in the afternoon. He visited Taichung Office, Taichung No. 1 Ordinary Elementary School (now Datong Elementary School), Taichung Sub-Tun Battalion, Taichung Waterway Source, and Taichung No. 1 Middle School. After the crown prince's trip, the Taichung Prefecture government decided to build the "Taichung Xingqi Memorial Hall". The site was chosen to be the army land in Taisho Town. However, due to the problem of base requisition, construction was delayed until April 1925. The building was finally completed in 1926 and the inauguration ceremony was held on March 13 of the same year. The project was funded by 30,600 yen raised by Taichung Prefecture officials and citizens, and 30,000 yen in Taichung Prefecture subsidies, while the Taichung branch of the Taiwan Power Company donated 1,000 yen for the project. To celebrate its completion, the Central Taiwan Progress Association was held from March 28 to April 6.

As for the museum in Taichung, it was originally located in a product exhibition hall near Taichung Station. When the Taichung Railway was fully opened in 1908, it was moved to a new building in Taichung Park. Later, in December 1924, Taichung Prefecture promulgated the "Taichung Prefecture Education Museum Rules" and began to plan the establishment of the museum and exhibits, and planned to use the Taichung Xingqi Memorial Hall as the museum site. On June 17, 1926, the Taichung Prefecture Education Museum (second floor) and the Taichung Prefecture Product Exhibition Hall (first floor) opened simultaneously in the Taichung Xingqi Memorial Hall. The exhibits of the Taichung Prefecture Education Museum are mainly machinery, specimens and other items related to physics, chemistry and museology, with the popularization of science as its feature, for the public to visit or loan to schools for teaching. On August 21, 1926, Taichung First Middle School, Taichung Second Middle School, Taichung First Girls' High School and Taichung Second Girls' High School handed over their specimens and physical and chemical experimental equipment to the Taichung State Education Museum for safekeeping and display. On March 31, 1933, a "mobile observatory" was set up on the roof of the Taichung Xingqi Memorial Hall, which was regularly open to the public for stargazing using telescopes. average number of visitors per day in 1937 was 434. The museum is free to visit and is closed on the first and third Mondays of each month and from the end of the year to the end of the year (December 28 to January 3). The opening hours are from 8:00 to 16:00 from April to October and from 9:00 to 16:00 from November to March.

On March 3 and 4, 1934, the Taichung State Education Museum held static and dynamic exhibitions at Fengyuan Public School, as well as a darkroom display of electrical experiments. It was originally planned to display a telescope, but this was abandoned due to bad weather. In addition, in conjunction with the Taiwan Exposition, local venues were set up in various places. The Taichung Xingqi Memorial Hall was used as the "Taichung Mountain Hall" during the exhibition. The first floor displayed and sold mountain-related industries and products, including silkworm breeding, black tea cultivation, mushroom cultivation, rattan products, bamboo products, lacquer extraction, charcoal production, etc. The second floor displayed photos and three-dimensional models related to sightseeing and mountaineering. The rooftop had a zoo, orchard, mountain restaurant and observation deck. In 1938, in order to promote tourism in Taichung Prefecture's second-highest Taroko National Park, such as Wushe and the nearby Sakura Hot Spring, a "National Park Taichung Association Tourism Information Center" was set up on the second floor of the Taichung Xingqi Memorial Hall to introduce related tourism activities. On December 18, 1938, the Taichung Products Exhibition Hall was renamed the "Taichung Prefecture Commercial and Industrial Encouragement Hall".

After World War II, the Taichung Xingqi Memorial Hall became the headquarters of the Taichung Military Police. In 1961, the original building was demolished and rebuilt into a "comprehensive building", which was the earliest comprehensive commercial building in Taichung City and later became the Far Eastern Department Store Taichung Branch.

== See also ==
- Commodity Exhibition Hall
