= Zhongliao =

Rural township in Nantou County, Taiwan

Coordinates: 23°54′14″N 120°46′55″E

Zhongliao Township 中寮鄉
- Rural township
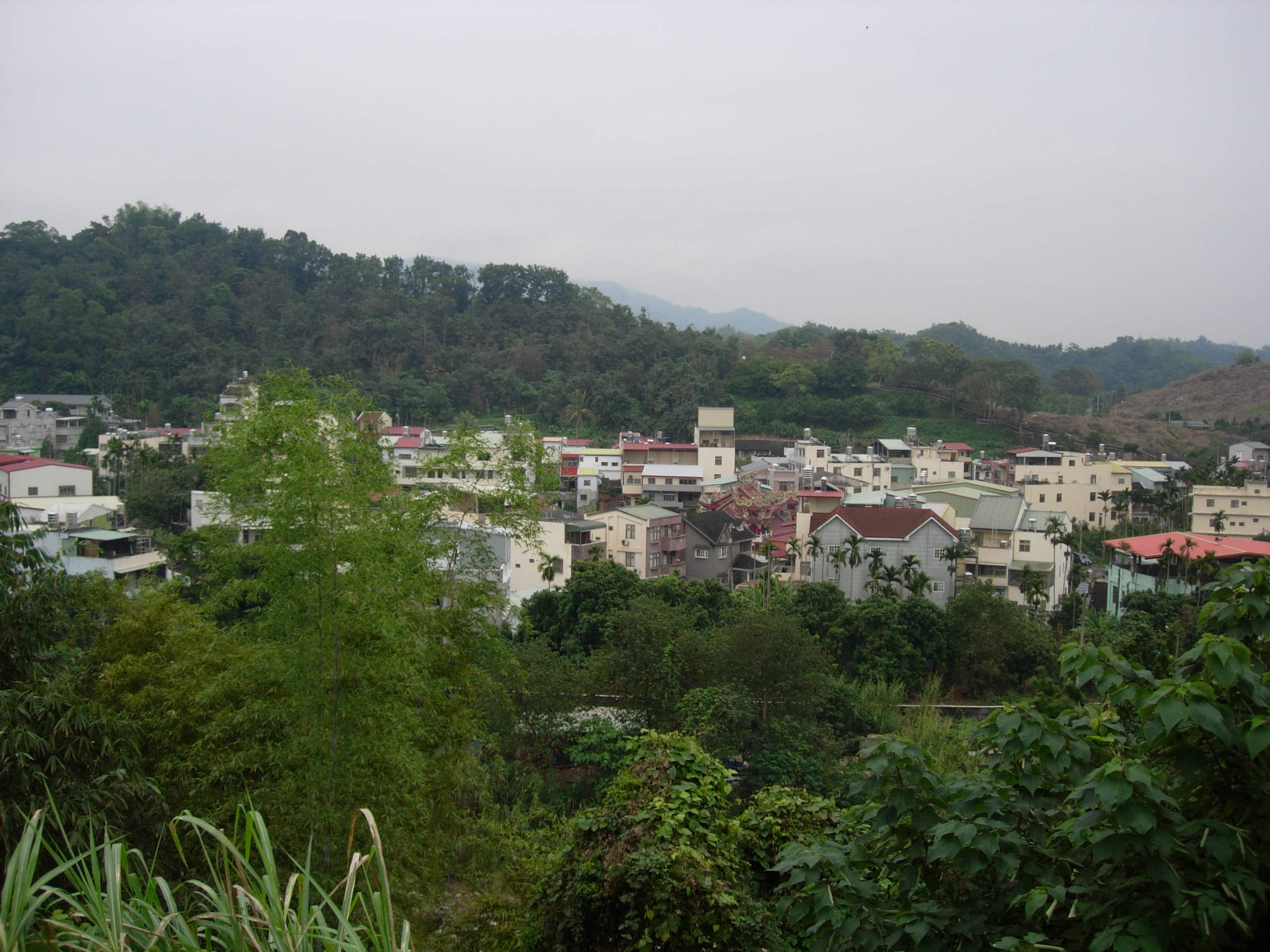

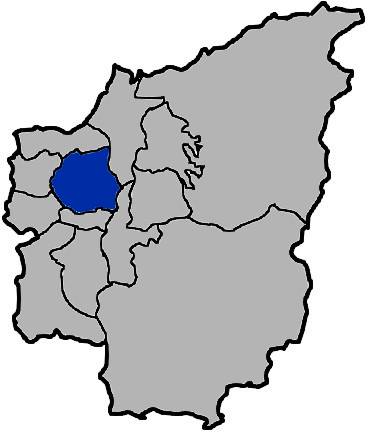
- Zhongliao Township in Nantou County
- Location: Nantou County, Taiwan

Area
  - Total: 147 km^{2} (57 sq mi)

Population (February 2023)
  - Total: 13,774
  - Density: 93.7/km^{2} (243/sq mi)

Zhongliao Township
- Traditional Chinese: 中寮鄉
- Hanyu Pinyin: Zhōngliáo Xiāng
- Wade–Giles: Chung^{1}-liao^{2} Hsiang^{1}
- Tongyong Pinyin: Jhongliáo Siang
- Romanization: Chûng-liàu-hiông
- Hokkien POJ: Tiong-liâu-hiong

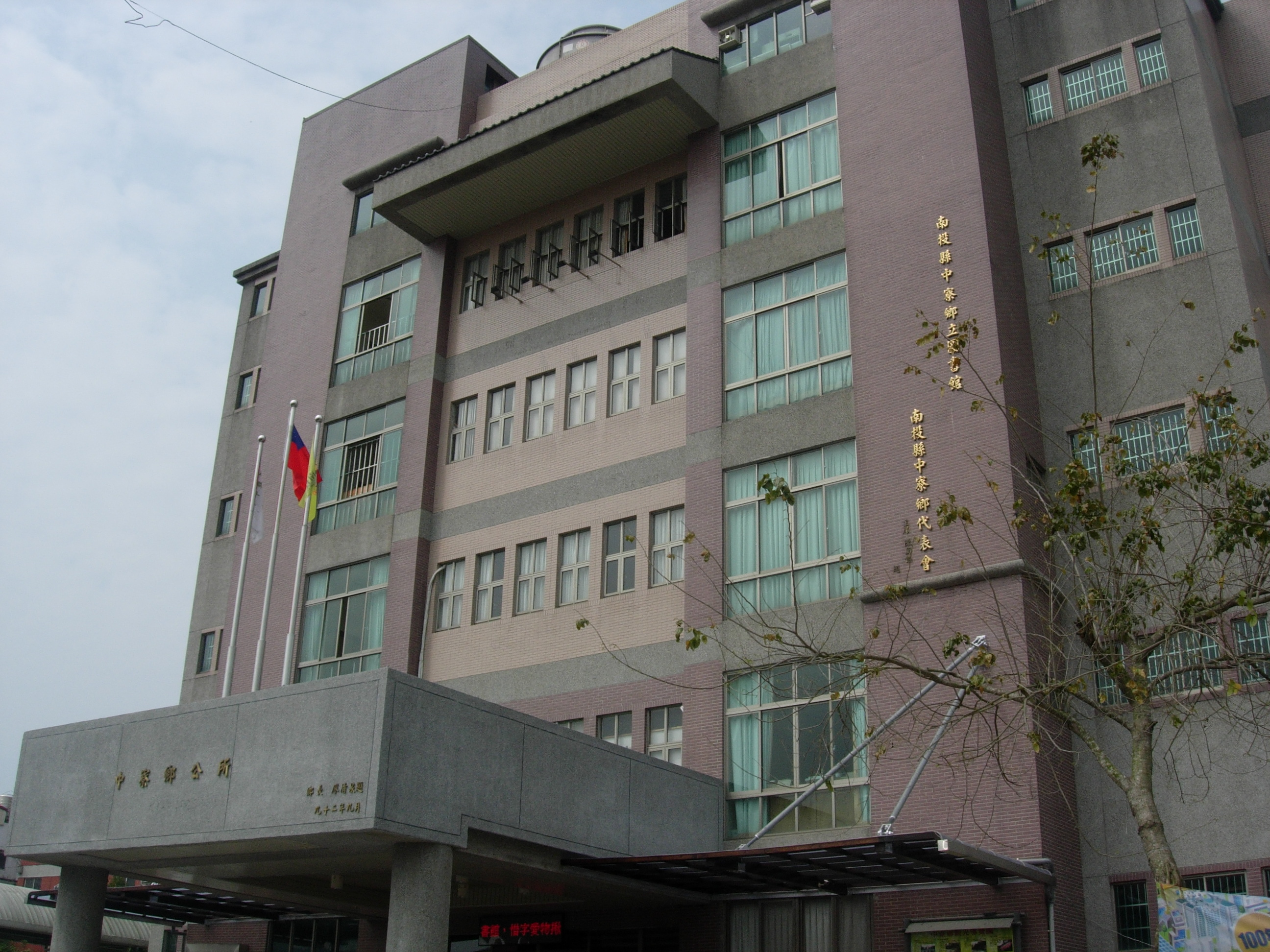
Zhongliao Township office

Zhongliao Township is a rural township in Nantou County, Taiwan.

== Geography ==
It has a population total of 13,774 and an area of 146.65 square kilometres (56.62 sq mi).

== Administrative divisions ==
The township comprises 18 villages: Baxian, Fucheng, Fuxing, Guangfu, Guangxing, Hexing, Kanding, Longan, Longyan, Neicheng, Qingshui, Shuangwen, Yihe, Yongfang, Yongfu, Yonghe, Yongping and Zhongliao.

== Tourist attractions ==
- Cingcheng Farm
- Cukeng Big Cliff
- Hesing Organic Cultural Village
- Longfeng Waterfall
- Longyanlin Leisure Agriculture Area
- Scenic Erjian Mountain
- Shilong Temple
- Sianfeng Sun Moon Cave
- Yongping Old Street
- Yuetaosiang Comprehensive Farm
- Zhangyuan Tunnel
