= Shilong Temple =

Temple in Nantou County, Taiwan

- 石龍宮
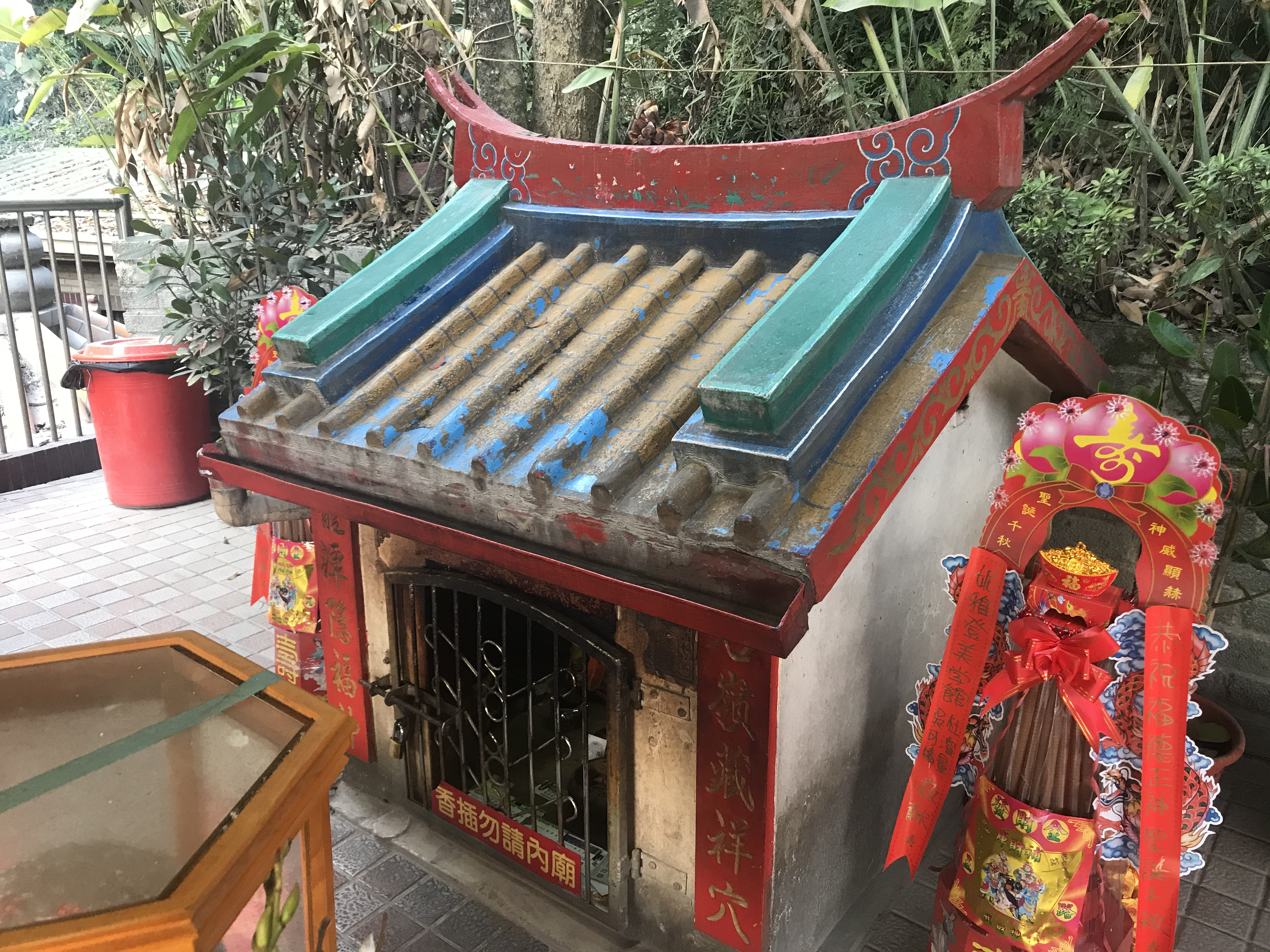

- Location within Taiwan

Religion
- Affiliation: Taoism
- Deity: Tudigong

Location
- Location: Zhongliao, Nantou County
- Country: Taiwan
- Interactive map of Shilong Temple
- Coordinates: 23°55′25″N 120°44′19″E

Architecture
- Height (max): 1.5 m (4 ft 11 in)

Shilong Temple (Chinese: 石龍宮; pinyin: Shílóng Gōng) is a temple in Yonghe Village, Zhongliao Township, Nantou County, Taiwan. Dedicated to the tutelary deity Tudigong, the small temple is known for its worship with instant noodles.

== History ==
According to legend, Shilong Temple was established over one hundred years ago. Initially, the temple had no building nor statue but was merely four rocks. At some point, a traveler from Tangshan left a glowing incense bag on a tree, which was perceived as divine and was worshipped by locals. In the 1950s, a worshipper decided to craft a statue for the temple. That night, a spirit appeared in his dreams and instructed him to put a black beard on the statue, instead of the usual white color.

In the 1980s, the temple was popular among gamblers playing dajiale (a type of illegal lottery) seeking for good luck.

== Architecture and etymology ==
Shilong Temple is located on the south bank of the Zhangping River (樟平溪), a tributary of the Maoluo River. The temple itself is small, standing at a mere 1.5 m (4 ft 11 in) tall. Despite this, there is a large courtyard for worshipers to eat, as well as a parking lot with a capacity of nearly one hundred cars. The temple's name, which translates to "rock dragon temple", is derived from the rock Tudigong statue inside and how the hills behind the temple look like a dragon's back.

== Worship ==
Shilong Temple is unique in that pilgrims mostly present instant noodles to Tudigong instead of the usual range of foods found in other temples. Instant noodles are also given to worshippers free of charge and are usually eaten on the temple's premises. According to the temple, the tradition owes to the temple's remote location, leading to hungry worshippers eating the noodles left behind by past pilgrims. Eating noodles at the temple was discouraged during the COVID-19 pandemic over concerns of spreading the virus.

== Gallery ==
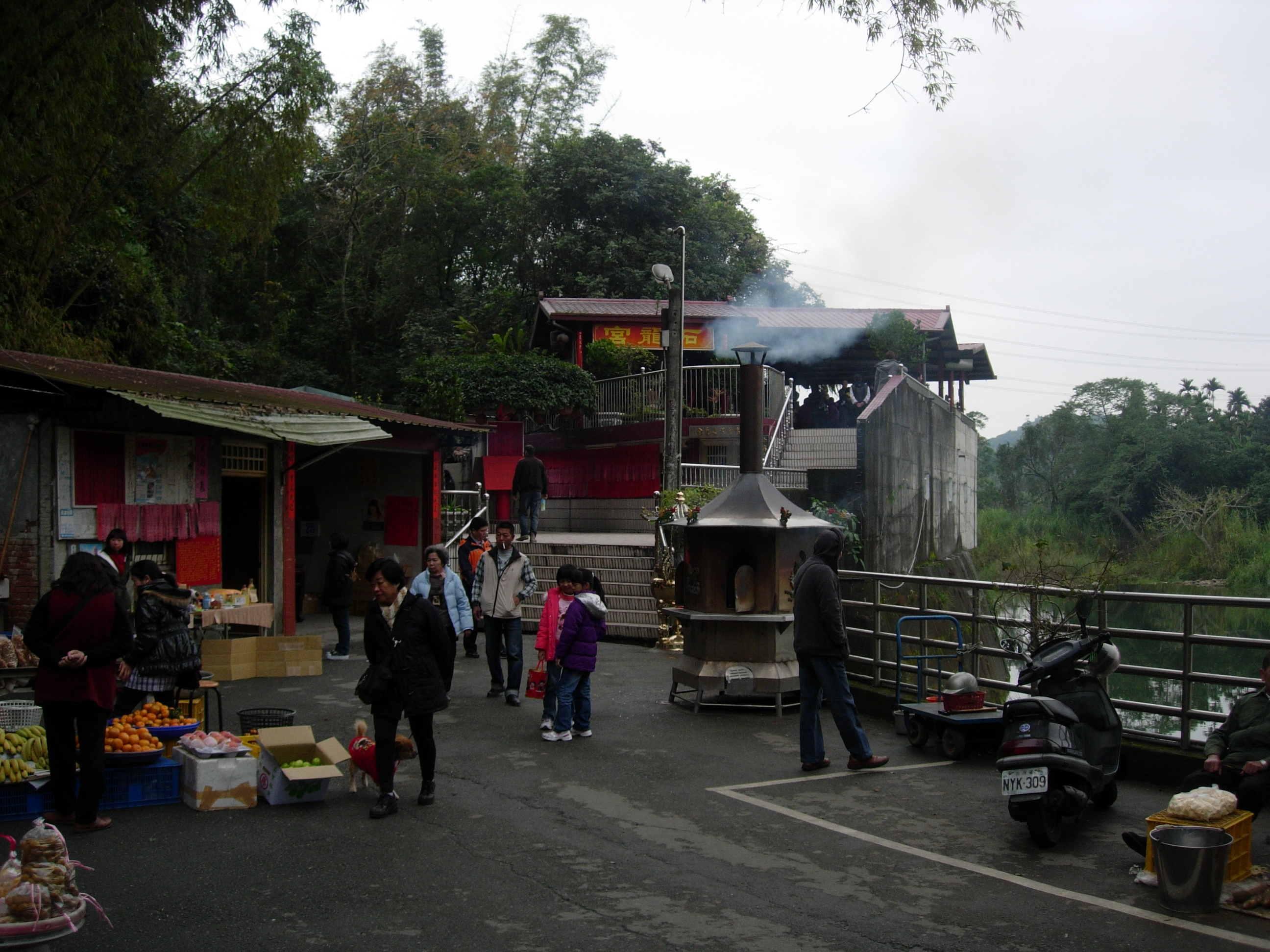
Entrance to the temple

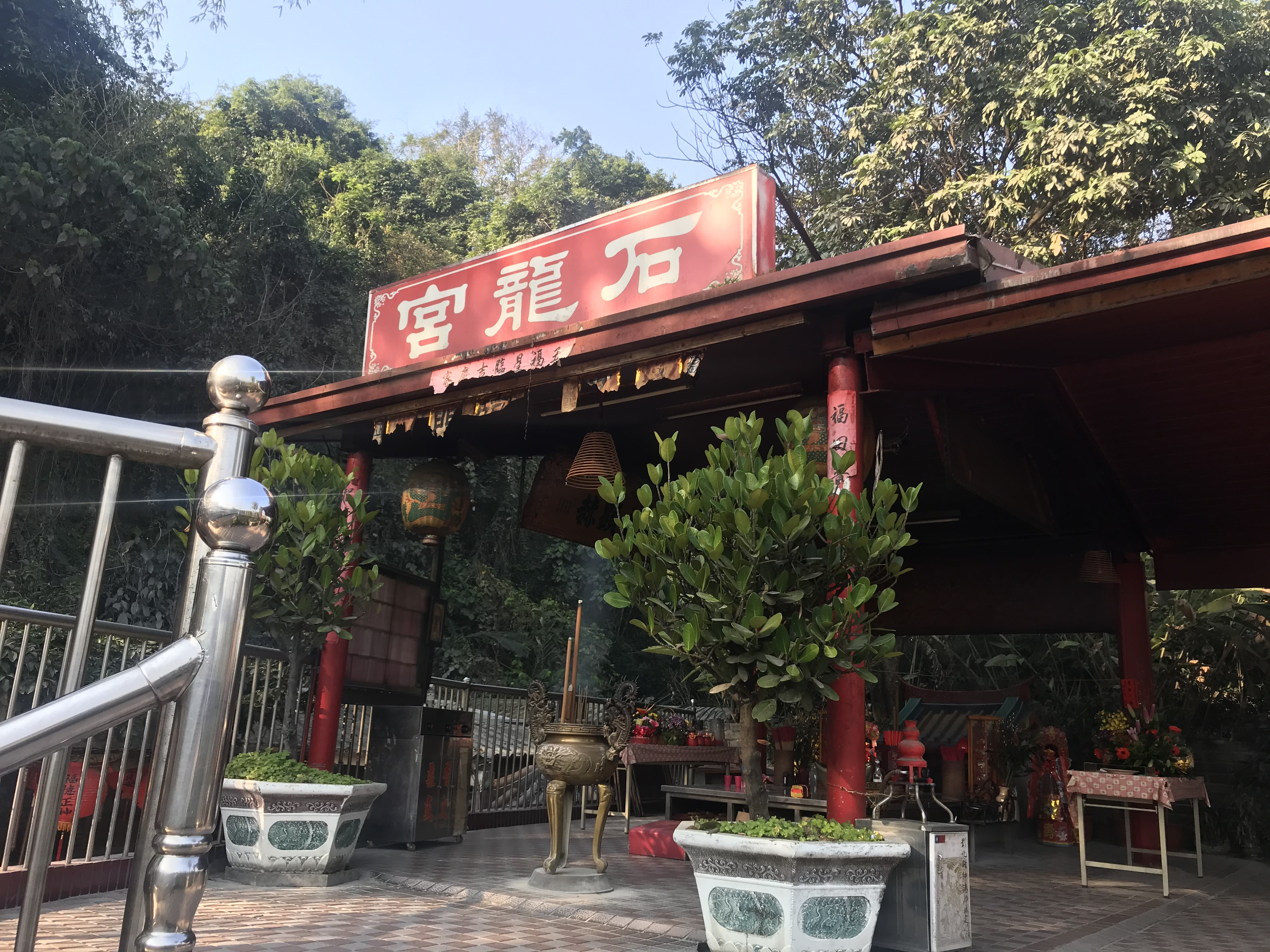
The temple's canopy, which covers the temple and its altar.

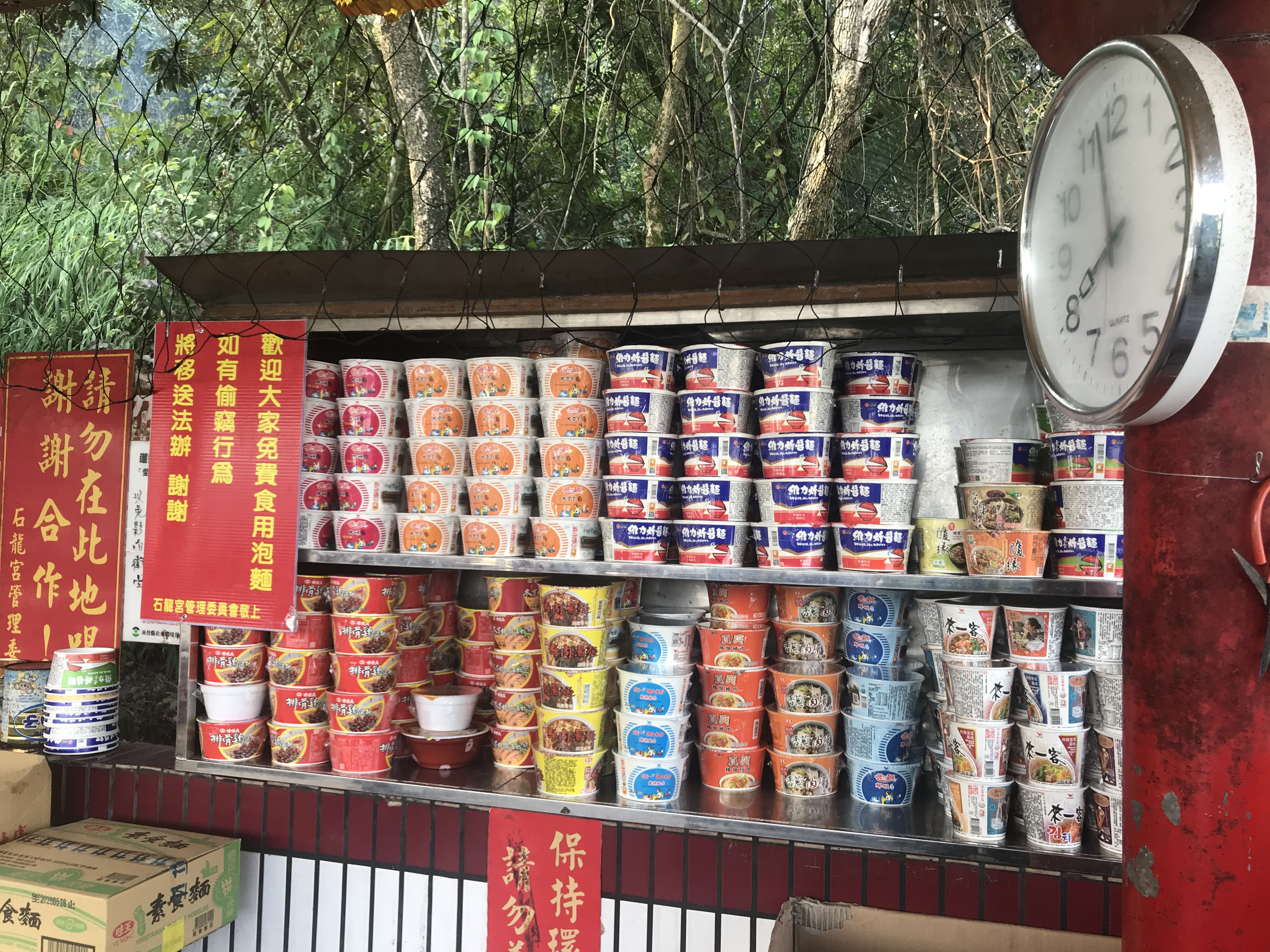
Cabinet of instant noodles for pilgrims to eat

== See also ==
- Sheji (社稷)
- Checheng Fu'an Temple, Pingtung County
- Zhushan Zinan Temple, Zhushan Township
- List of temples in Taiwan
