= Shanlinxi Forest Recreation Area =

Forest in Zhushan, Nantou County, Taiwan

Shanlinxi Forest Recreation Area Chinese: 杉林溪森林生態渡假園區
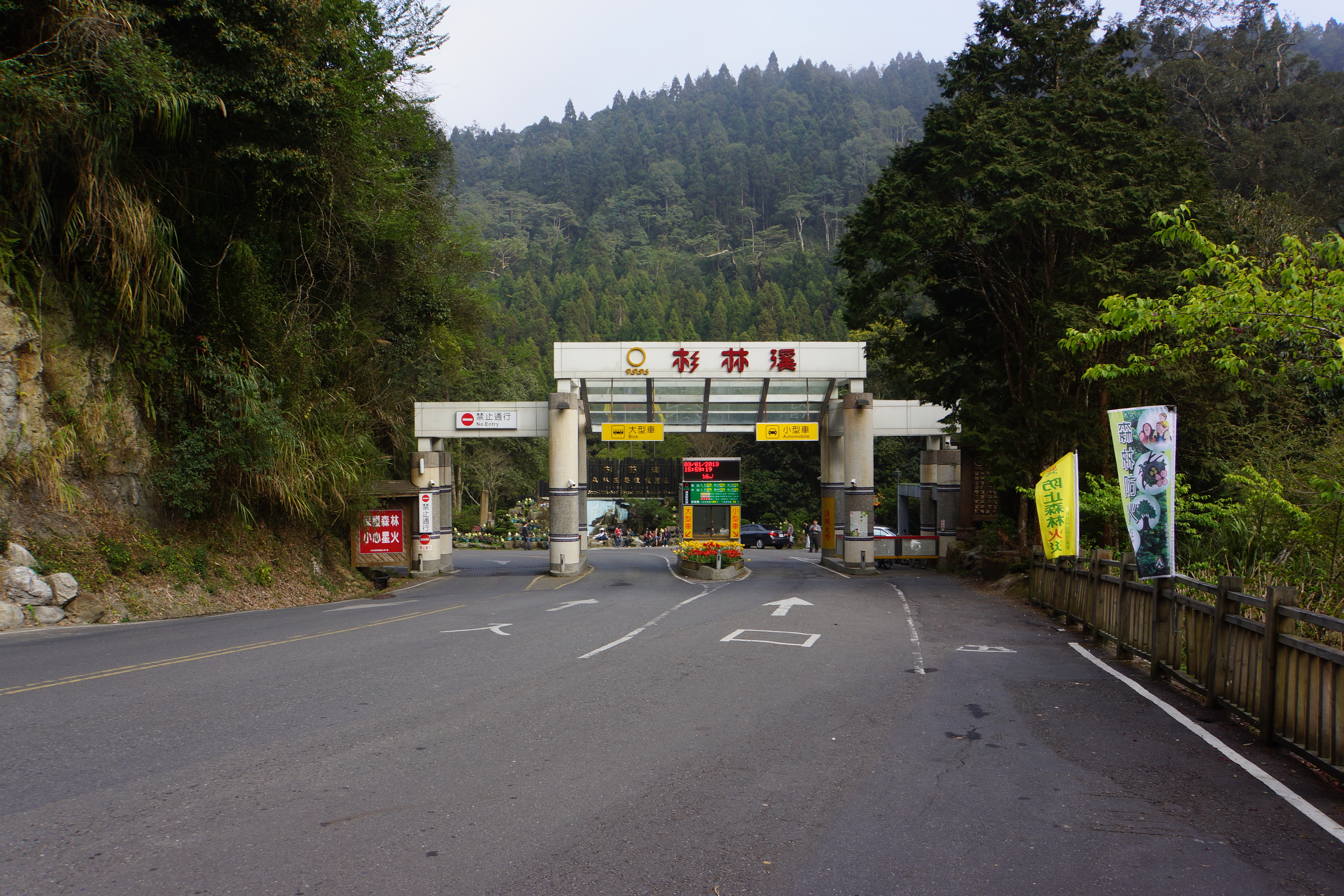

- Location within Nantou County
- Interactive map of Shanlinxi Forest Recreation Area

Geography
- Location: Zhushan, Nantou County, Taiwan
- Coordinates: 23°38′12.0″N 120°47′47.1″E
- Elevation: 1,600–1,800 m (5,200–5,900 ft)
- Area: 40 ha (99 acres)

Shanlinxi Forest Recreation Area or Sun Link Sea Forest Recreation Area (traditional Chinese: 杉林溪森林生態渡假園區; simplified Chinese: 杉林溪森林生态渡假园区; pinyin: Shānlínxī Sēnlín Shēngtài Dùjiǎ Yuánqū) is a forest in Zhushan Township, Nantou County, Taiwan.

== Geography ==
The forest is located at an elevation of 1,600-1,800 meters above sea level with an area of 40 hectares. It consists of herb and flower garden as well as three waterfalls, namely Qingyun Waterfall, Niaosong Waterfall and Water Curtain Cave Waterfall.

== Facilities ==
The forest features campsites and wooden cottages.

== Transportation ==
The forest is accessible by bus from Taichung Station of Taiwan Railway.

== See also ==
- Geography of Taiwan
