= Zhushan Zinan Temple =

Temple in Zhushan, Nantou County, Taiwan

- 竹山紫南宮
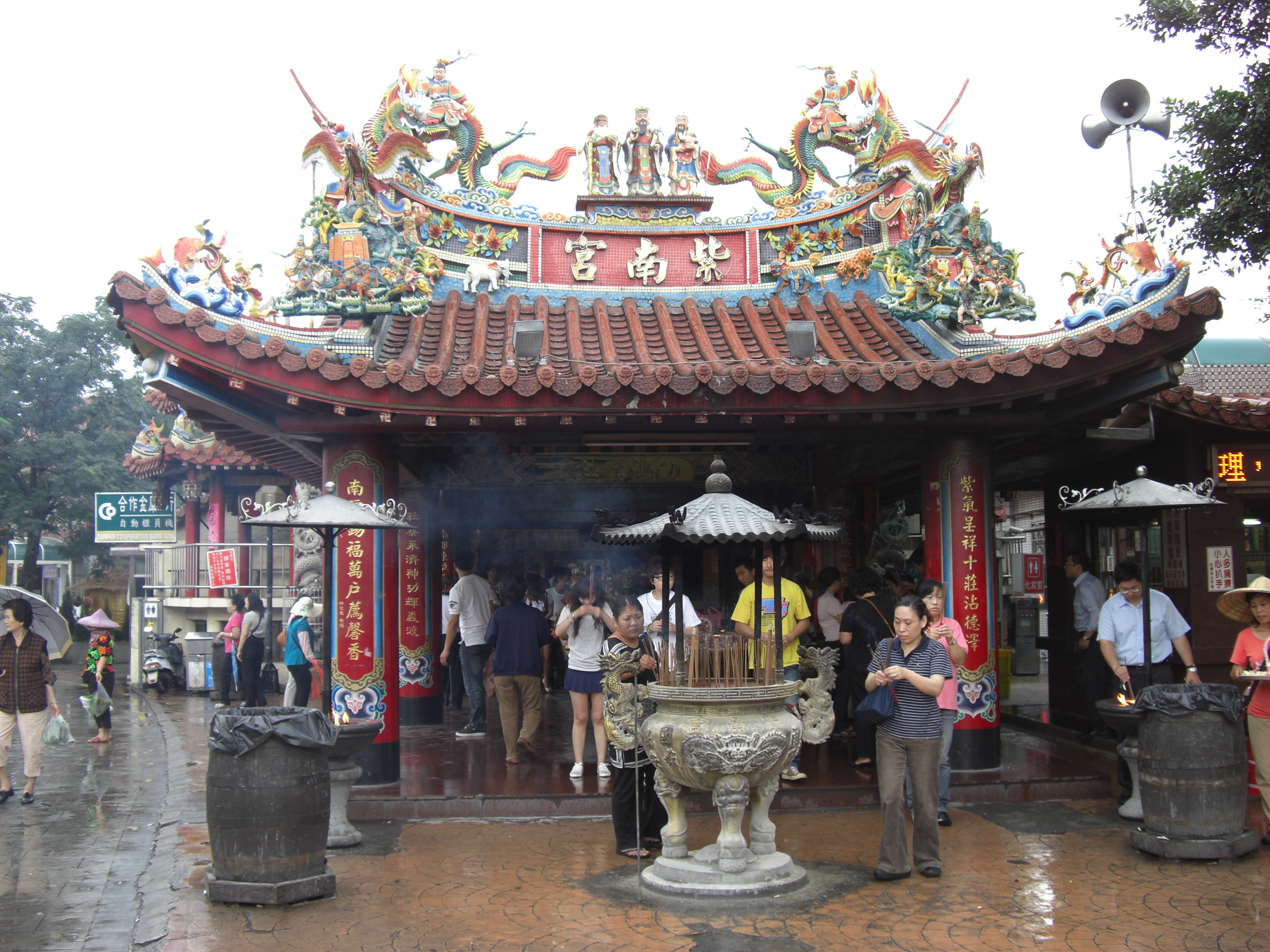

- Location within Nantou County

Location
- Location: Zhushan, Nantou County, Taiwan
- Interactive map of Zhushan Zinan Temple
- Coordinates: 23°49′01.8″N 120°43′21.1″E

Architecture
- Type: Chinese temple
- Completed: 1745

Website
- Official website

The Zhushan Zinan Temple (Chinese: 竹山紫南宮; pinyin: Zhúshān Zǐnán Gōng) is a Chinese Temple dedicated to Fude Zhengshen (福德正神) and located in Sheliao Village, Zhushan Township, Nantou County, Taiwan.

== Popular Activities ==
1. Borrow money from the Fude Zhengshen (福德正神), the God of Prosperity

It is believed that borrowing money from the Fude Zhengshen (福德正神), the God of Prosperity will bring good luck, good fortune, and prosperity. This is why many so people come to Zi Nan Temple to borrow money each year. This tradition has become one of the most famous activities for worshippers and tourists that come to Zi Nan Temple. See this page for a guide on how to Borrow Money from the Land God.

2. Pat the Golden Hen

Pat the Golden Hen for good luck and good fortune.

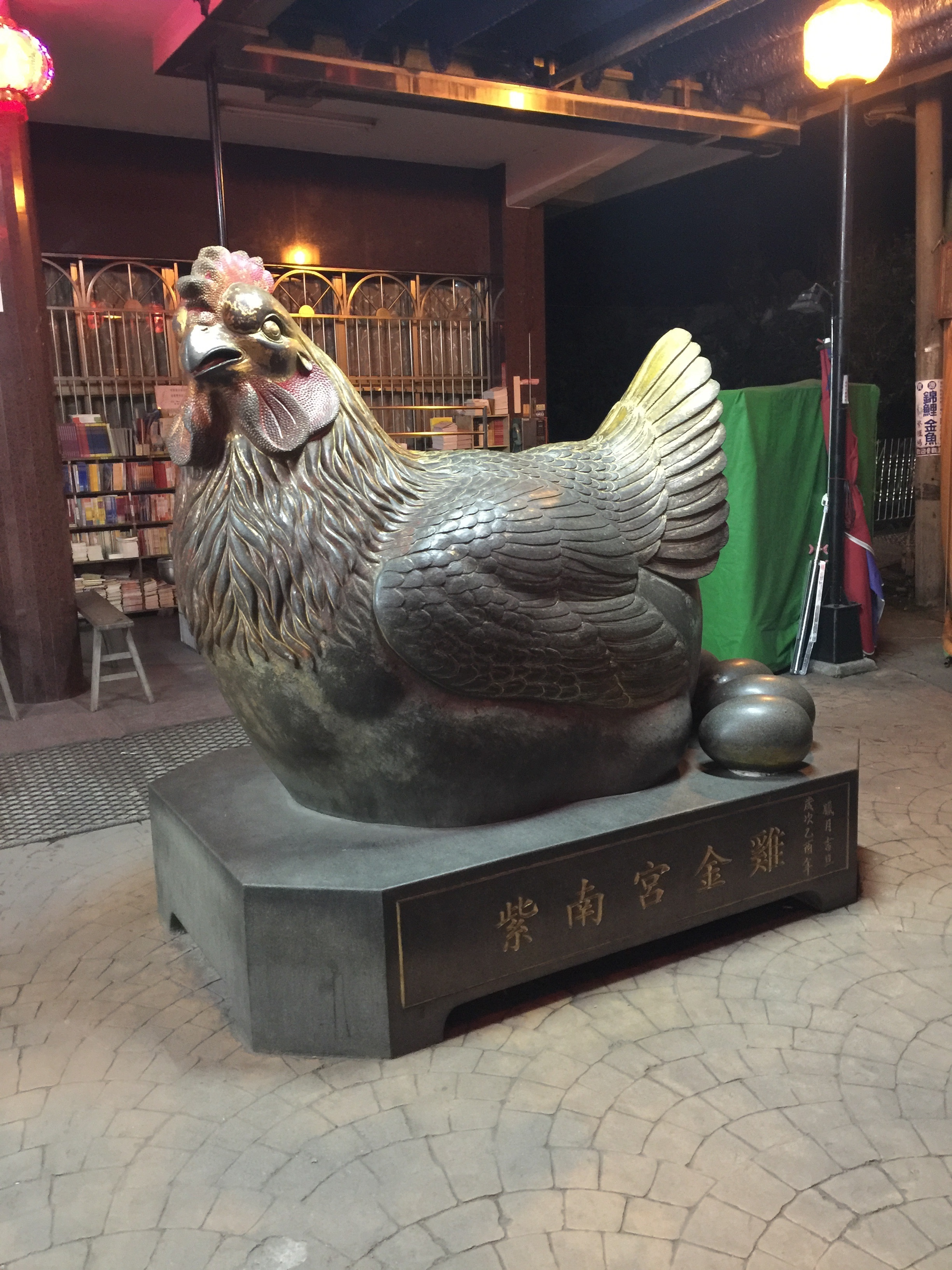
Pat the Golden Hen

== History ==
The temple was established in 1745. On 23 September 2017, the temple deployed a Pepper robot to help modernize the temple's image and act as a temple guide.

== Transportation ==
The temple is accessible by bus from Taichung Station of Taiwan High Speed Rail.

== See also ==
- Sheji (社稷)
- Checheng Fu'an Temple, Pingtung County
- Shilong Temple, Zhongliao Township
- List of temples in Taiwan
- List of tourist attractions in Taiwan
