= Shuili River =

River in Nantou County, Taiwan

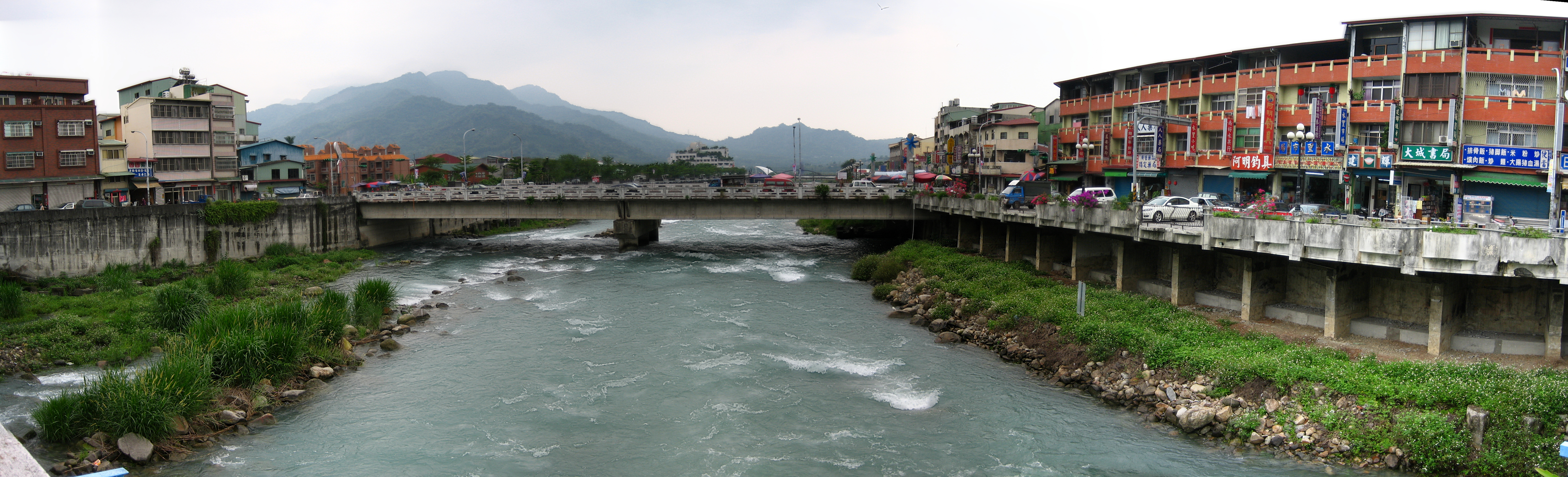
- The Shuili River passing through Shueili Township
- Native name: 水里溪 (Chinese)

Location
- Location: Nantou County, Taiwan

Physical characteristics
- Mouth: Zhuoshui River
  - coordinates: 23.8127°N 120.8473°E
- Length: 19 km (12 mi)

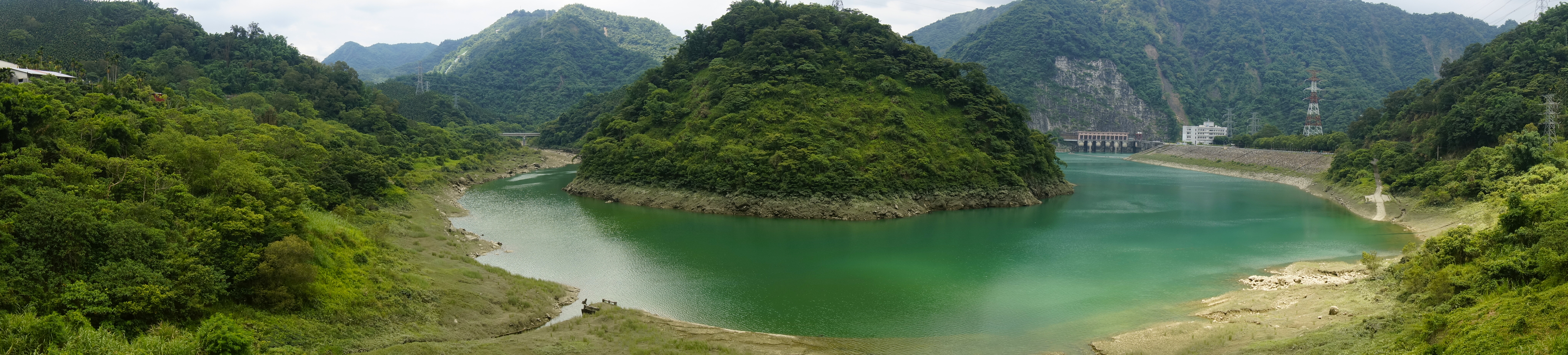
Reservoir formed from Shuili River by the Mingtan Dam.

The Shuili or Shueili River (Chinese: 水里溪; Hanyu Pinyin: Shuǐlǐ Xī; Tongyong Pinyin: Shuěilǐ Si) is a river in Nantou County, Taiwan.

== Geology ==
It flows through Nantou County for 19 km and is the tributary for Zhuoshui River.

== Power generation ==
The river passes through the Minghu Dam and Mingtan Dam in Shuili Township to generate electricity during off peak period with a capacity of 1,008 MW and 1,602 MW respectively.

== See also ==
- Sun Moon Lake
- Mingtan Dam
- Minghu Dam
- List of rivers in Taiwan
