= Kashe River =

River in Nantou County, Taiwan

- Map showing the mouth of Kashe River at its confluence with the Zhuoshui River

Location
- Country: Taiwan

Physical characteristics
- Mouth
  - location: 阿桑托洛 at the Xinyi–Ren'ai Township border
  - coordinates: 23.815833°N 121.0375°E
- Length: 46.79 km (29.07 mi)
- Basin size: 145.51 km^{2} (56.18 sq mi)

Basin features
- River system: Zhuoshui River

The Kashe River (Chinese: 卡社溪; pinyin: Kǎshè Xī) is a 47 km (29 mi) long river in Nantou County, central Taiwan. It is a tributary of the Zhuoshui River.

== See also ==
- List of rivers in Taiwan
