= Zhangyuan Tunnel =

Tunnel in Zhongliao, Nantou County, Taiwan

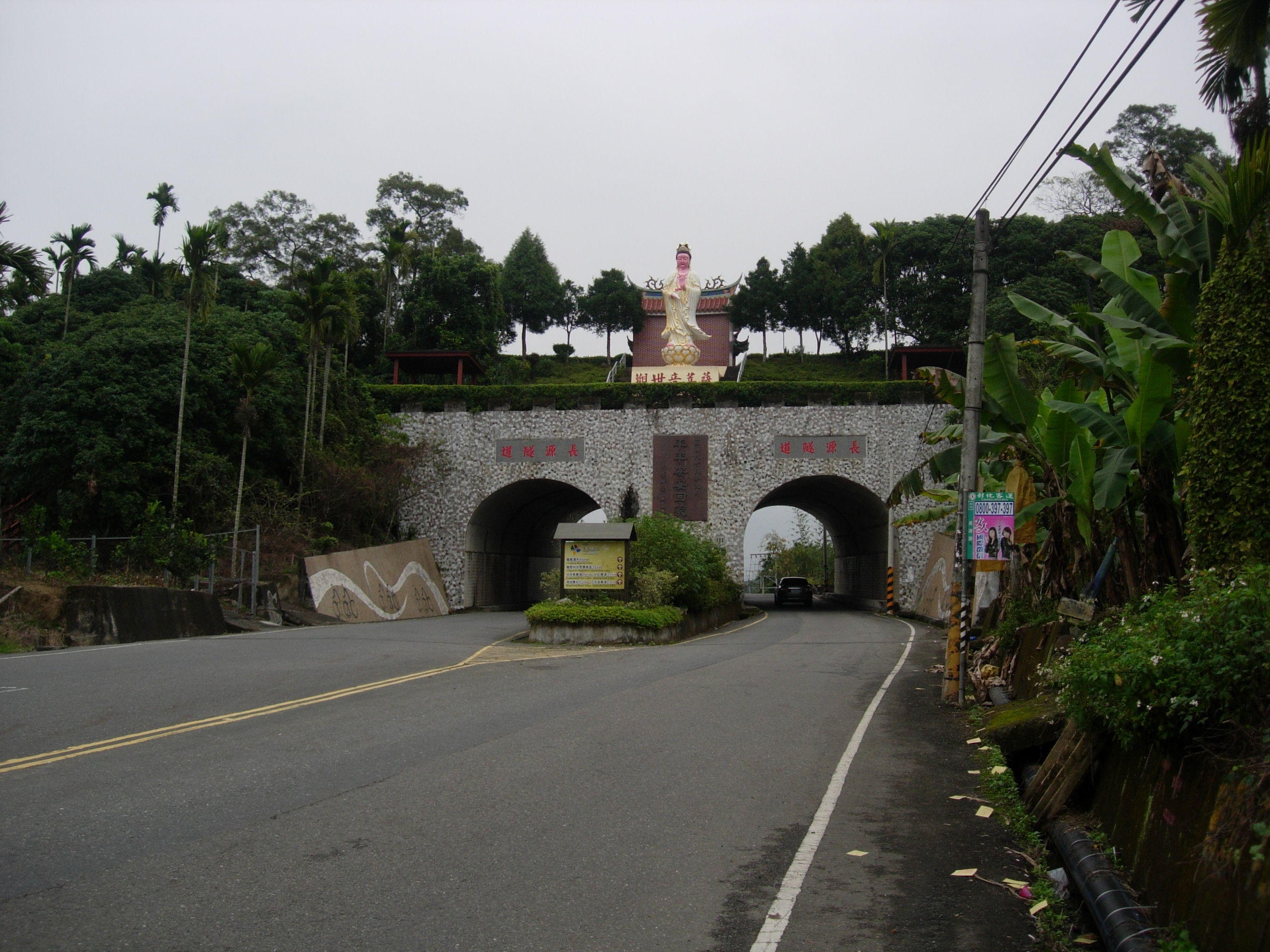
- Interactive map of Zhangyuan Tunnel

Overview
- Official name: 長源隧道
- Location: Zhongliao, Nantou County, Taiwan
- Coordinates: 23°55′51.9″N 120°44′44.5″E

The Zhangyuan Tunnel (traditional Chinese: 長源隧道; simplified Chinese: 长源隧道; pinyin: Zhǎngyuán Suìdào) is a tunnel in Yonghe Village, Zhongliao, Nantou County, Taiwan.

== History ==
The single-cave tunnel was constructed during the Japanese rule of Taiwan where the government organized civil labors to dig the tunnel. In 1991, another cave was cut due to the road widening project.

== See also ==
- Transportation in Taiwan
