= Xiluo Bridge =

Bridge in Taiwan

Xiluo Bridge 西螺大橋
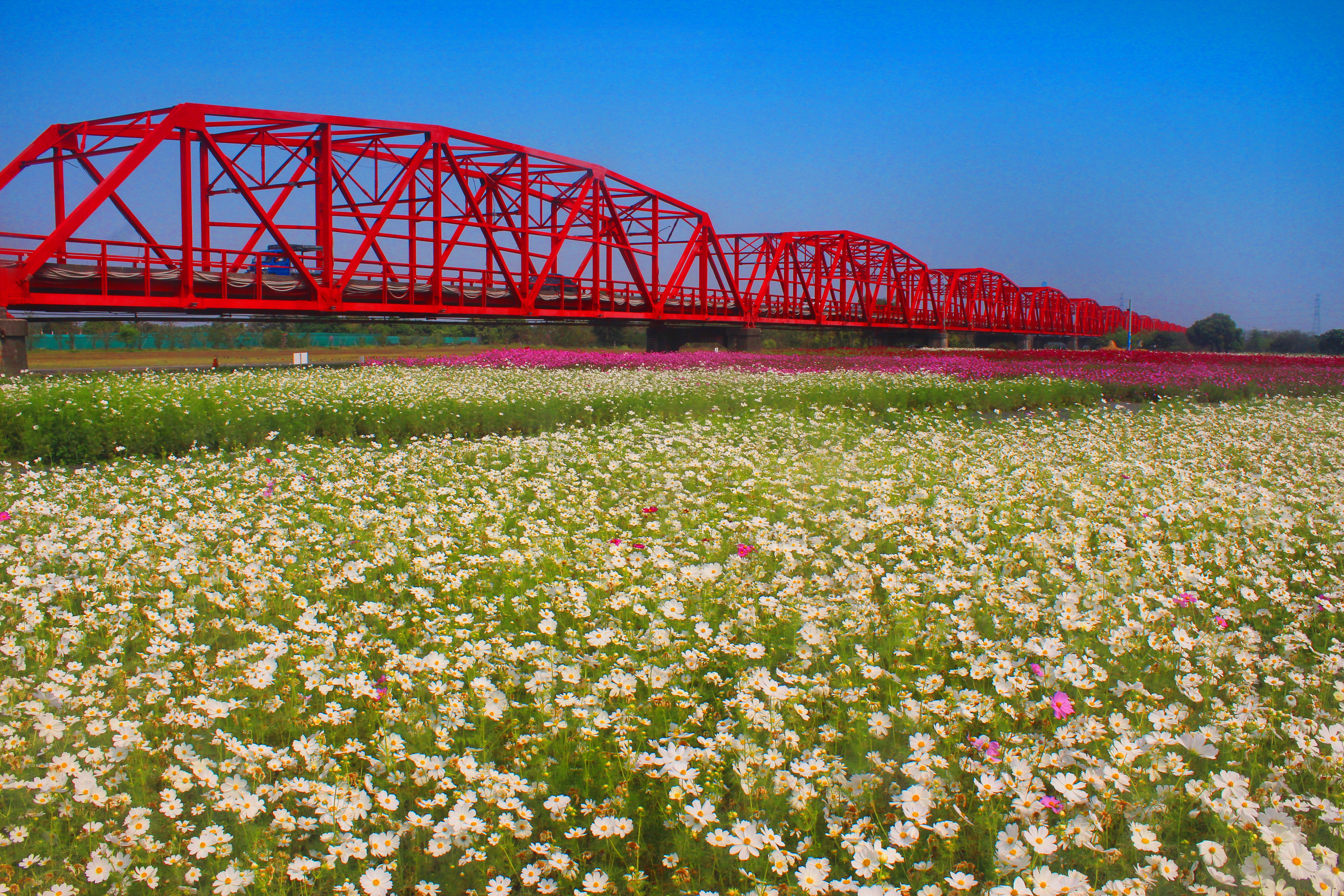
- Coordinates: 23°48′46.3″N 120°27′39.3″E
- Locale: Xiluo, Yunlin County and Xizhou, Changhua County in Taiwan

Characteristics
- Design: bridge
- Total length: 1,939.03 meters

History
- Construction start: October 1937
- Construction end: 25 December 1952
- Inaugurated: 24 January 1953

Location
- Interactive map of Xiluo Bridge

The Xiluo Bridge (traditional Chinese: 西螺大橋; simplified Chinese: 西螺大桥; pinyin: Xīluó Dàqiáo) is a bridge in Taiwan, connecting Xiluo in Yunlin County and Xizhou in Changhua County crossing over Zhuoshui River.

== History ==
=== Empire of Japan ===
On 24 March 1936, the local people of the area set up a committee to construct a bridge over the Zhuoshui River. They pledged construction effort to the Japanese government and work began in October 1937. As of March 1940, 32 piers had been completed. However, construction was suspended after the outbreak of war against the United States on 7 December 1941. The Japanese government then moved the materials for the bridge to Hainan, Republic of China.

=== Republic of China ===
After the handover of Taiwan from Japan to the Republic of China in 1945, the Xiluo Bridge Reconstruction Committee was established in 1948. On 26 January 1950, personnel from Taiwan Provincial Government, legislators, engineers of Economic Cooperation Administration, Council for United States (US) Aids conducted a site survey. In 1951, the US Government spent US$1.3 million for the steel material and the Taiwan Provincial Government also provided NT$6 million for the project. The Taiwan Machinery Manufacturing Corporation and the Mechanical Engineering Department of the Ministry of Economic Affairs were in charge of the bridge erection and painting projects respectively. The construction of the bridge resumed on 28 May 1952 and completed on 25 December the same year. The inauguration ceremony of the bridge was held on 24 January 1953.

== Technical detail ==
The bridge spans over a length of 1,939.03 meters with 31 arches.

== Transportation ==
The bridge is accessible by bus from Douliu Station of Taiwan Railway.

== See also ==
- List of bridges in Taiwan
- Transportation in Taiwan
