= Zhushan, Nantou =

Urban township in Nantou County, Taiwan

Coordinates: 23°41′20″N 120°43′44″E

Zhushan Township 竹山鎮
- Urban township
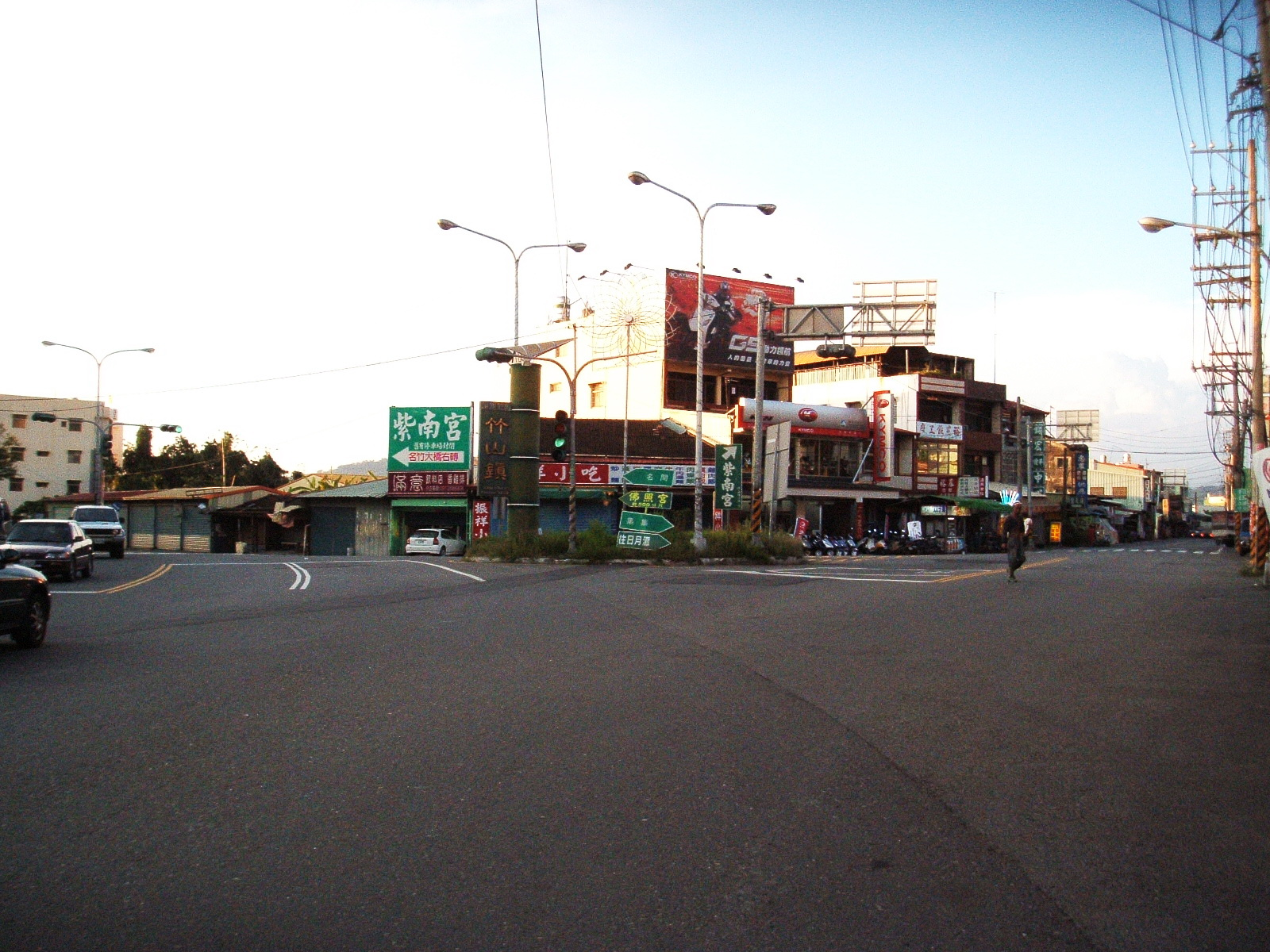

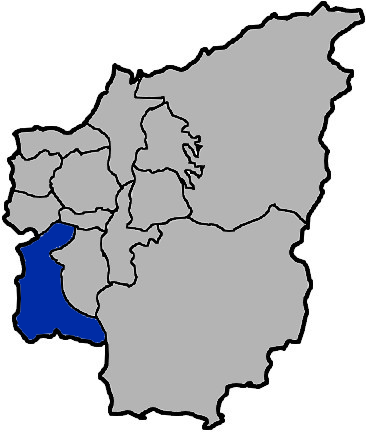
- Zhushan Township in Nantou County
- Location: Nantou County, Taiwan

Area
  - Total: 247 km^{2} (95 sq mi)

Population (February 2023)
  - Total: 51,800
  - Density: 210/km^{2} (543/sq mi)

Zhushan Township (Chinese: 竹山鎮; Hanyu Pinyin: Zhúshān Zhèn; Tongyong Pinyin: Jhúshan Jhèn; Pe̍h-ōe-jī: Tek-san; lit. 'Bamboo Mountain') is an urban township in the southwest part of Nantou County, Taiwan, and off the south shore of Zhuoshui River.

== Geography ==
Population: 51,800 people

== Administrative divisions ==
Zhushan, Zhongzheng, Zhongshan, Yunlin, Zhuwei, Guilin, Xiaping, Zhonghe, Zhongqi, Xiulin, Daan, Yanhe, Yanxiang, Yanzheng, Yanping, Yanshan, Shanchong, Sheliao, Zhongyang, Fuzhou, Tianzi, Huiyao, Dexing, Fuxing, Liyu, Pingding, Ruizhu and Tongtou Village.

== Government agencies ==
- Central Backup Center of Central Emergency Operation Center

== Education ==
- National Zhushan Senior High School

== Tourist attractions ==
- Chelungpu Fault Preservation Park
- Jiji Weir
- Shanlinxi Forest Recreation Area
- Zhushan Zinan Temple
- Beishi Xigu (north force creek valley)
- Shadonggong National Earthquake Park
- Stair Suspension Bridge
- Sun Link Sea Forest Recreational Area
- Xiaping Natural Education Park
- Momotaro Village

== Events ==
- Chien Chiao Ritual

== Transportation ==
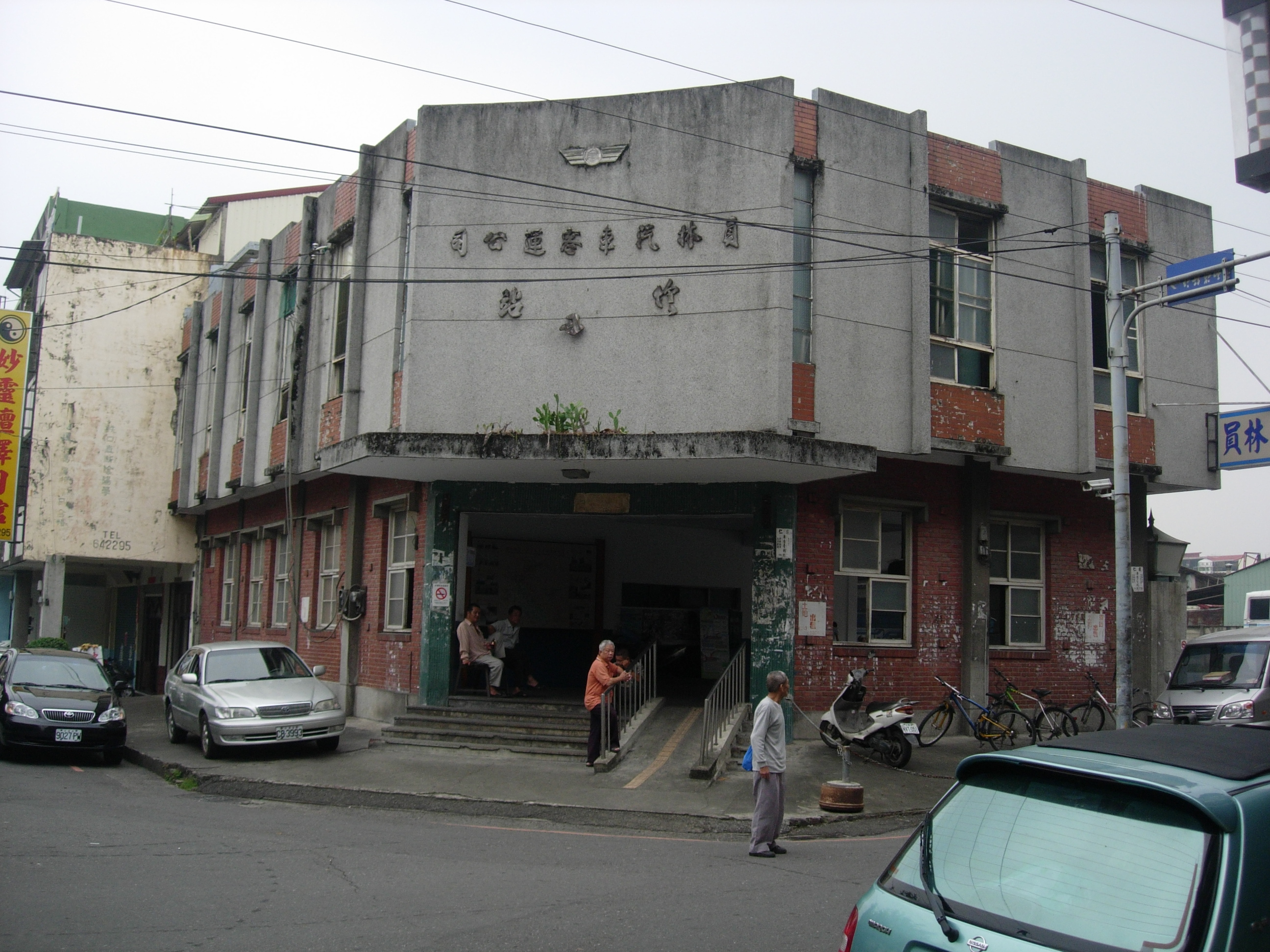
Zhushan Bus Station

- Railway: no through here, but can boarding the train at Ershui Station.
- Highway: Tai 3 Line, through downtown of Zhushan
- Formosa Freeway Nat'l No.3 Zhushan IC at 243.7 km.

== Notable natives ==
- Min Kao, American businessperson
