= Zhuoshui River =

River in western Taiwan

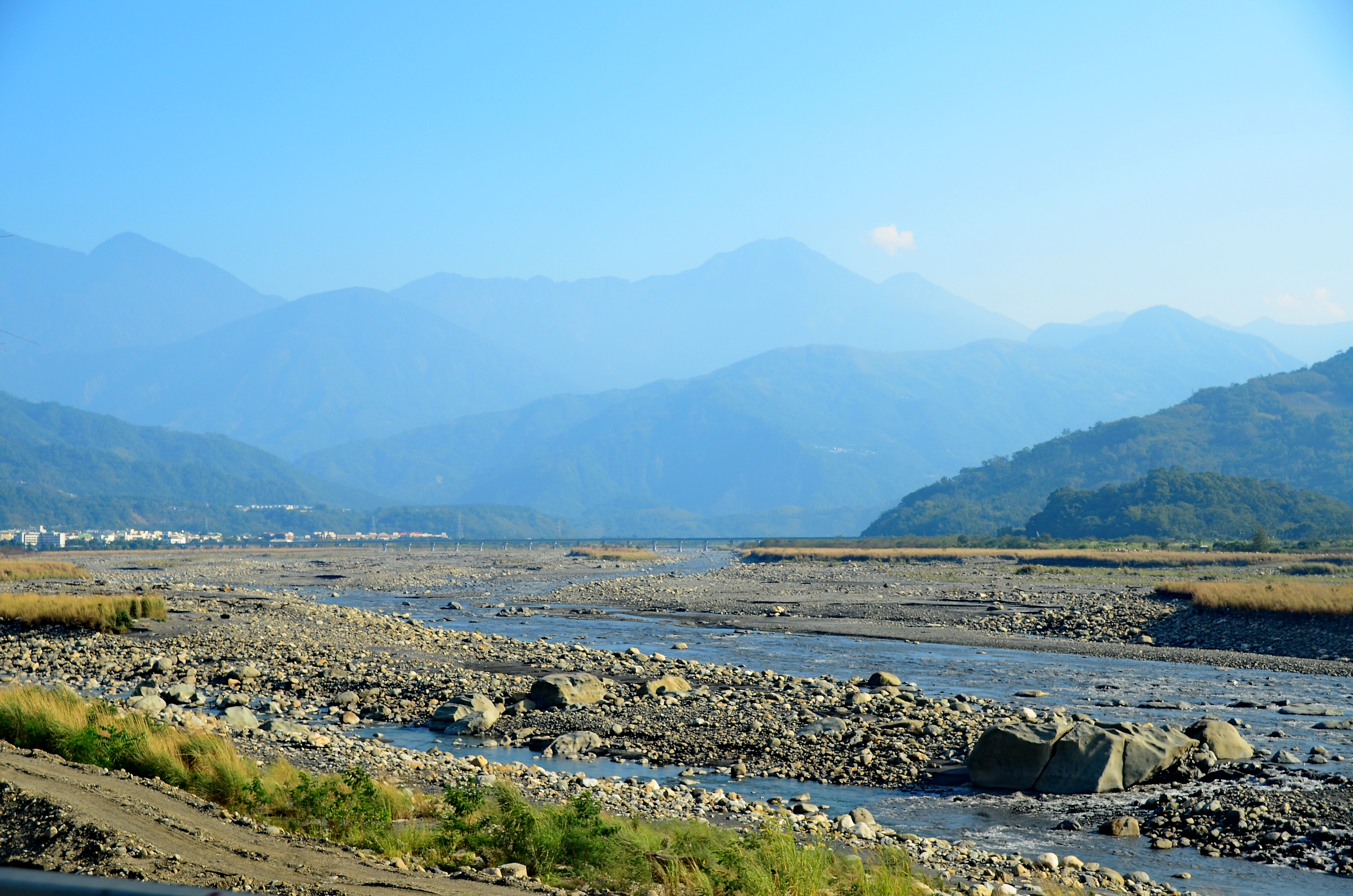

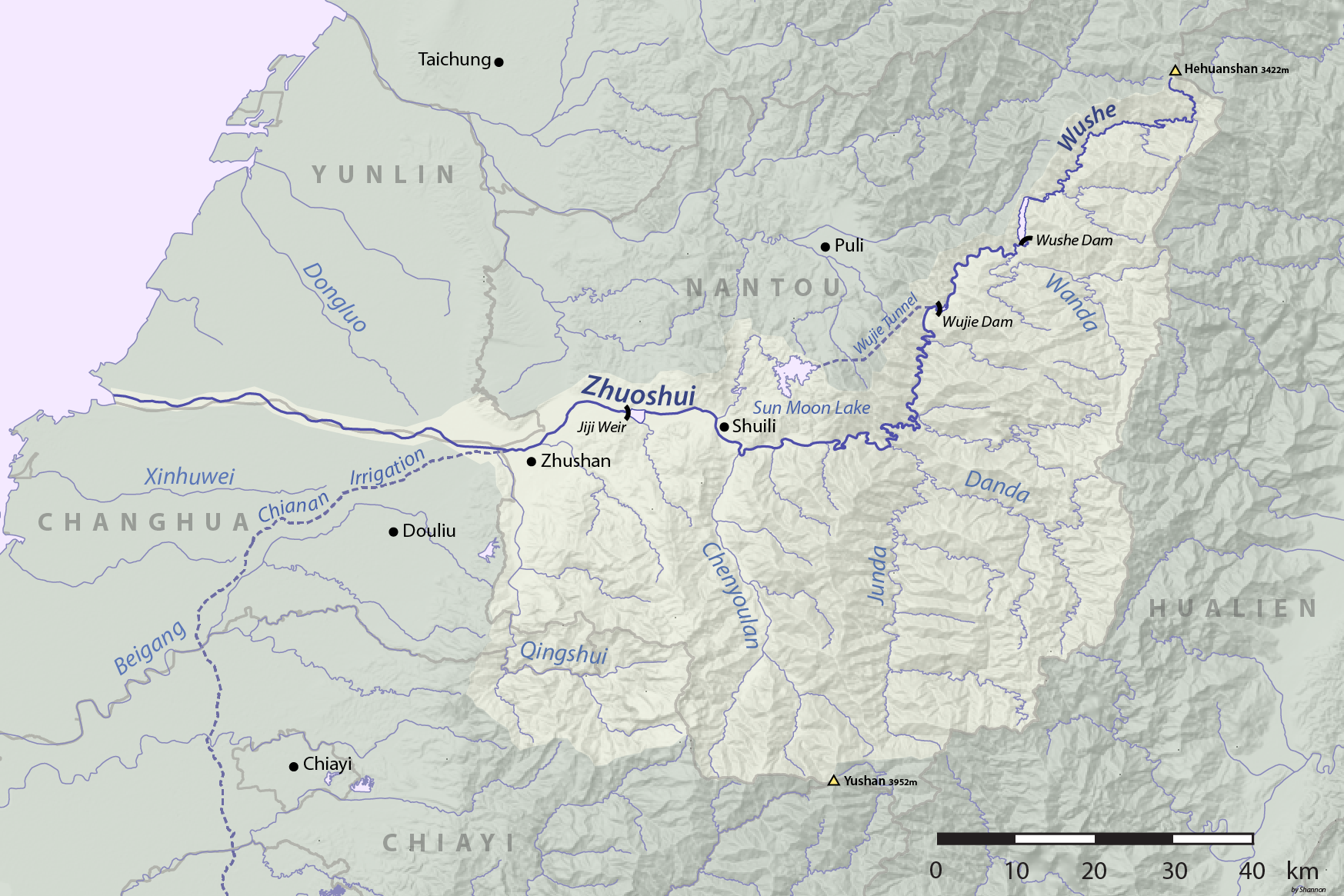

- Location within Taiwan
- Native name: 濁水溪 (Chinese)

Location
- Country: Republic of China
- Province: Taiwan
- Counties: Changhua, Chiayi, Nantou, Yunlin

Physical characteristics
- Source: Wushe River (霧社溪)
  - location: Hehuanshan East Peak, Nantou County
- Mouth
  - location: Between Changhua County and Yunlin County
  - coordinates: 23°50′26″N 120°14′19″E
- Length: 203 km (126 mi)
- Basin size: 3,155.21 km^{2} (1,218.23 sq mi)
- Discharge
  - average: 164.8 m^{3}/s (5,820 cu ft/s)
  - maximum: 14,000 m^{3}/s (490,000 cu ft/s)

Basin features
- Tributaries
  - left: Chingshui River, Chenyoulan River, Kashe River, and others
  - right: Shuili River, and others
- Bridges: Xiluo Bridge

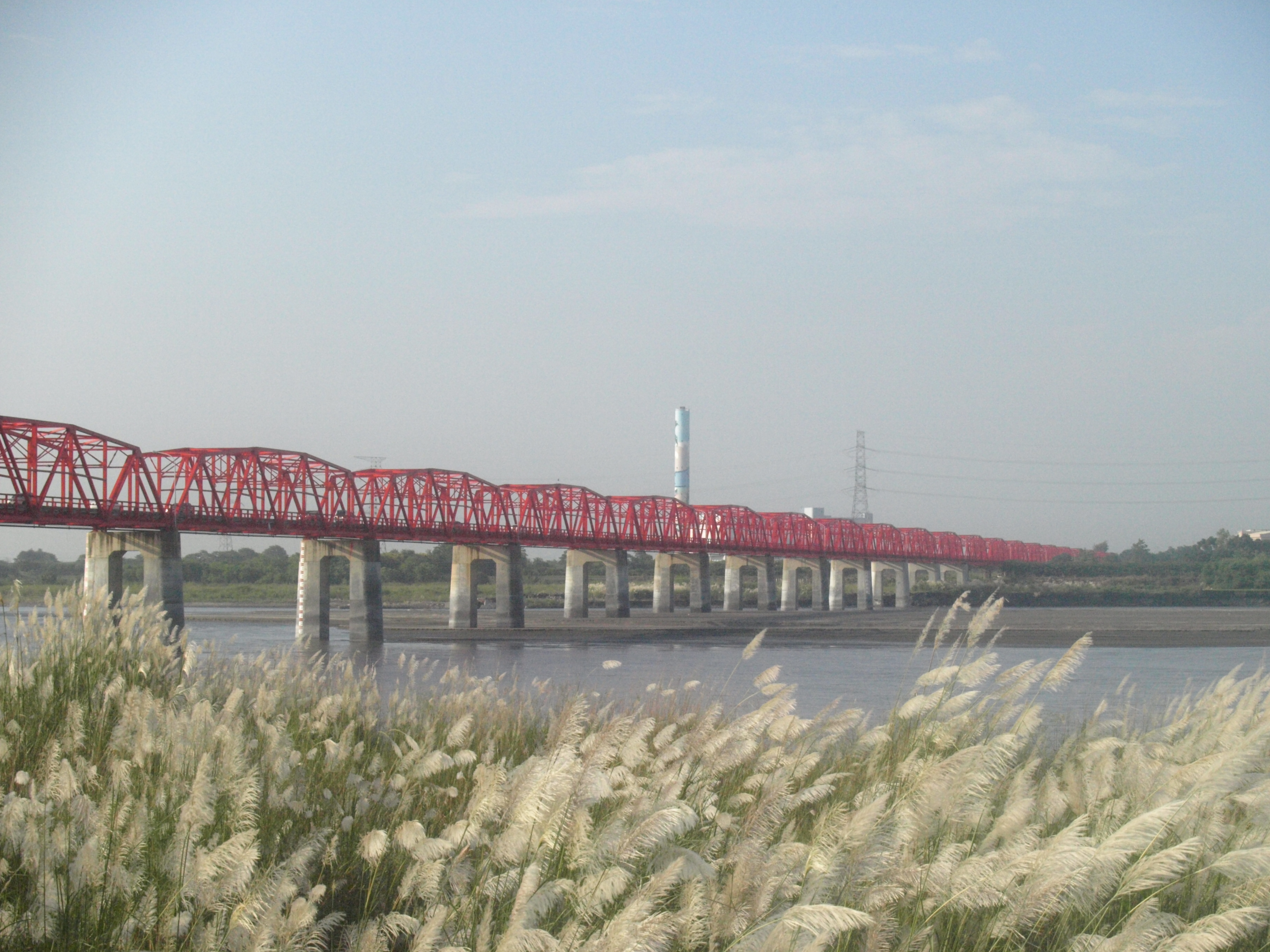
The Xiluo Bridge over the Zhuoshui River

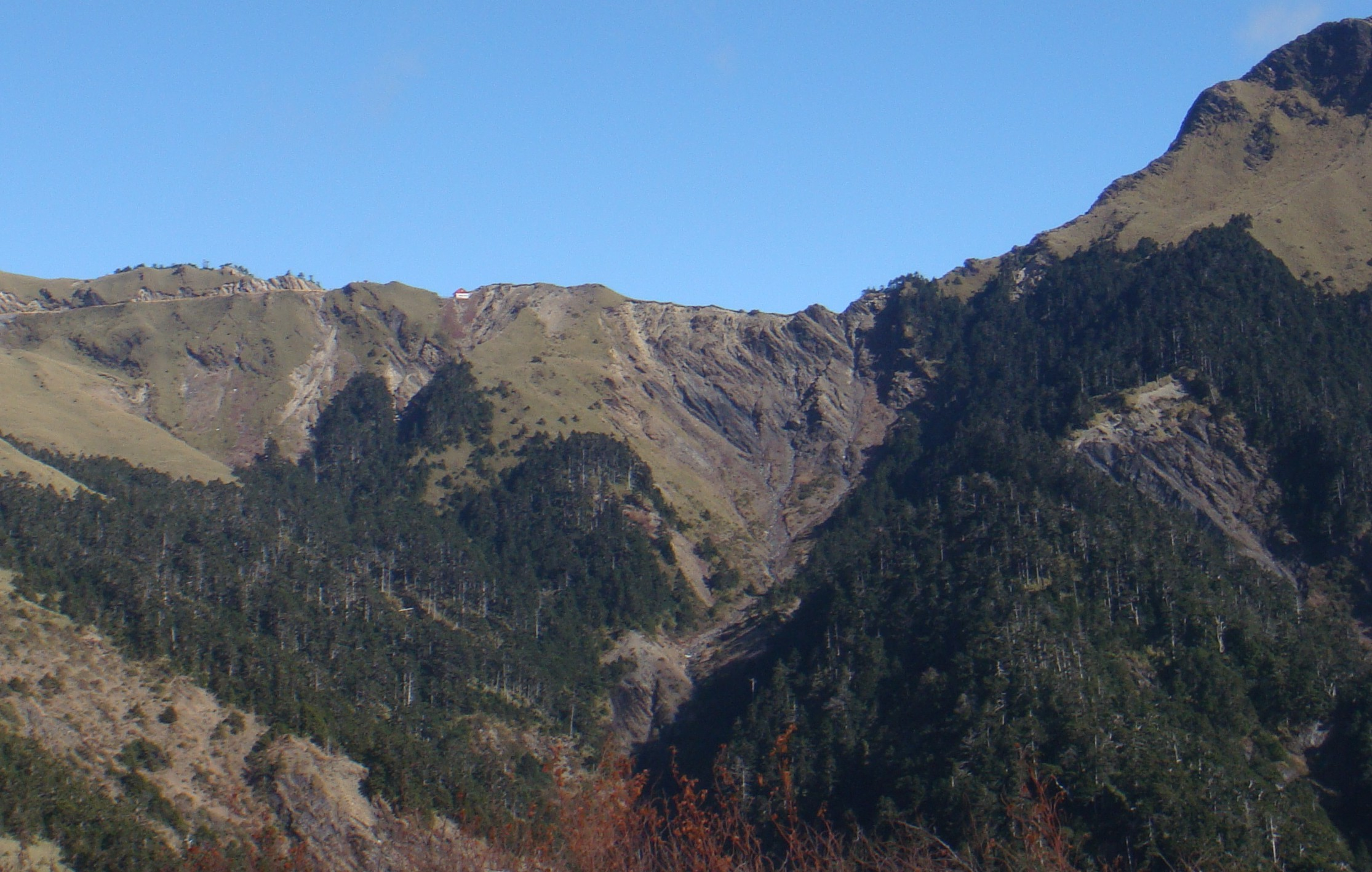
The source of the Zhuoshui River at Wuling in Hehuanshan

The Zhuoshui River (Chinese: 濁水溪 (Note: Hanyu Pinyin: Zhuóshuǐ Xī; Tongyong Pinyin: Jhuóshuěi Si; Wade–Giles: Cho^{2}-shui^{3} Hsi^{1}; Pe̍h-ōe-jī: Lô-chúi-khoe)), also spelled Choshui or Jhuoshuei River, is the longest river in Taiwan, with a total length of 203 km (126 mi). It flows from its source in Nantou County up to the western border of the county, subsequently forming the border between Yunlin County and Changhua County. The river serves as an unofficial boundary between the north and south of Taiwan.

The river is dammed in its upper reaches by the Wushe and Wujie Dams, and further downstream by the Jiji Weir. In recent years, the environment surrounding the river has been seriously degraded both by the construction of a dam across the river at Jiji and by the ongoing activities of the concrete industry.

== Tributaries ==
- Chenyoulan River
- Shuili River
- Kashe River

== Bridges ==
- Xiluo Bridge

== Dams ==
- Jiji Weir
- Wujie Dam

== See also ==
- List of rivers of Taiwan
- Regions of Taiwan
