= Chenyoulan River =

River in Nantou County, Taiwan

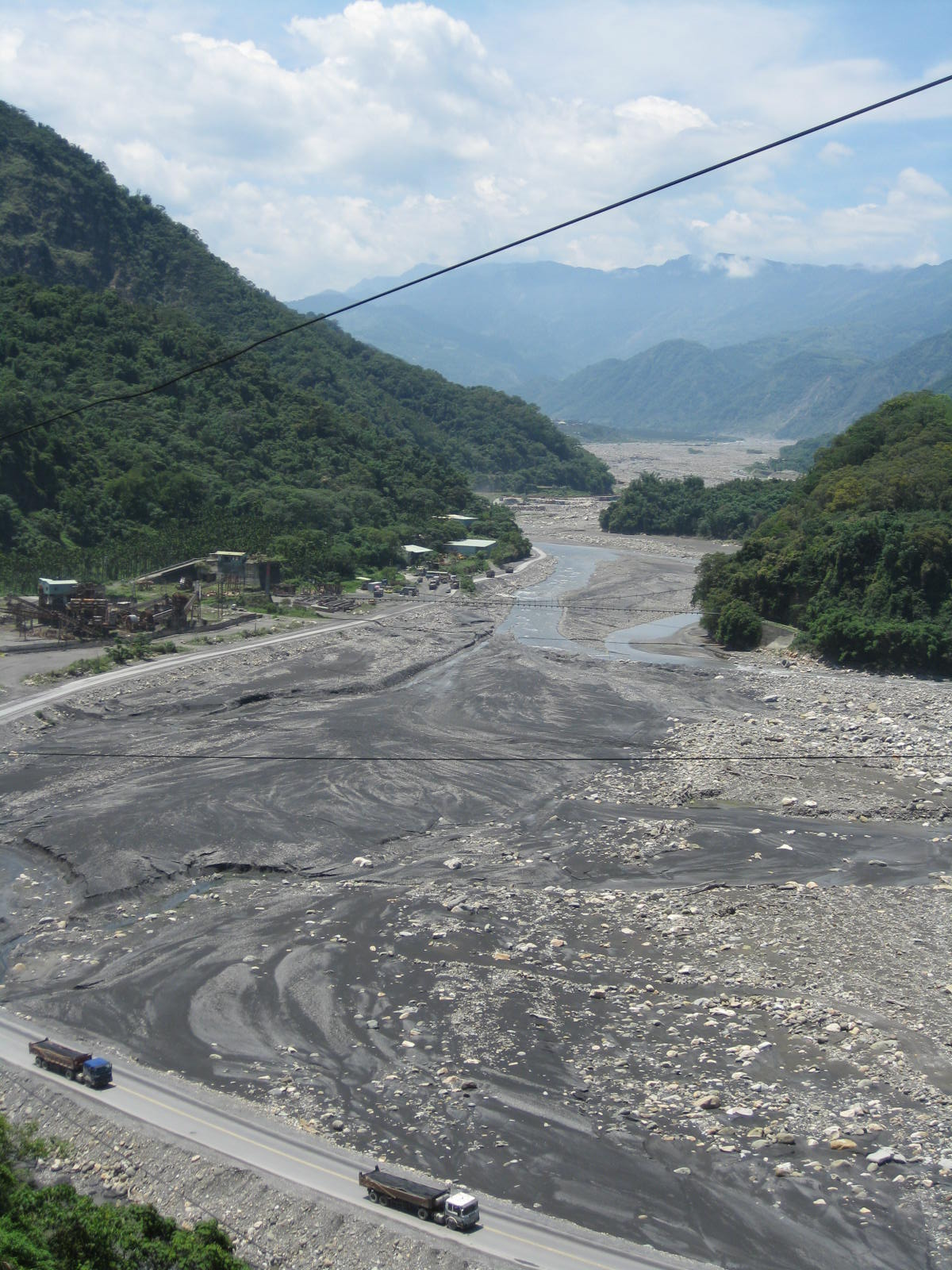

- Chenyoulan River at its confluence with Zhuoshui River
- Native name: 陳有蘭溪 (Chinese)

Location
- Country: Taiwan

Physical characteristics
- Source
  - location: Mount Yushan
- Mouth
  - location: Zhuoshui River at Shuili, Nantou
  - coordinates: 23.779°N 120.866°E
- Length: 42.4 km (26.3 mi)
- Basin size: 448 km^{2} (173 sq mi)
- Discharge
  - maximum: 2,500 m^{3}/s (88,000 cu ft/s)

Basin features
- River system: Zhuoshui River basin

The Chenyoulan River or Chenyulan River (Chinese: 陳有蘭溪; Pe̍h-ōe-jī: Tân-iú-lân-khe) is a river in Nantou County, Taiwan. It is a tributary of the Zhuoshui River. Villages in the water shed include Dongpu and Fengqui. Its tributary streams are Junkeng, Shibachong, Shalixian, Heshe and Neimaopu Streams. The catchment area is 450 m^{2} and its length is 42.4 km. The average slope is 5%. The upper reaches drain the north slopes of Yushan up to 3910 metres elevation. The path of the river has been set by the Chenyulan fault.
