= Jiji Weir =

Weir in Nantou County, Taiwan

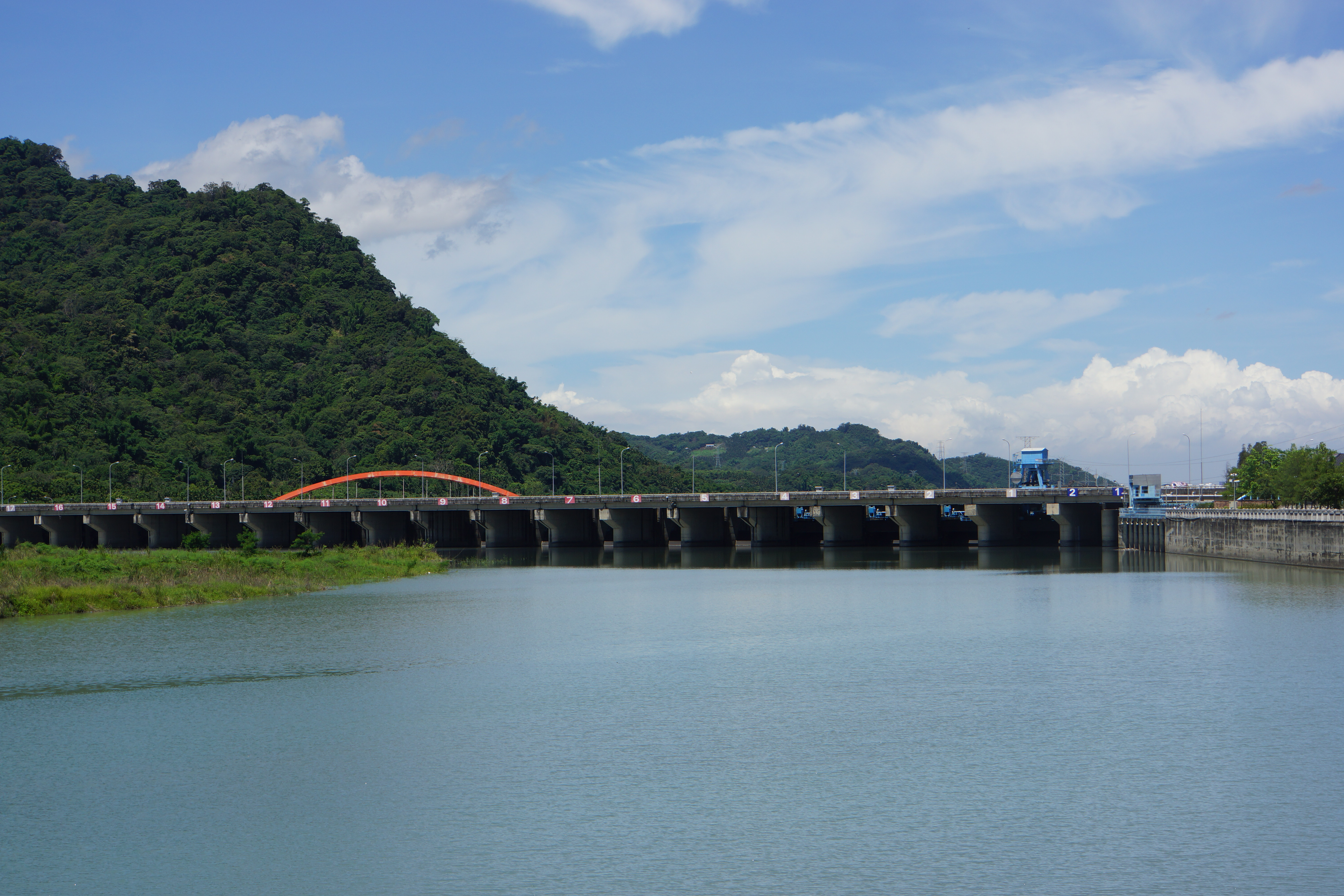

- Location within Nantou County
- Interactive map of Jiji Weir
- Official name: 集集攔河堰
- Location: Nantou County, Taiwan
- Coordinates: 23°49′05.7″N 120°45′47.3″E
- Purpose: water supply
- Status: Operational
- Construction began: July 1990
- Opening date: December 2001

Dam and spillways
- Impounds: Zhuoshui River

The Jiji Weir (traditional Chinese: 集集攔河堰; simplified Chinese: 集集拦河堰; pinyin: Jíjí Lán Héyàn) is a weir located in Nantou County, Taiwan. The weir is located at the border of Jiji Township, Lugu Township and Zhushan Township. It is currently the biggest weir in Taiwan.

== History ==
The construction of the weir started in July 1990, and was completed in December 2001.

== Architecture ==
The weir features the Taiwan Water Museum (Chinese: 臺灣水資源館; pinyin: Táiwān Shuǐ Zīyuán Guǎn) within Jiji Township border.

== Transportation ==
The weir is accessible southwest of Jiji station of Taiwan Railway.

== See also ==
- List of dams and reservoirs in Taiwan
