= Mingtan Dam =

Dam in Shuili, Nantou County, Taiwan

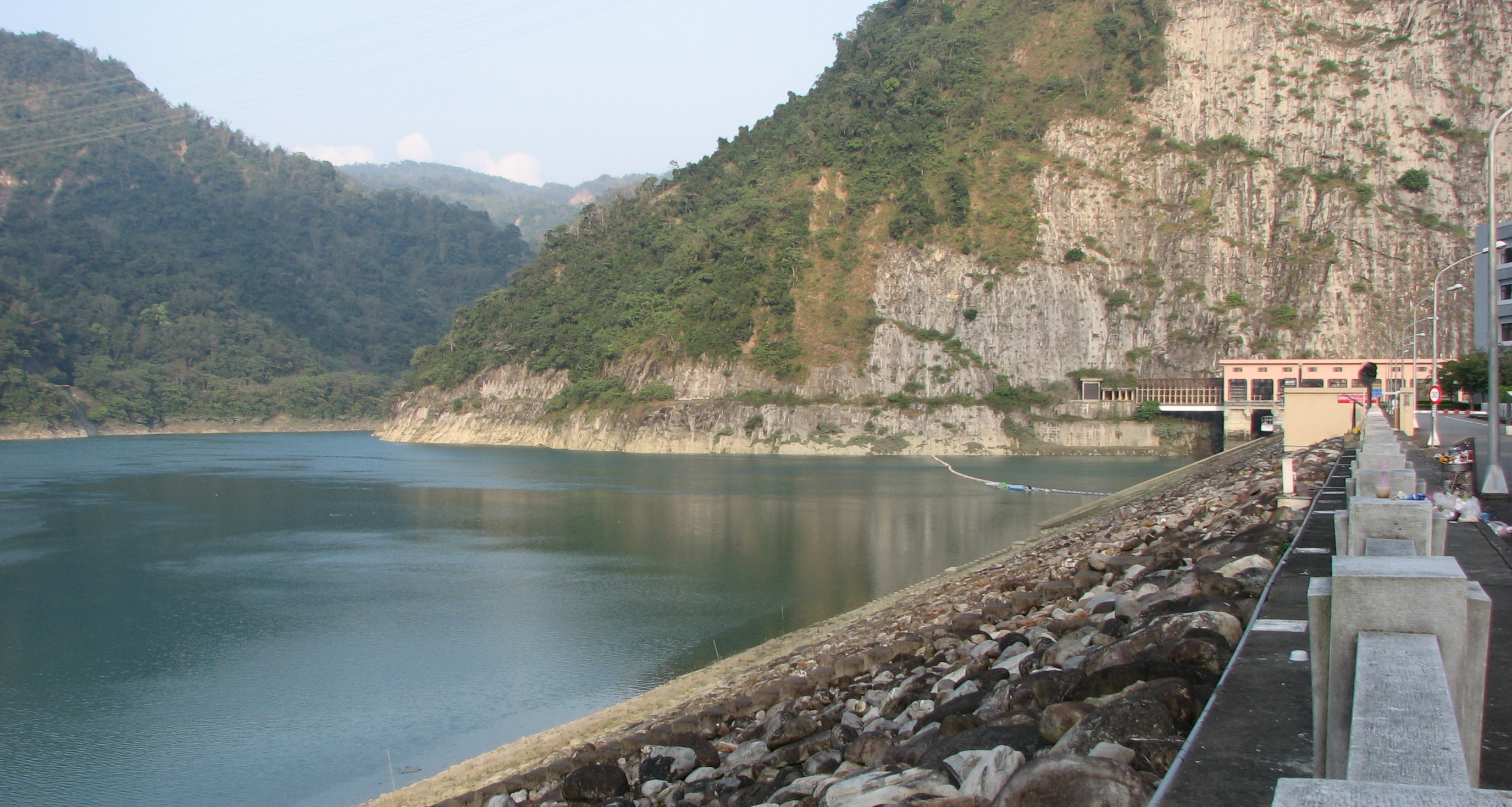

- Location within Nantou County
- Official name: 明潭壩
- Location: Shuili, Nantou County, Taiwan
- Coordinates: 23°50′11″N 120°52′04″E
- Construction began: 1987; 39 years ago
- Opening date: 1995; 31 years ago

Dam and spillways
- Type of dam: Concrete gravity
- Impounds: Shuili River
- Height (foundation): 61.5 m (202 ft)
- Length: 314 m (1,030 ft)
- Spillway capacity: 2,550 m^{3}/s (90,000 cu ft/s)

Reservoir
- Creates: Mingtan Reservoir
- Total capacity: 14,000,000 m^{3} (11,000 acre⋅ft)
- Catchment area: 590.3 km^{2} (227.9 mi^{2})

Power Station
- Turbines: 6 x 267 MW (358,000 hp) Francis pump-turbines
- Installed capacity: 1,602 MW (2,148,000 hp)

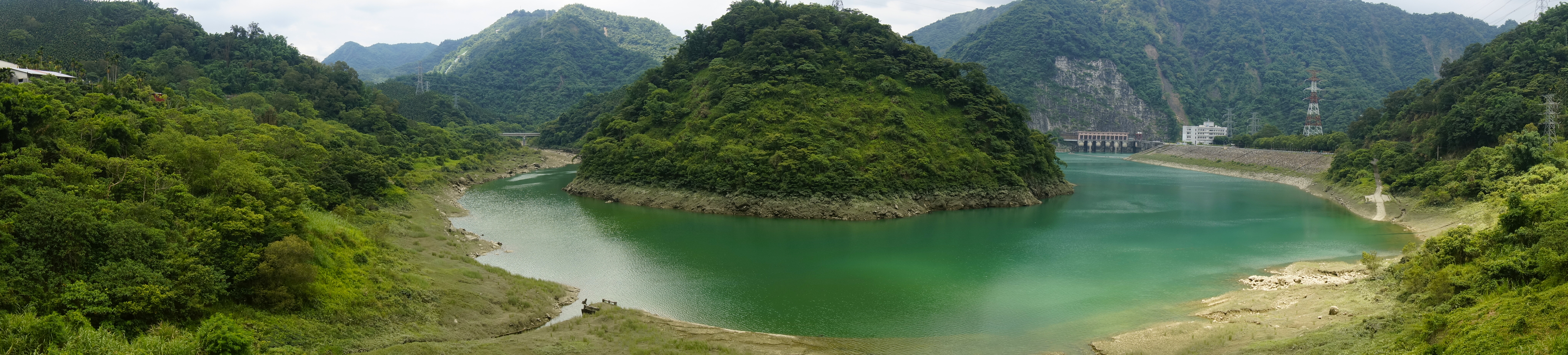
Mingtan Reservoir

The Mingtan Dam (Chinese: 明潭壩; pinyin: Míngtán Bà) is a dam that spans the Shuili River about 4 km (2.5 mi) downstream from the outlet of Sun Moon Lake in central Taiwan with a height of about 61.5 m (202 ft). It forms Mingtan Reservoir which is the lower reservoir for the Mingtan Pumped Storage Hydro Power Plant.

== History ==
To meet the demand of the ever-increasing peak load in Taiwan and to fully utilize off-peak power, the Taiwan Power Company (Taipower) had entrusted European consultants to undertake feasibility study since 1973. The study showed the feasibility of constructing Mingtan Dam to meet such peak load demand, to avoid expanding current fossil-fuel power plants in Taiwan and to have lower operational cost. The dam was completed in 1994 and opened a year later. During the 7.7-magnitude 1999 Jiji earthquake, Mingtan was one of eight dams that sustained damage, but did not collapse.

== Mingtan Pumped Storage Hydro Power Plant ==
The Mingtan Pumped Storage Hydro Power Plant is the largest hydroelectric power plant in Taiwan. It uses Sun Moon Lake as the upper reservoir and Shuili River reservoir as lower reservoir. During high power demand, water used for power generation from Sun Moon Lake, as well as Shuili River, fills Mingtan Reservoir. During low demand, the water is pumped back upstream to the lake. This system can generate up to 1,602 megawatts (2,148,000 hp) at peak production.

== Transportation ==
The dam is accessible within walking distance North from Checheng Station of the Taiwan Railway Jiji Line.

== See also ==
- Minghu Dam – located upstream with another pumped-storage power plant
- List of dams and reservoirs in Taiwan
- List of power stations in Taiwan
- List of pumped-storage hydroelectric power stations
- Electricity sector in Taiwan
