= Minghu Dam =

Dam in Shuili, Nantou County, Taiwan

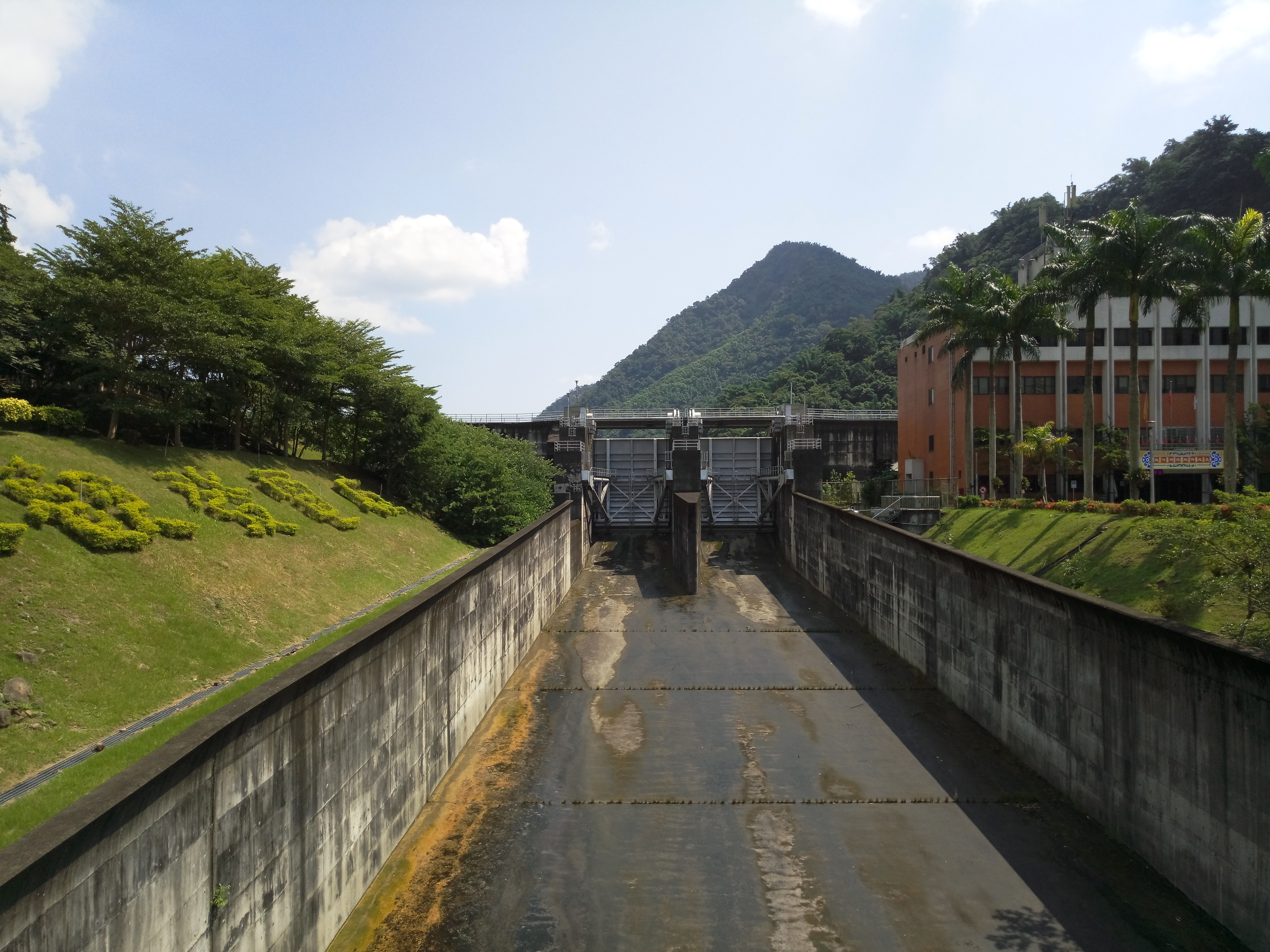

- Location within Nantou County
- Official name: Takuan Power Plant
- Location: Shuili, Nantou County, Taiwan
- Coordinates: 23°51′16″N 120°52′13″E
- Status: Operational
- Construction began: 1980; 46 years ago
- Opening date: 1 August 1985; 40 years ago

Dam and spillways
- Type of dam: Gravity
- Impounds: Shuili River
- Height: 57.5 m (189 ft)
- Length: 169.5 m (556 ft)

Reservoir
- Total capacity: 9,756,000 m^{3} (7,909 acre⋅ft)

Power Station
- Turbines: 4 x 252 MW (338,000 hp) Francis pump-turbines
- Installed capacity: 1,008 MW (1,352,000 hp)

The Minghu Dam (Chinese: 明湖水壩; pinyin: Mínghú Shuǐbà, renamed the Takuan Dam, is a concrete gravity dam on the Shuili River located 7 km (4.3 mi) north of Shuili Township in Nantou County, Taiwan. The reservoir formed by the dam serves as the lower reservoir for the Minhu Pumped Storage Hydro Power Station. Sun Moon Lake serves as the upper reservoir.

The dam and the power plant was constructed in 1980 and opened on 1 August 1985. Upon completion, it became Taiwan's first pumped-storage hydroelectricity power plant.

== Takuan Power Plant ==
The pumped-storage hydroelectricity power plant, officially named Takuan Power Plant, which sits near the left abutment of the dam and moves water between the two reservoirs to generate electricity. During periods of low demand, such as at night, when electricity is cheap, water is pumped to Sun Moon Lake. When energy demand is high, water is released down to the power station for power generation. This is accomplished by four 252 megawatts (338,000 hp) Francis pump-turbine-generators which are reversible and serve to both pump water and generate electricity. The power plant has an installed capacity of 1,008 megawatts (1,352,000 hp).

== See also ==
- List of dams and reservoirs in Taiwan
- List of power stations in Taiwan
- List of pumped-storage hydroelectric power stations
- Electricity sector in Taiwan
