= Indo Burmese pangolin =

Indo Burmese pangolin Temporal range: 3.4–0 Ma late Pliocene

Scientific classification
- Kingdom: Animalia
- Phylum: Chordata
- Class: Mammalia
- Order: Pholidota
- Family: Manidae
- Genus: Manis
- Species: M. aurita

Binomial name
- Manis aurita B. H. Hodgson, 1836

Synonyms
- Manis plurisquamis B. H. Hodgson, 1836; Manis aurita G. R. Waterhouse, 1838; Pholidotus assamensis Fitzinger, 1872; Pholidotus auritus Fitzinger, 1872; Pangolinus auritus E. Blyth, 1875; Manis pentadactyla aurita Ellerman & Morrison-Scott, 1951; Manis pentadactyla auritus Schlitter, 2005; Manis indoburmanica Wangmo et al., 2025

Species of mammal

Indo-Burmese pangolin (Manis aurita), is a pangolin in the family Manidae native to India, Myanmar, Nepal, and possibly Bhutan. While it was described in 2025 as a new species, Manis indoburmanica, it had been previously described as Manis aurita by Brian Houghton Hodgson in 1836.

== Taxonomy ==
A 2025 study by scientists from the Zoological Survey of India of genetic material from pangolins from the Indian state of Arunachal Pradesh, revealed a new species that was distinct from the extant Chinese pangolin (Manis pentadactyla). The study estimated that the new species might have diverged from the Chinese pangolin approximately 3.4 million years ago, and proposed to name the species as Indo-Burmese pangolin (Manis indoburmanica). However, the species name aurita was prioritized over indoburmanica as the type it was attributed to had been previously described by Brian Houghton Hodgson by that name in 1836.

In a 2026 reassessment and phylogenetic analysis of the species, it was affirmed as a sister taxon to M. pentadactyla, with this clade forming a sister group to one including all other species of the genus Manis. These results are summarized in the cladogram below:

- Manis
  - - Manis aurita (Indo-Burmese pangolin)
    - Manis pentadactyla (Chinese pangolin )
  - - Manis crassicaudata (Indian pangolin)
    - - Manis mysteria (cryptic pangolin)
      - Manis javanica (Sunda pangolin)

== Description ==
The Indo-Burmese pangolin is smaller than the Indian pangolin and is comparable in size to its closest relative, the Chinese pangolin. It has a pink coloured face, and a total body length of 70 cm (28 in). Compared to the Chinese pangolin, which has yellow-brown scales, and Indian pangolin, which has yellowish-brown scales, the Indo-Burmese pangolin has scales that vary in colour from dark brown to olive-brown. It also has small bristles covering the entire body.

== Distribution and habitat ==
The Indo-Burmese pangolin is native to India, Myanmar, Nepal, and possibly Bhutan. In India, it occurs in West Kameng, Papum Pare, Upper Subansiri, East Siang Districts in Arunachal Pradesh, Kokrajhar District in Assam, and other states of North East India. It is also found in Eastern Nepal and northwestern Myanmar. The species is generally found at elevations ranging from 180 to 1,830 m (590 to 6,000 ft).

== Threats and conservation ==
The Indo-Burmese pangolin faces threat primarily from poaching and illegal trafficking across South and South East Asia, and pangolins are generally exploited for their scales which are used in folk medicine. While certain other species of pangolins are protected under Appendix I of CITES, the family is part of Appendix II, under which limited trade is permitted, and as a new species, the Indo-Burmese pangolin is not listed. According to the Environmental Investigation Agency, if independently assessed, the Indo-Burmese pangolin is likely to be classified as critically endangered.
