= Chen Chih-pin =

Taiwanese politician (born 1949)

Chen Chih-pin MLY
- 陳志彬

Member of the Legislative Yuan
- In office 1 February 1993 – 21 December 1998
- Constituency: Nantou County
- In office 1 February 2002 – 31 January 2008
- Constituency: Nantou County

Member of the Taiwan Provincial Assembly
- In office 20 December 1985 – 20 December 1989
- Constituency: Nantou County

Nantou County Councilor
- In office 30 December 1977 – 1 March 1982

Personal details
- Born: 1 April 1949 (age 77) Nantou County, Taiwan
- Party: Kuomintang
- Other political affiliations: People First Party (2001–2006)
- Education: National Taipei University (BA)

Chinese name
- Traditional Chinese: 陳志彬
Transcriptions
Standard Mandarin
- Hanyu Pinyin: Chén Zhìbīn
- Bopomofo: ㄔㄣˊ ㄓˋ ㄅㄧㄣ
- Wade–Giles: Chen2 Chih4 pin1
Yue: Cantonese
- Jyutping: Can4 Zi3 ban1
Southern Min
- Hokkien POJ: Tân Chìpin

Chen Chih-pin (born 1 April 1949) is a Taiwanese politician. He served on the Nantou County Council, the Taiwan Provincial Assembly, and the Legislative Yuan.

== Education ==
Chen attended primary and middle school in Caotun, Nantou, and graduated from the Taichung Second Senior High School before earning his degree from National Chung Hsing University's Taipei campus. He also took classes at the Institute of Revolutionary Practice.

== Political career ==
Chen served on the Nantou County Council from 1977 to 1982, represented Nantou County on the Taiwan Provincial Assembly between 1985 and 1989, and was a member of the Legislative Yuan from 1993 to 1998, and 2002 to 2008. During his tenure on the Legislative Yuan's Finance Committee in 2002, Chen questioned finance minister Lee Yung-san about the business practices of Taiwanese businessmen in China.

For most of his political career, Chen was affiliated with the Kuomintang. Between 2001 and 2006, he held People First Party membership, and was the PFP caucus whip within the Legislative Yuan in 2005. As caucus whip, Chen commented on China's Anti-Secession Law, the 319 Democracy, Peace and Truth rally held on the one-year anniversary of the March 19 shooting incident during the 2004 presidential election cycle, the relationship between the Democratic Progressive Party and the People First Party following Lien Chan's April 2005 visit to China, as well as the DPP's win in the 2005 National Assembly election, and the PFP's decision to boycott arms procurement bills through May 2005.

Before the 2005 local elections, the PFP selected Chen as its candidate for the Nantou County magistracy. After polls were conducted, the PFP and KMT chose to consolidate support for Kuomintang candidate Lee Chao-ching. Chen considered running for the county magistracy again in the 2009 local elections, but ended his bid in October, citing financial concerns.
