= Nantou County Culture Park =

Cultural center in Nantou City, Nantou County, Taiwan

- 南投縣文化園區
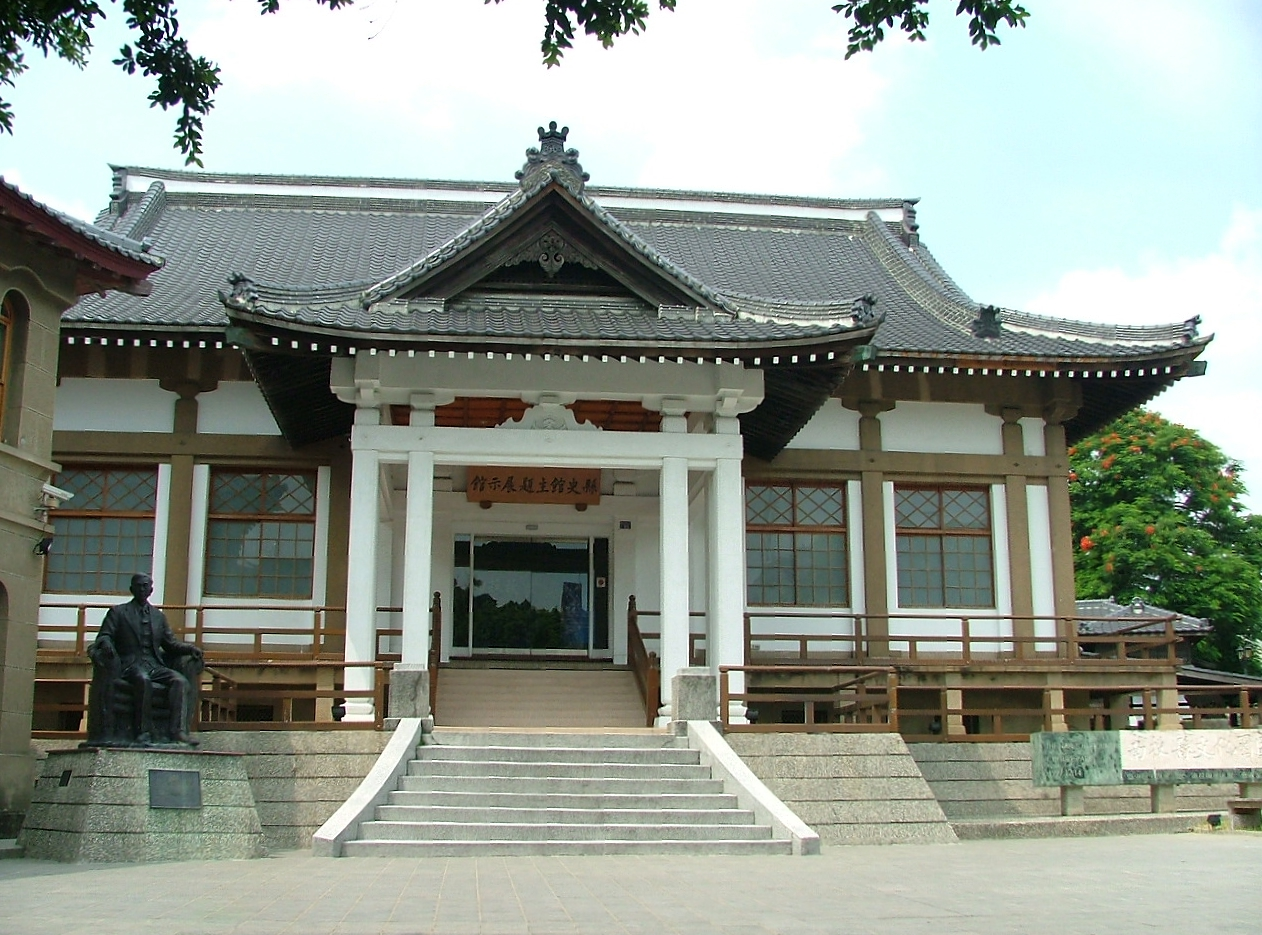
- Interactive map of the Nantou County Culture Park area

General information
- Location: Nantou City, Nantou County, Taiwan
- Coordinates: 23°54′34.2″N 120°41′03.3″E
- Completed: 1937
- Owner: Cultural Affairs Bureau of Nantou County Government

The Nantou County Culture Park (NCCP; traditional Chinese: 南投縣文化園區; simplified Chinese: 南投县文化园区; pinyin: Nántóu Xiàn Wénhuà Yuánqū) is a historical building in Nantou City, Nantou County, Taiwan.

== History ==
The park's main building, County History Hall, was built in 1937 as the Wude Temple. The structure later served various purposes, such as a butokuden, a police department and other government offices.

In December 1996, the preparatory office to establish the venue was set up. The area was unveiled as Nantou County History Hall in 1997 but soon later it was closed due to 921 earthquake in 1999. After a year of reparation, it was reopened to the public in 2000. Adjacent to the County History Hall is the Art Archive Hall which was originally built in 1952. It was later changed to its current use in 2003.

== Exhibitions ==
- County History Hall
- Nantou Pottery Exhibition Hall
- County History Reference Hall
- Art Archive Hall

== See also ==
- List of tourist attractions in Taiwan
