= Shuiyuan Suspension Bridge =

Suspension bridge in Xinyi, Nantou County, Taiwan

Shuiyuan Suspension Bridge 雙龍七彩吊橋
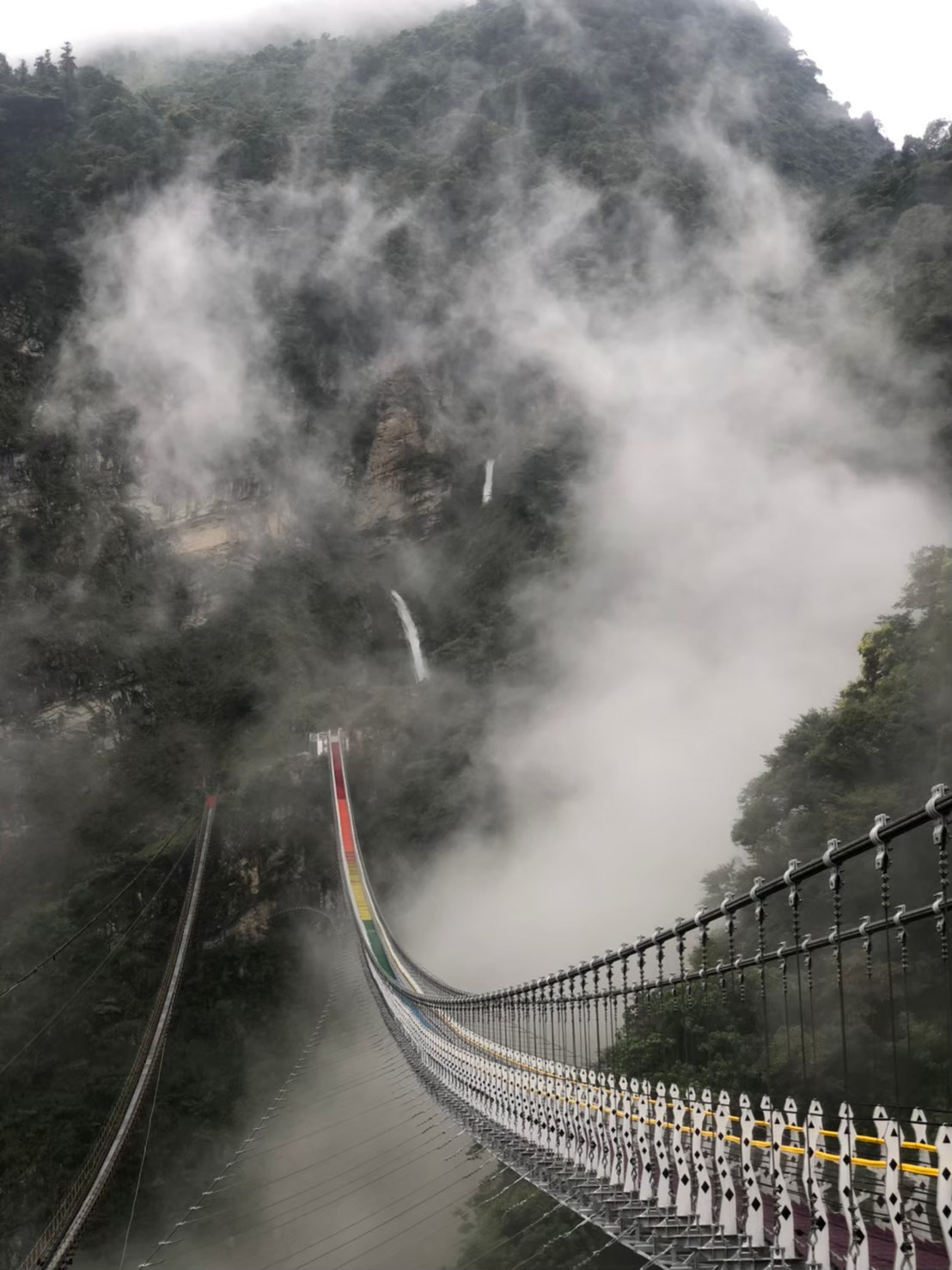
- Coordinates: 23°46′44.3″N 120°57′00.4″E
- Locale: Xinyi, Nantou County, Taiwan

Characteristics
- Design: suspension bridge
- Total length: 342 meters
- Clearance below: 110 meters

History
- Construction cost: NT$60 million
- Opened: 1 January 2020

Location
- Interactive map of Shuiyuan Suspension Bridge

The Shuiyuan Suspension Bridge or Shuanglong Rainbow Suspension Bridge (traditional Chinese: 雙龍七彩吊橋; simplified Chinese: 双龙七彩吊桥; pinyin: Shuānglóng Qīcǎi Diàoqiáo) is a suspension bridge in Xinyi Township, Nantou County, Taiwan.

== History ==
The bridge was constructed at a cost of NT$60 million with funding from Nantou County Government, Sun Moon Lake National Scenic Area Administration, and Xinyi Township Office. It was opened to the public on 1 January 2020.

== Architecture ==
The bridge features alternate different color for every 50 meters of its length.

== Technical specifications ==
The bridge spans over a length of 342 meters with 110 meters of clearance below it. It was constructed in parallel with the older bridge built earlier.

== Transportation ==
The bridge is accessible by bus from Shuili Station of Taiwan Railway.

== See also ==
- List of bridges in Taiwan
