= Nantou County =

Nantou County 南投縣 Nan-t'ou
- County
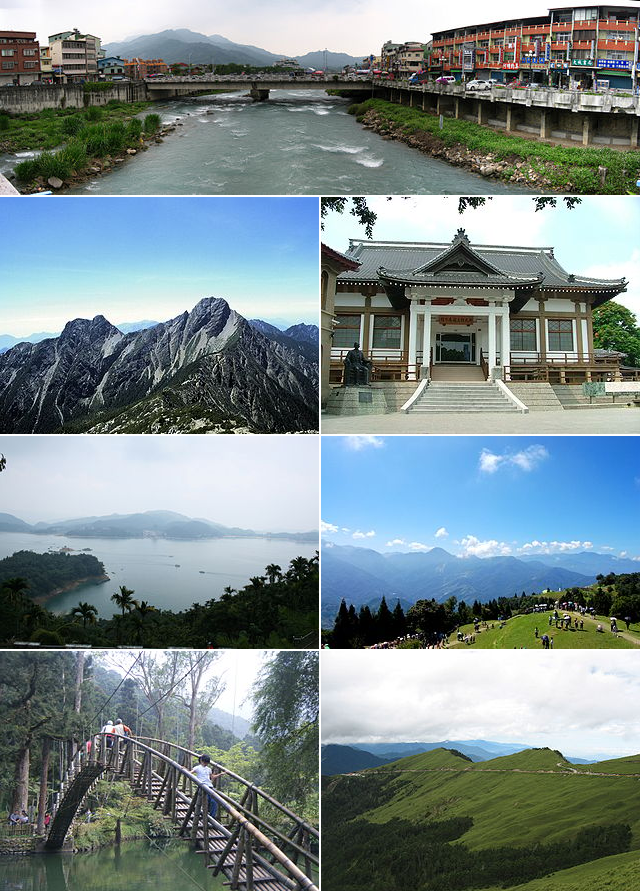
- Top：Shuili Water Creek in Shuili Township, 2nd left:Mount Yu, 2nd right:Nantou County Museum of History in Nantou City, 3rd left:View of Sun Moon Lake, from Xuanzang Temple in Yuchi Township, 3rd right:Evergreen Glassland in Renci Township, Bottom left:Tou George Pond in Taiwan Educational University of Nature, Bottom right:Mount Hehuan

- Flag Logo

- Coordinates: 23°54′9″N 120°41′24″E
- Country: Republic of China (Taiwan)
- Province: Taiwan^{a}
- Seat: Nantou City
- Largest city: Nantou City
- Boroughs: 1 city, 12 (4 urban, 8 rural) townships

Government
  - Body: Nantou County Government; Nantou County Council
  - County Magistrate: Hsu Shu-hua (KMT)

Area
  - Total: 4,106.436 km^{2} (1,585.504 sq mi)
  - Rank: 2 of 22

Population (January 2023)
  - Total: 479,666
  - Rank: 15 of 22
  - Density: 116.808/km^{2} (302.532/sq mi)
- Time zone: UTC+8 (National Standard Time)
- ISO 3166 code: TW-NAN
- Website: www.nantou.gov.tw
- Symbols
- Flower: Plum blossom (Prunus mume)
- Tree: Camphor laurel (Cinnamomum camphora)
- ^{a} In Taiwan, provinces remain a nominal division according to the Taiwanese constitution, but are no longer considered to have any administrative function practically.

Nantou County
- Traditional Chinese: 南投縣
Transcriptions
Standard Mandarin
- Hanyu Pinyin: Nántóu Xiàn
- Bopomofo: ㄋㄢˊ ㄊㄡˊ ㄒㄧㄢˋ
- Gwoyeu Romatzyh: Nantour Shiann
- Wade–Giles: Nan²-tʻou² Hsien⁴
- Tongyong Pinyin: Nántóu Siàn
- MPS2: Nántóu Shiàn
- IPA: [nǎn.tʰǒʊ ɕjɛ̂n]
Hakka
- Pha̍k-fa-sṳ: Nàm-thèu-yen
Southern Min
- Hokkien POJ: Lâm-tâu-koān
- Tâi-lô: Lâm-tâu-kuān

Nantou (Note: In local languages: Traditional Chinese script: 南投縣; Mandarin Pinyin: Nántóu Xiàn; Hokkien: Lâm-tâu-koān; Sixian Hakka: Nàm-thèu-yen) is the second largest county of Taiwan by area. Located in the central part of the island, and containing its geographic center, it is the only landlocked county in Taiwan. Its landscape is mountainous, with the east containing parts of the Central Mountain Range, including Taiwan's highest mountain, Yu Shan. The diverse landscape supports rare species such as the Taiwanese pangolin and leopard cat, and the county remains home to some of the Taiwanese Indigenous peoples.

What is now Nantou supported a number of indigenous groups that retained autonomy from the central government during the Qing rule of the island. Settlement was initially banned, but in the late 19th century, it was encouraged. Many Hoklo and Hakka people moved in during this period. Under Japanese rule, the area was brought fully under government control, a sometimes violent process that shaped local ethnic identities. The region began to industrialize while also seeing increased agricultural production. Following the retrocession of Taiwan, Nantou County was separated from Taichung County. In the late 20th century, the area saw an increase in tourism, which has become a prominent part of the local economy. Famous sites include Sun Moon Lake, the largest lake in Taiwan.

The county is home to the Thao people, who live around Sun Moon Lake. Other indigenous groups with communities in the area include the Atayal, Bunun, Seediq, Tsou, and various Plains Indigenous peoples. Two of the county's townships are classified as indigenous townships. The total population of the county is around 470,000.

The county is led by a magistrate, who heads the Nantou County Government. The economy still includes extensive agricultural components in addition to tourism, and the region produces hydroelectric power. In modern times, the indigenous people are reflected in the education system, and retain their own cultural practices.

== History ==
=== Early history ===
Before the arrival of Han Chinese to Nantou, the Atayal, Bunun and Tsou tribes were distributed throughout the northern and central Nantou. These groups pioneered the early development of mountain regions in Nantou. The name derives from the Hoanya Taiwanese aboriginal word Ramtau.

=== Kingdom of Tungning ===
In 1677, Lin Yi (Chinese: 林圯), a general under the command of Koxinga, led soldiers to establish residence in Shalianbao (modern-day Zhushan). The Han Chinese began to enter Nantou via two main routes, the Zhuoshui River and Maoluo River.

=== Qing rule ===
Qing administrative divisions in 1894, a few years after Taiwan was established as a separate province

What is now Nantou County was then part of different administrative divisions under Qing rule. However, actual control was limited, with indigenous populations in the area remaining largely isolated. In 1740, Qing authorities assigned the indigenous people the surname Pan. Contact between these people and Han Chinese settlers often resulted in violence. Stone border markers may have been in place as early as 1713. 1723 saw the start of heavy logging in until then-Thao areas. Conflicts erupted in 1725, and in response to an incidence of headhunting by a Thao hunter, in 1726 the Qing governor launched an invasion of the area. The invasion brought an end to the Thao practice of headhunting.

In 1744, Qing authorities banned Han land claims in indigenous land, and in 1752 set out formal border markers which Han Chinese were not allowed to pass. Detailed mapping in 1790 led to further demarcation. During the Lin Shuangwen rebellion in the late 1780s, the Thao people assisted the Qing governor, and became recognized as a "civilized" tribe. The first written record of Sun Moon Lake comes from a 1782 government report.

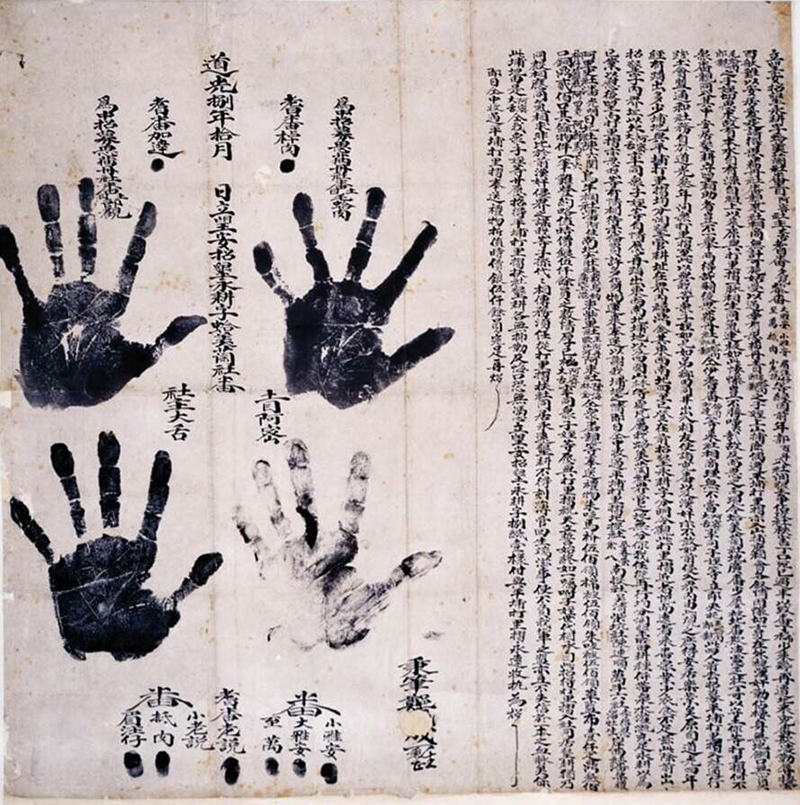
A settlement contract from when the Plains Indigenous peoples moved into the Puli Basin

The Puli basin became an important area for indigenous peoples. In 1814, a group of over 100 Han Chinese led by Guo Bainian massacred indigenous people living in the Puli basin. Guo Bainian was arrested in 1816, and the territory was returned to the Thao. More Thao people migrated to the area from the southwest in 1823. Around 30 Plains Indigenous peoples who had lost territory elsewhere also migrated to the basin, invited by the Thao. This event has been described as a mass migration. Around 3,000 settlement contracts are known from the Puli basin. From 1850 to 1874, there are three recorded official movements of Thao people from other areas to Sun Moon Lake, and new settlements were established. Some Thao became landlords, employers Han farmers. This introduced new agricultural techniques to the area, but also plagues. An alliance between the Thao and the Plains Indigenous peoples led to groups including the Atayal and Seediq being restricted to mountainous areas. The Seediq did have contact with the Qing government however, and were part of recognized chiefdoms. Some of these joined into larger confederations.

In 1848, the local government began to more actively develop the area. Water infrastructure was developed to improve agriculture, and a small number of Han settlers began to enter the area. The ban on Han settlement was removed in 1874. This was part of an initiative to increase government access and control of Taiwan's mountainous areas, launched to counter Japanese claims that there was no effective sovereignty over the area. The government established schools for indigenous children in 1876. In 1877, what would later become Puli town was founded by the military as a base of operations in the area. A local police force was created in 1884, and the town continued to develop throughout the remainder of Qing rule. Former indigenous towns around Sun Moon Lake became majority Chinese. A Chinese school was built on the sacred Lalu Island (then a mountain), and plagues pushed Thao away from the lake while also reducing their numbers. In 1897, the number of Thao was recorded as 352, down from 861 in 1847. Settlement by Hoklo people and Hakka people occurred during this time.

A pottery industry developed in the 19th century around the Maoluo River, and spread to other nearby towns. The region's 20 to 30 kilns included the largest in Taiwan.

=== Japanese rule ===
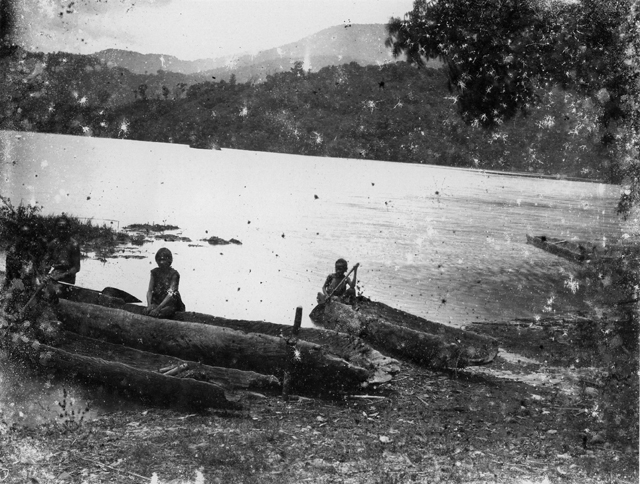
Thao people in 1900

Following the Japanese annexation of Taiwan through the Treaty of Shimonoseki in April 1895, Japanese forces arrived at Puli on 28 July. A civilian government was set up shortly afterwards. In 1901, during Japanese rule, Nanto Chō (Japanese: 南投廳) was one of twenty local administrative offices established. In 1909, part of Toroku Chō (斗六廳) was merged into Nanto Cho. A major reorganization occurred in 1920, in which the area was administered under Taichū Prefecture together with modern-day Changhua County and Taichung City.

It was under Japanese rule that indigenous groups came under the control of the central government. Existing tribal confederations were broken up by Japanese attempts to divide and conquer. Indigenous languages and practices were banned under Japanese rules due to assimilation policies. Facial tattoos, formerly a sign of beauty for women in some groups, were banned. The removal of existing tattoos often left faces disfigured. Those who were not given last names under Qing rule were given last names by the Japanese authorities. In establishing property laws, Japan declared that any land without explicit title was government land. While the western areas of what is now Nantou County were part of normal administrative districts, a mountain district containing what is now eastern Nantou County was considered fully state-owned, with no recognized land title. Around Sun Moon Lake, the Thao and Chinese settlers were relocated to enable the construction of the Mingtan Pumped Storage Hydro Power Plant. Sun Moon Lake was viewed by the government as a potential source of hydropower that could boost industrialization in the area. By 1934, the lake was 7 metres (23 ft) deeper, with many formerly Thao areas thus flooded.

It is likely that Seediq people from Nantou migrated east during the Japanese period. While some likely occurred autonomously, following the 1914 Truku War and the 1930 Musha Incident such resettlement was encouraged and sometimes forced by the government.Following the 1914 war, Japan established schools, clinics, police stations, and Shinto shrines in indigenous areas in an attempt to pacify local tribes. The village of Musha in what is now Nantou County turned into a model village, focused on the harvesting of camphor. However, for reasons that are disputed, on 27 October 1930 more than 300 Tkedaya (Seediq) men from six communities, led by Mona Rudao attacked 12 police stations, killing all Japanese staff. The Japanese staff were preparing to celebrate the 35th anniversary of Japan's annexation of Taiwan. At a planned celebration later that afternoon, a gathering of other Japanese officials and their families was attacked. In total, 134 Japanese were killed. Following the Japanese military response, including both Japanese forces and rival tribes, about half of those communities were either killed or committed suicide. More died during later events, and survivors were relocated. The various relocations under Japanese rule broke up kin groups and brought members of different groups, including hostile ones, into the same settlements. They also shifted people used to living in forests into plains, forcing them out of a hunter-gatherer lifestyle and into the cash economy. Opposition to Japanese actions played a significant role in establishing the ethnic identities of today's indigenous groups. Some indigenous people also have overall fond memories of Japanese rule, especially contrasted with the subsequent rule of the KMT.

The Japanese period also saw the development of a sugar industry driven by the Formosa Sugar Company. A railway was constructed in 1918 linking Nantou County with Taichung for sugar export. The construction of the Mingtan Pumped Storage Hydro Power Plant also saw the construction of the 29.7 kilometres (18.5 mi) Jiji line. Finished in 1922, this line significant enhanced the capacity of goods transport between the interior and the coast. Economic growth occurred along the line. The Jiji line and a sugar line both had a western terminus at Ershui railway station, and ran parallel until Zhuoshui railway station. From there, the sugar line went north towards Nantou City, while the Jiji line continued east into the interior. The Jiji line also boosted initial tourism activities, providing easy access to Sun Moon Lake.

Natural resources extracted along the lines could be transferred to the Western Trunk line at Ershui. The line terminated at its eastern end in a natural basin around Checheng. Agricultural areas along the line began to produce bananas, which were often exported to Japan. Banana exporting peaked in 1930. Other agricultural products included rice, camphor, sugar, and various fruits. The line also facilitated the export of wood from the interior Mount Xiluanda and Mount Danda. This wood was also exported, with a torii at Tokyo's Meiji Shrine being built with wood from Danda. Checheng's forestry sector significantly expanded.

=== Republic of China ===
After the handover of Taiwan from Japan to the Republic of China on 25 October 1945, the present day area of Nantou County was administered under Taichung County of Taiwan Province. Settlements in what became the county were affected by the February 28 incident. On 16 August 1950, a law reorganizing Taiwan Province was passed by the Executive Yuan. Nantou County was established by its separation from Taichung County, and Nantou Township was designed as the county seat. The Nantou County Government was created on 21 October, with the first elections taking place the next year. Taichung continued to provide Prosecutors Office service, although this office opened a branch in Nantou County in 1982. An independent Nantou Prosecutors Office was only set up on 1 July 1994.

On 1 July 1957, the Zhongxing New Village in Nantou Township was designated as the capital of Taiwan Province, replacing the former capital Taipei. It remained the capital until the province was reorganized in 1997. Construction of Zhongxing New Village began in 1956, and it was intended to be a model of Chinese rule and represent a vision for the future. The location was chosen both for its centrality and for its relatively security from invasion, although it was a second choice after a location in Taichung County. The move of the government occurred before the new site was ready, leading many departments needing to find temporary accommodation. Many employees were unhappy with the move, as the new Nantou County location was seen as quiet and remote. The remoteness also created logistical issues, including there not being enough food to feed all the newly translocated government employees. In 1981, the county seat was upgraded from Nantou Township to Nantou City.

Under the Republic of China, some areas assigned to the Thao by Japanese authorities were retaken by the state. Indigenous people were assigned reserves; however, these sometimes overlapped with otherwise restricted areas. For example, 758 hectares (1,870 acres) of the 1,169 hectares (2,890 acres) within Xinyi fell within the Yushan National Park. One Bunun village that fell within Yushan National Park had its traditional graves extracted to enhance the park. A land registration program in 1964 favored Chinese settlers, and many Thao who either did not know they needed to register or could not afford to ended up as tenants on state land. Other Thao land was appropriated for tourism purposes. A ring road built around Sun Moon Lake in 1969 increased immigration and tourism. The Sun Moon Lake area was declared protected in 1970; however, this policy did not provide land to the Thao people.

In 1960 Sun Hai founded a logging company in Checheng, which quickly expanded and revitalized the town. However, the government banned logging in 1985. While the industry attempted to shift to processing imported wood, the forestry sector declined.

In the 1970s road transport improvements included the opening of Provincial Highway 16. Rail transport decreased. The Jiji line was considered for closure in 1986, however it was reopened as a tourist railway. Tourism proved a success, and in the 1990s the line saw 1,000 tourists every weekend. Railway tourists brought a new economic lease of life to the declining towns along the railway.

The new authorities built more tourism sites at Sun Moon Lake, and in 1992, declared it a special 1,974 hectares (4,880 acres) development area. While the pottery industry had declined with the arrival of plastic products, some kilns, such as the Shuili Snake Kiln were recontextualized as educational and entertainment facilities.

After the provincial government of Taiwan Province was removed due to streamlining, Zhongxing New Village began to decay, although it remains the official administrative center.

The 1999 Jiji earthquake struck the region at 1:47am on 21 September. Measuring 7.3 on the Richter scale, it caused substantial damage to infrastructure and loss of life. 136 schools were rebuilt. The Thao community organized to assist in reconstruction, and also pushed for reconstruction to be done in a way that restored their culture. In 2001, the Thao people were recognized as Taiwan's 10th indigenous group.

Following the earthquake, the area around Sun Moon Lake was reorganized under the Tourism Bureau, with the Sun Moon Lake National Scenic Area created on 24 January 2000. This new body was tasked with both reconstruction and expanding tourism to the area.

In 2001, Typhoon Toraji brought 650 millimetres (26 in) of rainfall, causing landslides and flooding.

== Geography ==
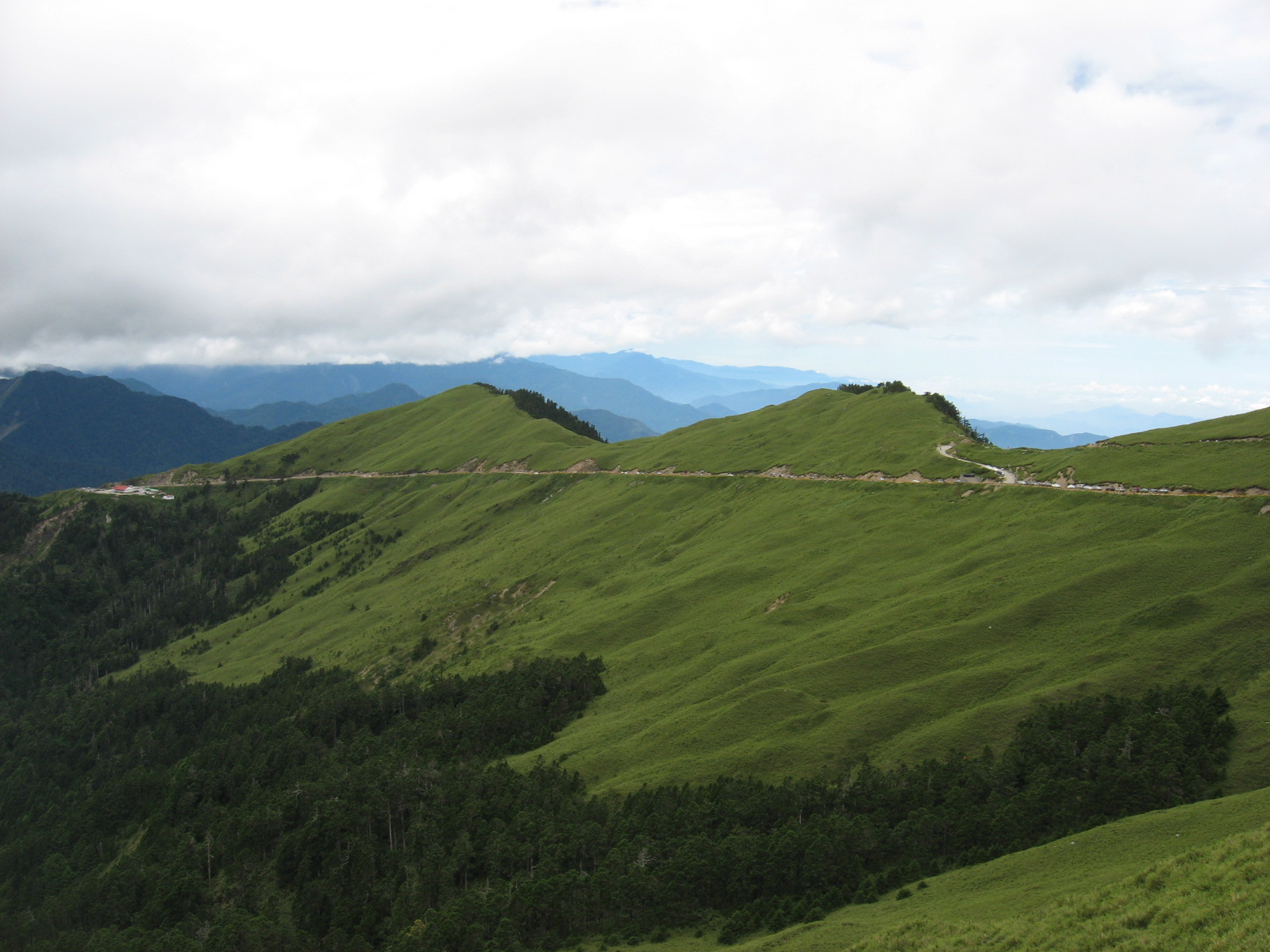
Hehuanshan is one of the higher mountains in Nantou County.

Nantou County has an area of 4,106.436 km^{2} (1,585.504 sq mi) with a width of 72 km (45 mi) and length of 95 km (59 mi). It is the second largest county in Taiwan after Hualien County. Located at the middle of the island, its borders are about 25 kilometres (16 mi) from the eastern and western coasts and 100 kilometres (62 mi) from the north and south of the island. The geographic center of Taiwan is on Mount Hutou, in the Puli township. It is the only landlocked county in Taiwan, bordering Taichung County on its north, Hualien County to the east, Chiayi County and Kaohsiung to the south, and Changhua County and Yunlin County to the west. Many of these borders follow natural features. The western border lies on the Bagua Plateau, while the eastern border lies along the Central Mountain Range. The north and south borders also follow watersheds.

There are 41 mountains taller than 3,000 metres (9,800 ft). The tallest is Yu shan in Xinyi Township, the highest peak in Taiwan with a height of 3,952 metres (12,966 ft). Around 83% of Nantou County area is covered by hills and mountains. Large areas of forest and wilderness remain in the mountains. Between some of the mountains lie the Puli Basins. These basins, while limited by surrounding mountains, are large areas of flat terrain that is conducive to agriculture.

The two major water sources are the Dadu River and Zhuoshui River. The Zhuoshui River is the longest in Taiwan. Named for its murky water, it originates from Hehuanshan in the Central Mountain Range, flowing 186 kilometres (116 mi) west. Also in the county is Sun Moon Lake, the island's largest lake. Other inland waterbodies include Wushe Reservoir, Liyu Lake, and Cilin Lake.

The mountains have created different environments of different soil types, while also reducing the impact of rainfall coming from the Pacific.

70% of Taiwan's mammal species are found in the county, as are 81% of its amphibians. The Taiwan Biodiversity Research Institute is located in Jiji, serving as an educational facility and wildlife sanctuary. The sanctuary treats injured wildlife, notably the endangered Taiwanese pangolin and leopard cat. Other species include sparrows, swifts, black-faced spoonbills, collared scops owls, masked palm civets, Formosan ferret-badgers, crested goshawks, and black-crowned night herons. Puli was once a famous butterfly collection spot. The subspecies Papilio machaon sylvina present on the island may have become extinct due to the 1999 Jiji earthquake.

=== Climate ===
The mountainous geography of the county has created multiple climatic zones. The annual average temperature is 23 °C (73 °F) on level ground and 20 °C (68 °F) on mountains. The annual average rainfall is less than 1,750 mm (68.9 in) in non-mountainous areas and 2,800 mm (110.2 in) in mountainous areas. The rainy season lasts from April to September and the dry season lasts from October to March. Historically water shortages have occurred in the spring and autumn, similar to the Chiayi–Tainan Plain. In 1925, Puli went 151 days without rain.

== Government ==
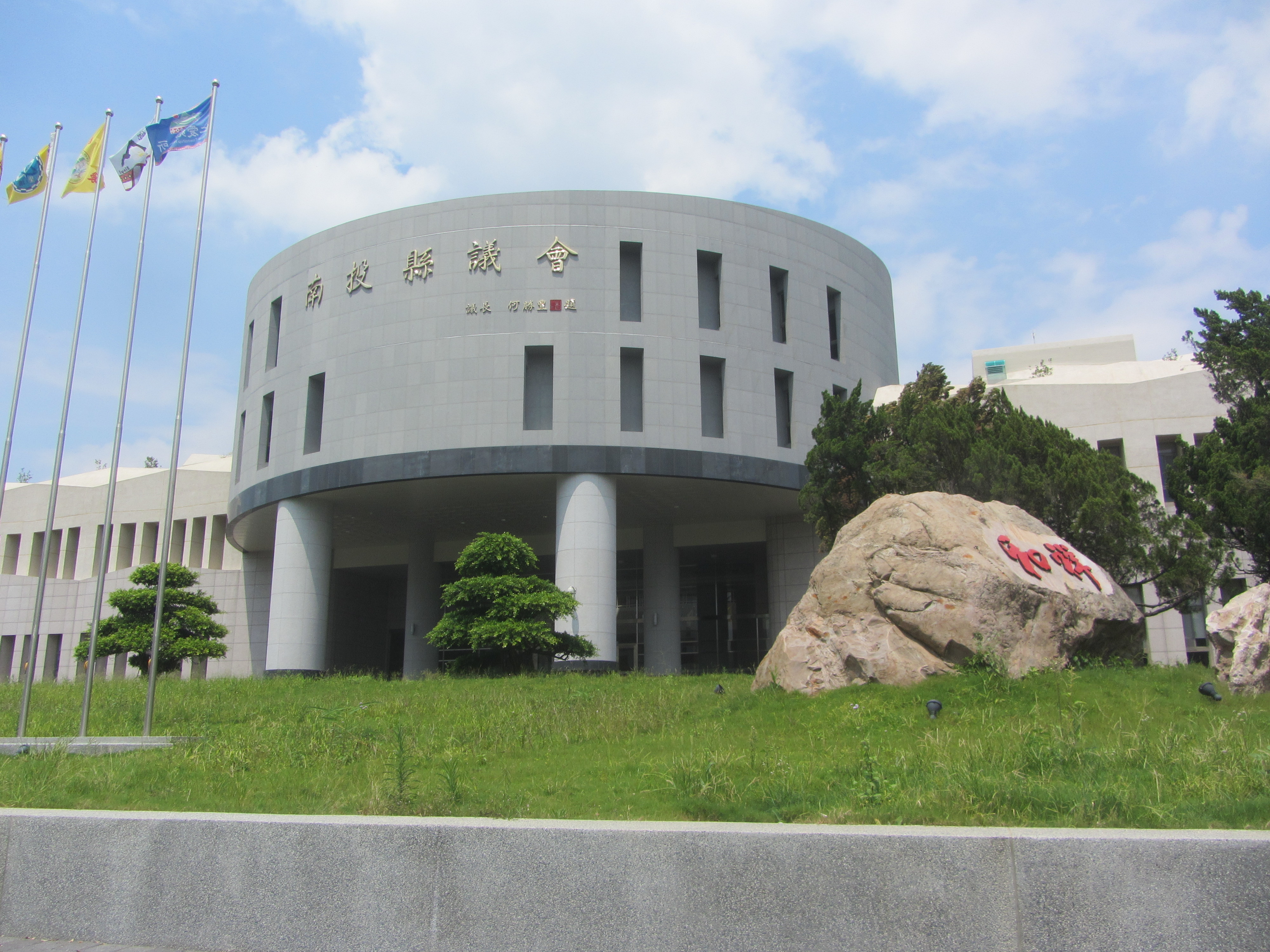
Nantou County Council

Nantou City is the seat of the county. Executive authority is exercised by the Nantou County Government, which has 15 departments. The Nantou County Council is made up of 37 councilors.

Local government is led by the Magistrate of Nantou County, who is elected and limited to two four-year terms. Since the position was first filled on 1 June 1951, the majority of its officeholders have been members of the Kuomintang party. The incumbent is Hsu Shu-hua of the Kuomintang.

=== Administrative divisions ===
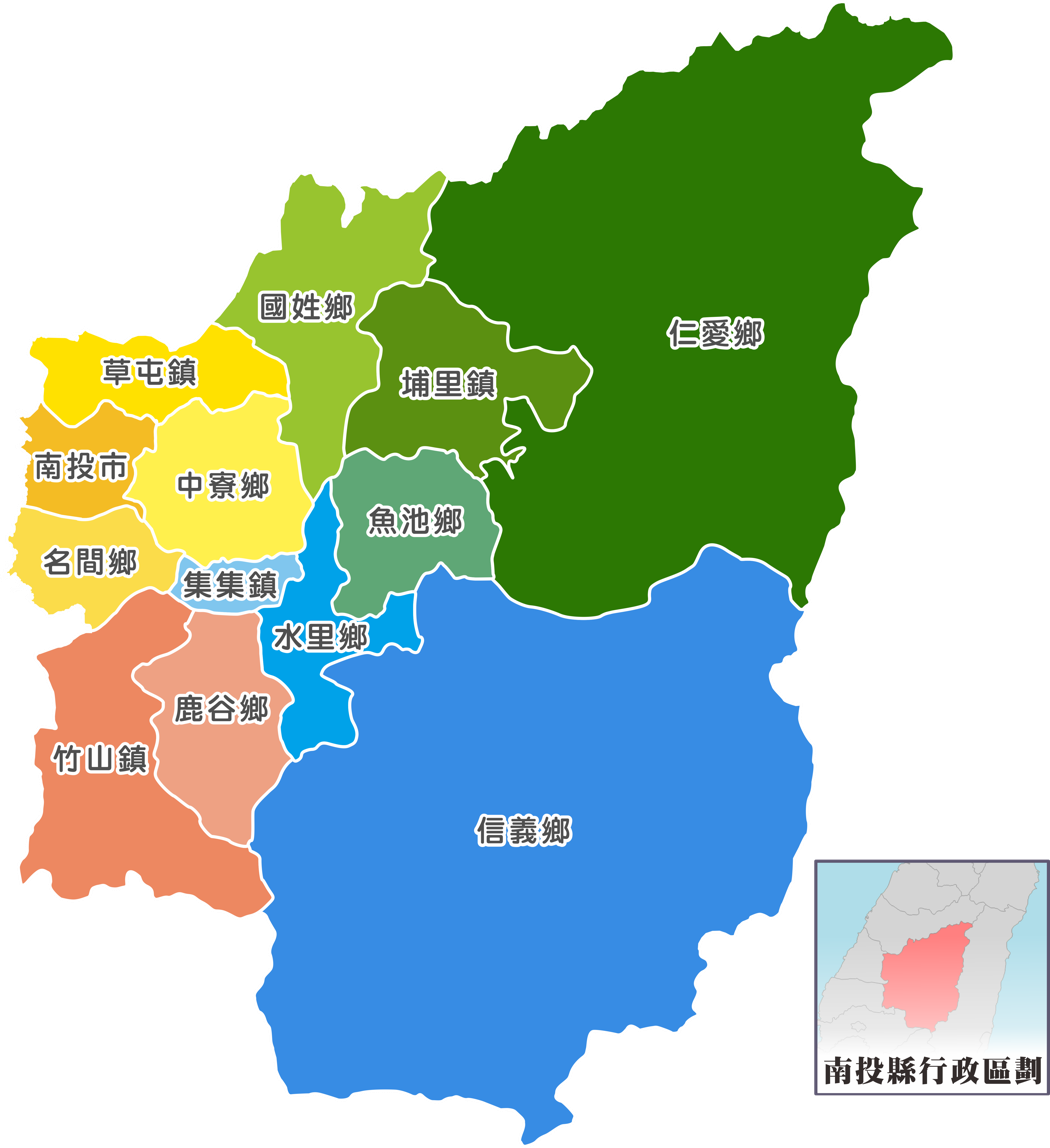
Nantou County Administrative Divisions

Nantou County consists of 1 city, 4 urban townships, 6 rural townships, 2 mountain indigenous townships, 128 villages and 133 neighborhoods.

Type	Name	Chinese	Taiwanese	Hakka	Formosan
City	Nantou City	南投市	Lâm-tâu	Nàm-thèu	
Urban townships	Caotun	草屯鎮	Chháu-tūn	Chhó-thùn	
Urban townships	Jiji	集集鎮	Chi̍p-chi̍p	Si̍p-si̍p	
Urban townships	Puli	埔里鎮	Po͘-lí	Phû-lî	
Urban townships	Jhushan (Zhushan)	竹山鎮	Tek-san	Tsuk-sân	
Rural townships	Guosing (Guoxing)	國姓鄉	Kok-sèng	Koet-siang	
Rural townships	Lugu	鹿谷鄉	Lo̍k-kok	Lu̍k-kuk	
Rural townships	Mingjian	名間鄉	Bêng-kan	Miàng-kiên	
Rural townships	Shueili (Shuili)	水里鄉	Chúi-lí	Súi-lî	
Rural townships	Yuchih (Yuchi)	魚池鄉	Hî-tî	Ǹg-tshṳ̀	QabizayThao
Rural townships	Jhongliao (Zhongliao)	中寮鄉	Tiong-liâu	Chûng-liàu	
Mountain indigenous townships	Ren-ai (Ren'ai)	仁愛鄉	Jîn-ài	Yìn-oi	Atayal, Bunun, Seediq
Mountain indigenous townships	Sinyi (Xinyi)	信義鄉	Sìn-gī	Sin-ngi	Nehunpu-siangBunun

Colors indicate statutory language status of Hakka and Formosan languages in the respective subdivisions.

=== Politics ===
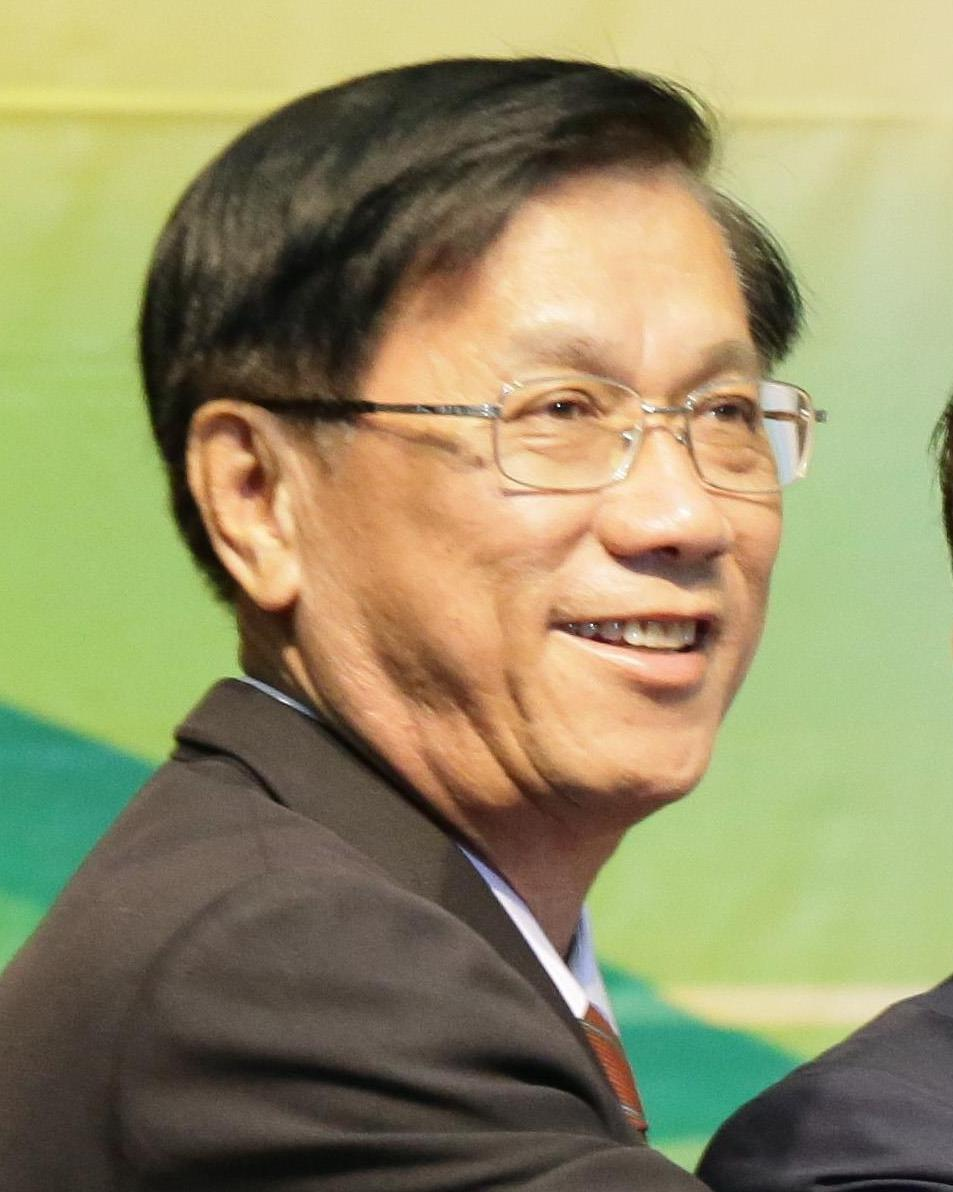
Lin Ming-chen, a former Magistrate of Nantou County

The 2023 Nantou County 2nd Constituency by-election saw the election of a Democratic Progressive Party legislator, rare in the county

Elections in Nantou County for representation in the Legislative Yuan and for county-wide offices are generally won by Kuomintang (KMT) candidates. While there are no county-wide KMT factions, there is internal factional politics at the town and city level.

Nantou County voted for KMT legislators in both of its seats during the 2016 Republic of China legislative election.

The 2023 Nantou County 2nd Constituency by-election saw a Democratic Progressive Party candidate elected by 1,925 votes. However, in the 2024 election the 2nd constituency flipped again, voting in a KMT legislator.

== Demographics ==
Historical population
Year	Pop.	±%
1947	264,780	—
1950	298,165	+12.6%
1955	349,208	+17.1%
1960	412,942	+18.3%
1965	467,526	+13.2%
1970	511,040	+9.3%
1975	517,927	+1.3%
1980	524,245	+1.2%
1985	535,572	+2.2%
1990	536,479	+0.2%
1995	546,517	+1.9%
2000	541,537	−0.9%
2005	535,205	−1.2%
2010	526,491	−1.6%
2015	509,490	−3.2%
2020	490,832	−3.7%
2025	467,881	−4.7%
Source: 1. "臺中縣人口統計表 (1947-1948)" (pdf). 臺中縣統計要覽 (Report) (in Chinese (Taiwan)). Vol. 中華民國36-37年(38.11). 臺中縣: 臺中縣政府主計室. November 1949. pp. 18–71.; 2. "南投縣各鄉鎮市現住人口 (1950-1992)" (pdf). 南投縣統計提要(民國39年至81年) (Report) (in Chinese (Taiwan)). Vol. 中華民國39-81年(82.12). 南投縣: 南投縣政府主計室. December 1993. pp. 60–65.; 3. "縣市人口按性別及五齡組(63)" (in Chinese (Taiwan)). 內政部戶政司.

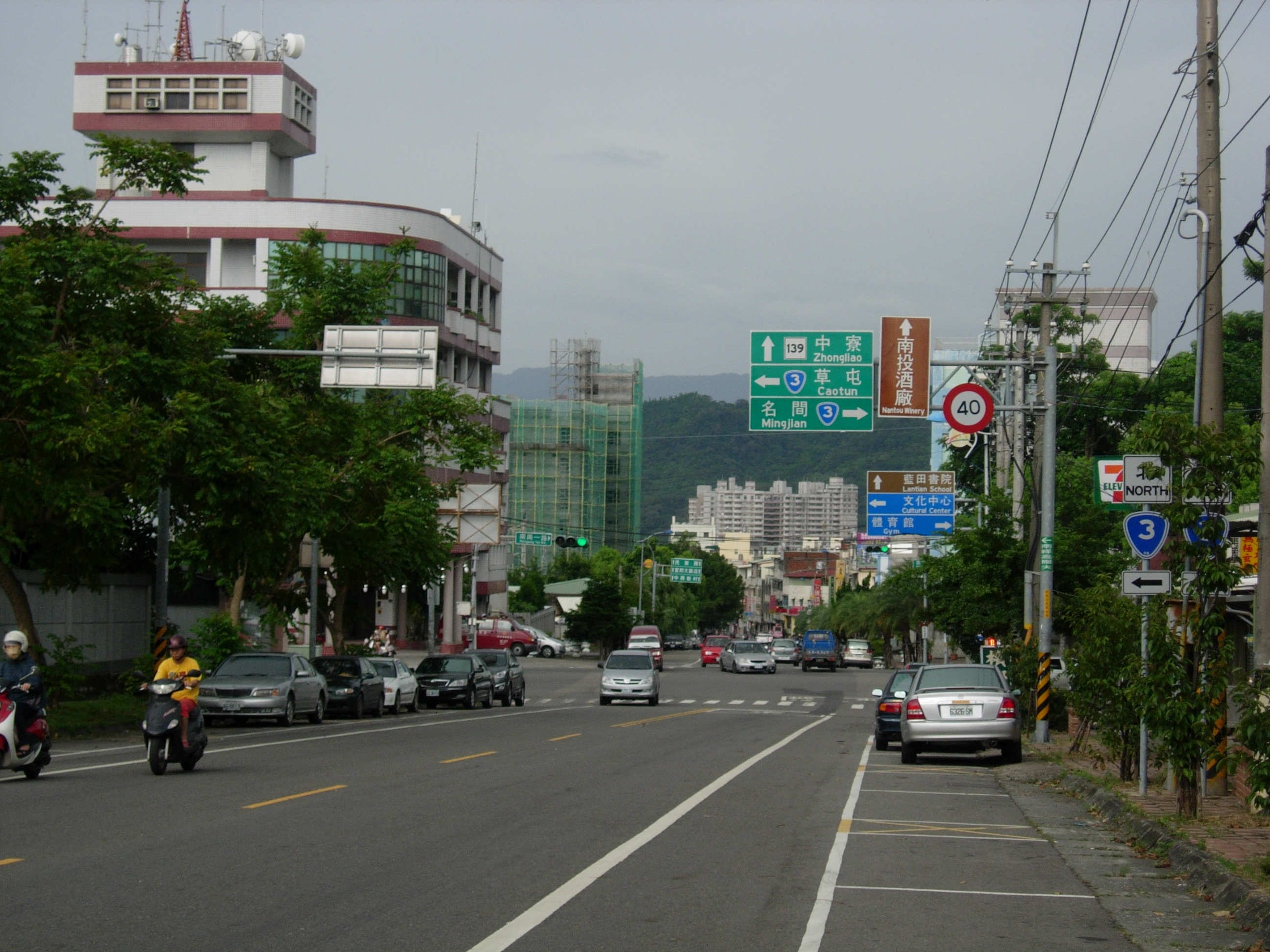
Nantou City, the county seat of Nantou County

The county remains home to a large number of ethnic groups, and includes the traditional lands of a number of Taiwanese indigenous peoples, including the Atayal people, Bunun people, and Seediq people. Altogether there are around 30,000 people registered as indigenous, mostly living in Puli, Ren'ai, Xinyi, and Yuchi.

The largest population of Atayal people is in Ren'ai. Many Bunun people live in Ren'ai and Xinyi. Xinyi also has a distinct Tsou population. The Yuchi and Shuili townships are home to the Thao people. The Thao were recognized as separate from the Tsou only in 2001, and less than 1,000 people are registered as Thao. The Seediq are divided into three dialect groups, the Truku, (Note: The recognized Taroko people is related to this group, however those in Nantou did not support the campaign for a separate identity.) Teuda, and Tkedaya, each with roughly equal populations. These were historically antagonistic groups, up until at least some time during the Japanese period. The Nantou Seediq have a mixed relationship with Seediq in neighboring Hualian County, with views stretching from viewing them as part of the same dialect groups to asserting that they should be viewed as a different ethnic group entirely.

Non-indigenous ethnic groups include the Hoklo people, Hakka people, and Waishengren. Large Hakka communities are found in Caotun, Guoxing, Nantou City, Puli, and Shuili.

There are around 500 registered surnames in the county.

=== Population ===
Nantou County has a population of 471,647 people as of February 2025. Of these, 11,948 were recent immigrants.

- The following information is as of January 2023 資料

City Name	acreage (km²)	下轄村 里數	下轄 鄰數	Population	人口 消長	The population density (人/km²)	Postcode	Geographical division
Nantou City	71.6021	34	753	97,403	+42	1,386	540	烏溪
Puli	162.2227	33	569	77,340	+96	490	545	烏溪
Caotun	104.0327	27	608	96,778	+132	939	542	烏溪
Jhushan (Zhushan)	247.3339	28	482	51,840	-1	217	557	濁水溪
Jiji	49.7268	11	126	10,073	+5	212	552	濁水溪
Mingjian	83.0955	23	372	36,212	-22	454	551	濁水溪
Lugu	141.8981	13	174	16,457	-20	122	558	濁水溪
Jhongliao (Zhongliao)	146.6541	18	258	13,819	-22	98	541	烏溪
Yuchih (Yuchi)	121.3735	13	191	14,900	+8	128	555	烏溪
Guosing (Guoxing)	175.7042	13	159	17,224	-32	103	544	烏溪
Shuili	106.8424	19	209	16,359	-28	161	553	濁水溪
Sinyi (Xinyi)	1,422.4188	15	121	15,573	-19	11	556	濁水溪
Ren-ai (Ren'ai)	1,273.5312	16	192	15,688	-24	12	546	烏溪
Nantou County	4,106.4360	263	4,214	479,666	+71	120		

- The population growth and decline is calculated by subtracting the population of the previous month from the current month's population. Negative values are represented by red letters, positive values are represented by blue letters, and no growth is represented by green letters.
- The population density of each district is calculated by rounding 4 to 5 to 1 decimal place
- Population growth：
  - 高度成長 High growth （年成長率高於1%） ：NA（updated 2020）
  - 穩定成長 Steady growth （年成長率0.1%~1%） ：Caotun
  - 成長停滯 Stagnant growth（年成長率±0.1%） ：NA（updated 2020）
  - 輕度流失 Mild decline （年成長率-0.5%~-0.1%）：Nantou, Ren'ai
  - 中度流失 Moderate decline（年成長率-1%~-0.5%） ：Puli, Mingjian, Yuchi
  - 高度流失 High decline （年成長率-2%~-1%） ：Lugu, Zhushan, Zhongliao, Xinyi, Shuili, Jiji
  - 嚴重流失 Severe decline （年成長率低於-2%） ：Guoxing
View source data.

=== Language ===
The official language of the county is Mandarin. Taiwanese Hokkien, Hakka, English and aboriginal languages are also spoken. The county is the only place where the Thao language is spoken. Other aboriginal languages include Atayal, Bunun, and Tsou. The Nantou Hakka Cultural Academy promotes the Hakka Chinese language.

== Economy ==
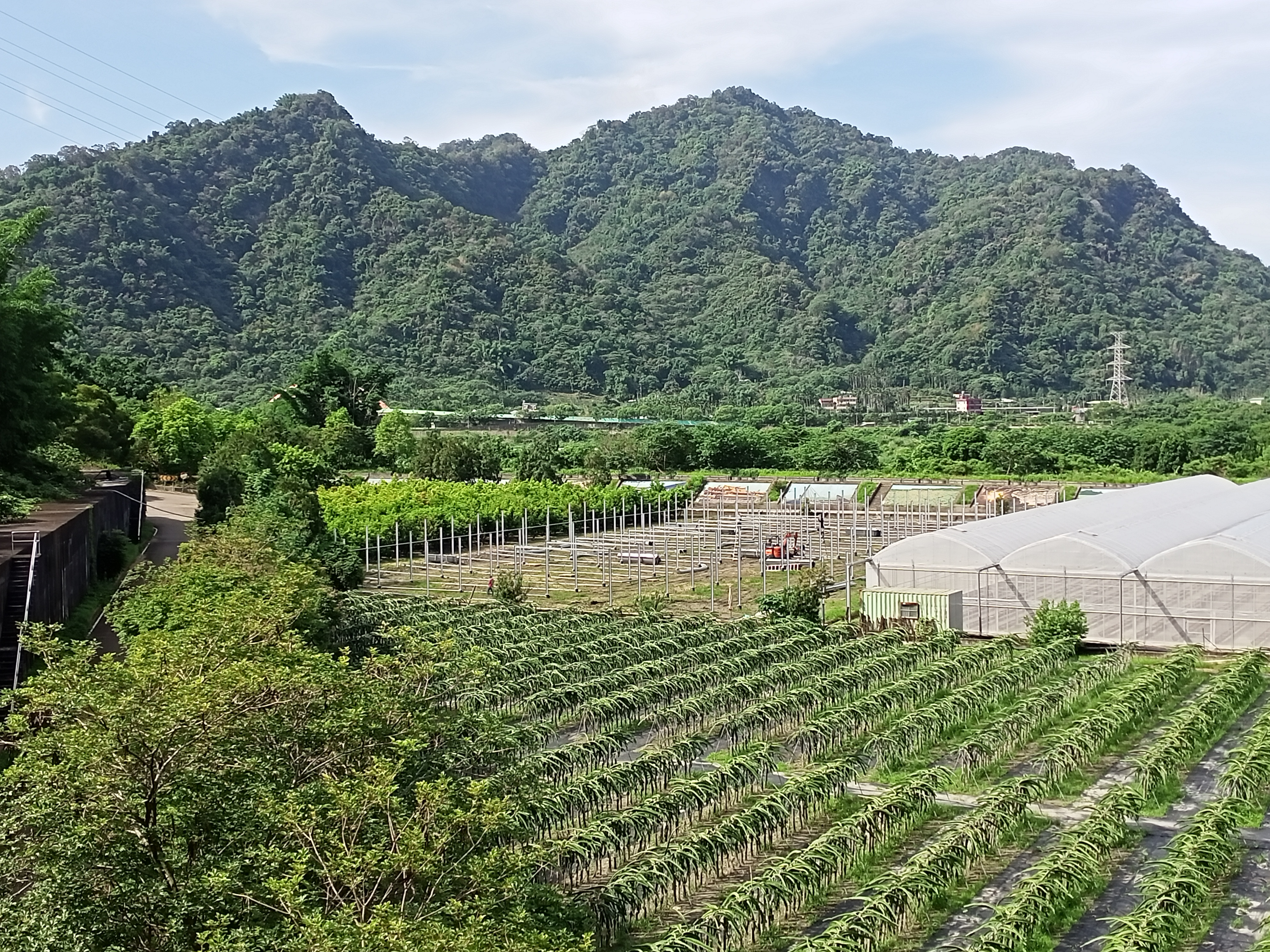
Agriculture in Nantou County

Due to its landlocked nature, the county's economy depends mainly on agriculture. Other important industries in the county include forestry, fishery, and animal husbandry. Tourism and manufacturing are also important.

As of 2016, there are 28,000 registered businesses and 5,205 registered companies in the county with a total capital of NT$5,609 million and NT$80,024 million respectively. There are 938 factories operating in the county as of 2015.

Many areas along the Jiji line are still agricultural. While banana production has decreased from historical levels, other crops include dragon fruit and oranges.‍ The Jiji line has also proved a significant tourism draw, going through picturesque countryside. A railway museum has been opened at its terminus. Assam tea is cultivated around Sun Moon Lake. This tea was first introduced the area by the Japanese. Also grown around the lake are mushrooms and orchids. Plums are grown in Shuili, which also serve as a tourist attraction when they blossom in December. The plums are processed into various products, including dry fruit, vinegar, and wine. Dong Ding tea is cultivated in Lugu. A unique variation, Gui Fei Oolong, was developed after the 1999 Jiji earthquake. It is created from tea leaves that secrete honey-flavored defences against Jacobiasca formosana insects.

Sun Moon Lake also supports a small fishery, holding sharpbelly and predatory carp. Sharpbelly are a traditional part of the Thao diet. As the fish are small, it is common to salt or deep fry them. Predatory carp are larger, reaching 30 centimetres (12 in). They became known as "President's Fish" as Chiang Kai-shek was known to eat them whenever visiting the lake.

The Nantou government has sought to encourage international as well as domestic tourism. It has also sought to develop industrial parks in Zhongxing New Village, and is developing similar industrial parks elsewhere. Events held by the government include a lantern festival, a Coffee and Chocolate Festival, a tea expo, and the Sun Moon Lake Swimming Carnival. Huhuanshan was certified as a Dark-sky preserve by DarkSky International in 2019, the first Dark-sky preserve in Taiwan. A tourist shuttle bus network connects many key points within the county. Old logging buildings in Checheng have been preserved for tourists. The Formosan Aboriginal Culture Village is a joint amusement park and education center for all the Taiwanese indigenous peoples.

=== Tourist attractions ===
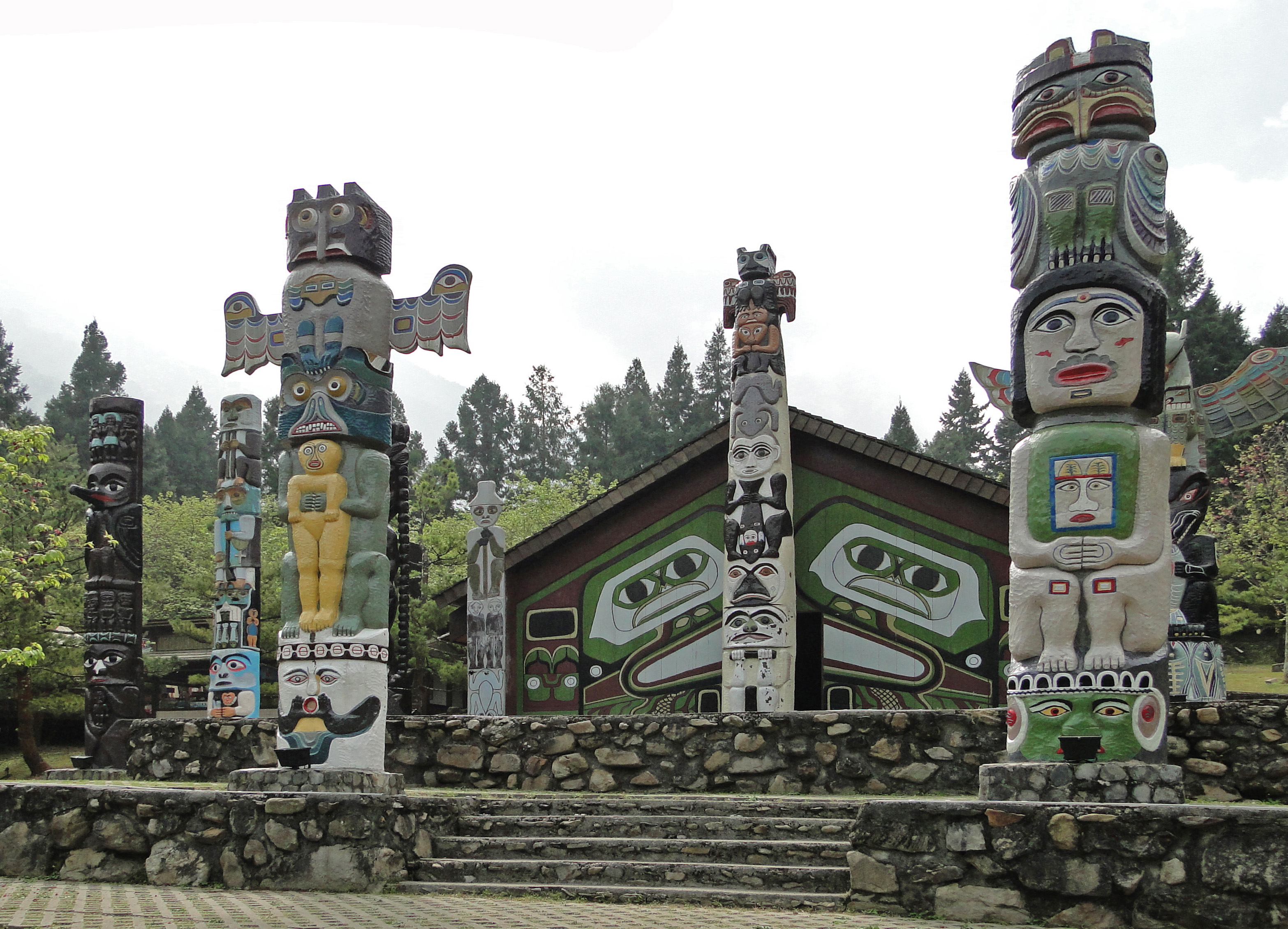
Formosan Aboriginal Culture Village

- Chung Tai Chan Monastery
- Ci En Pagoda
- Paper Dome
- Fonghuanggu Bird and Ecology Park
- Formosan Aboriginal Culture Village
- Geographic center of Taiwan
- Jufang Hall
- Lalu Island
- Ming Shan Resort
- Nantou County Culture Park
- Qingjing Farm
- Shanlinxi Forest Recreation Area
- Shuili Snake Kiln Ceramics Cultural Park
- Shuiyuan Suspension Bridge
- Sun Moon Lake
- Sun Moon Lake Wen Wu Temple
- Taroko National Park
- Wushe Incident Memorial Park
- Xitou Nature Education Area
- Xuanzang Temple
- Yushan National Park
- Zhushan Zinan Temple

== Education ==
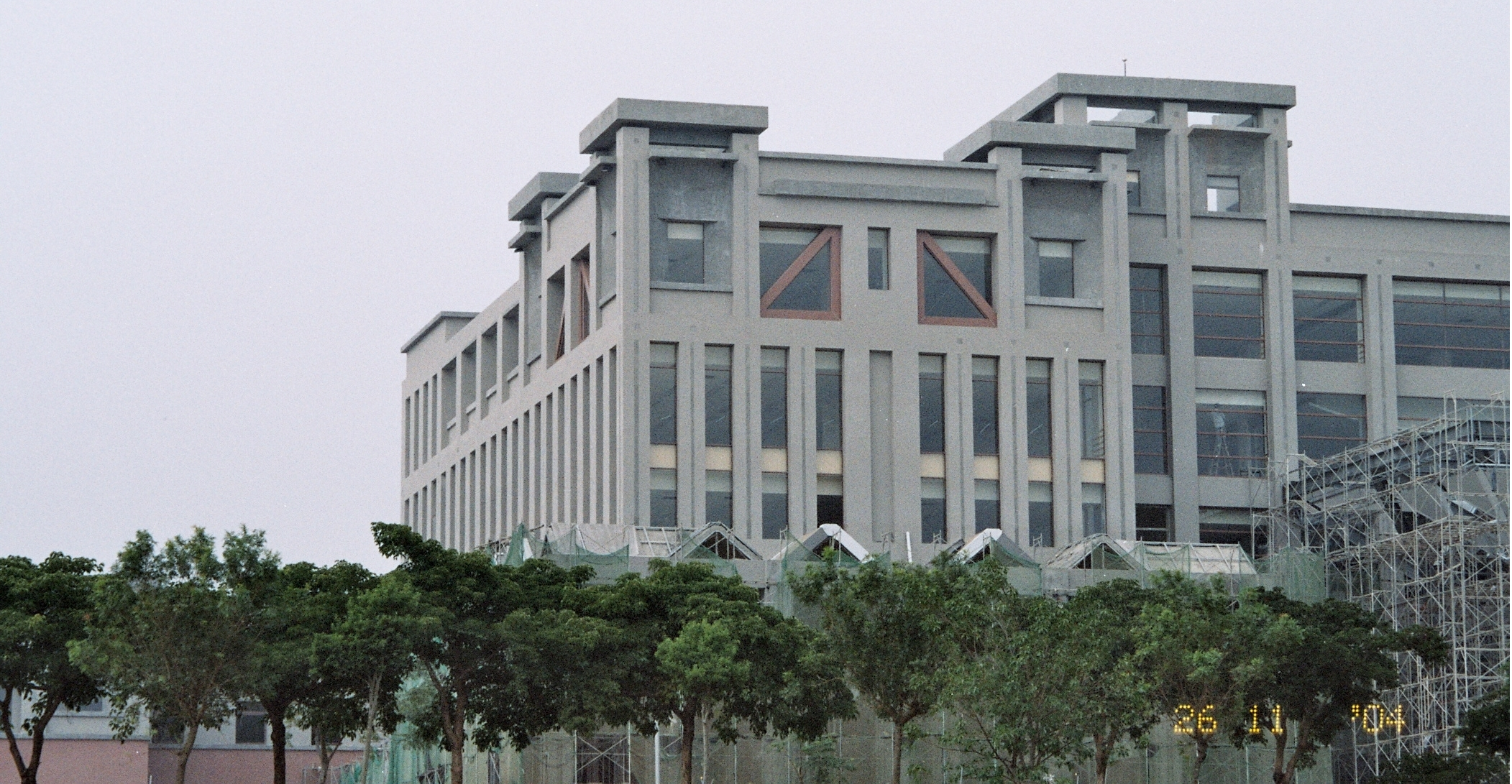
National Chi Nan University

As of 2007, there were 2 colleges, 13 senior high and vocational schools, 30 junior high schools, 149 elementary schools, 106 kindergartens, and 84 day care centers in the county. This changed to 2 colleges, 15 high schools, 23 junior high school schools, 139 elementary schools, and 180 kindergartens in January 2024. In preschools linked to elementary schools, there is a student-teacher ratio of 12:1. Since 2005, students from third grade up are required to take at least on English class each week. The county operates one community college, distributed through 10 branches. Notable universities in the county are National Chi Nan University, National Chung Hsing University and Nan Kai University of Technology.

An Indigenous Community College has been established by the government to help create locally-generated curriculumns that reflect traditional cultures.

== Energy ==
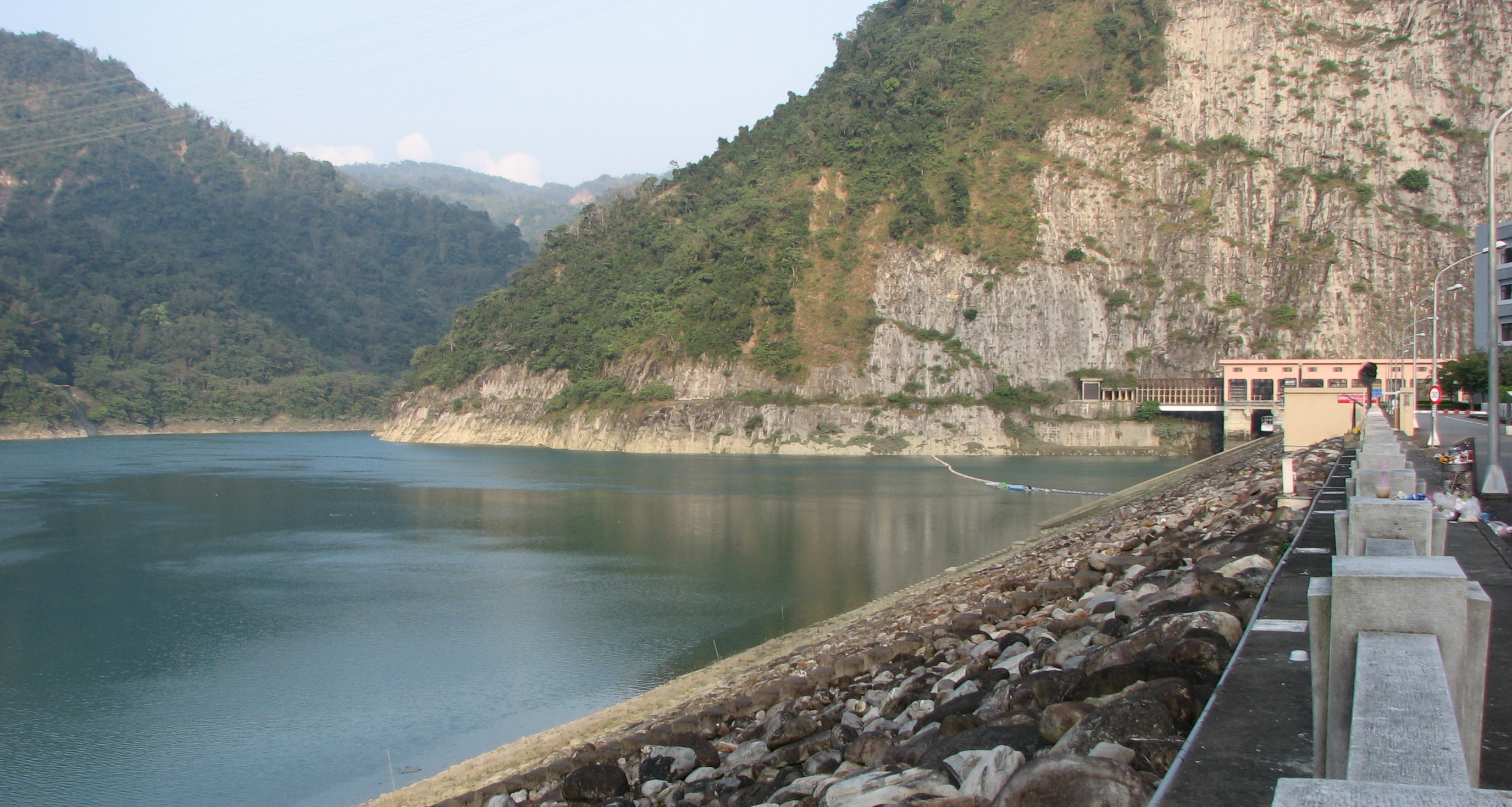
Mingtan Pumped Storage Hydro Power Plant

Nantou County houses Taiwan's first pumped-storage hydroelectric power plant, the Takuan Pumped Storage Hydro Power Plant commissioned in 1985 with an installed capacity of 1,008 MW. It also houses Taiwan's largest pumped-storage hydroelectric power plant, the Mingtan Pumped Storage Hydro Power Plant with an installed capacity of 1,602 MW. Both power plants are located in Shuili Township along the Shuili River.

Both the Dadu River and Zhuoshui River have reservoirs used to generate hydroelectric power. The Shuili River supports three power plants.

== Culture ==
The Taiwanese indigenous peoples in the county retain many distinct customs. In many cases these are retained from previous homelands, following migration to the Puli basin in the 19th century.

Different Plains Indigenous peoples with communities in the Puli basin have different ceremonies as part of ancestor worship. The Papora people hold an annual ancestor worship ceremony at the start of the seventh month in the lunar calendar, called the "Alomai". This ceremony has never been open to those outside of the community. The Taokas people hold the "Chian Tien" ritual from the 15th day of the seventh month to the 15th day of the eighth month. For this, three large flags are created. On the final day, the flags are each assigned their own flag bearer and two guards for a ritual march, and a flag falling indicates misfortune. The Babuza people similarly celebrate "Chian Tien", but within their households rather than on a community basis. Arikun and Lloa communities celebrate on the 20th day of the seventh month. Their rituals take place in front of a sacred Bischofia javanica tree.

The Pazeh and Kaxabu communities celebrate "Azem" on the 15th day of the 11th month.

However, many groups share a common practice of offering rice cakes as part of ancestor worship, although different names are used by each group.

There are a number of registered historical sites in the county, including Lantian Academy, Mingxin Academy, Dengying Academy, Linfongshih Tomb, Nuomi Bridge, the Yidu Stele, Dunlun Hall, the Cyubing remains, Longde Temple, the Manshe School ruins, and Jingsheng Pavilion.

== Sports ==
Notable sporting events held by Nantou County include:

- 2003 Asian Canoe Slalom Championships
- 2011 Asian Women's Softball Championship
- 2013 Asian Canoe Slalom Championships
- 2023 and 2025 U-15 Women Softball Asia Cup

== Transportation ==
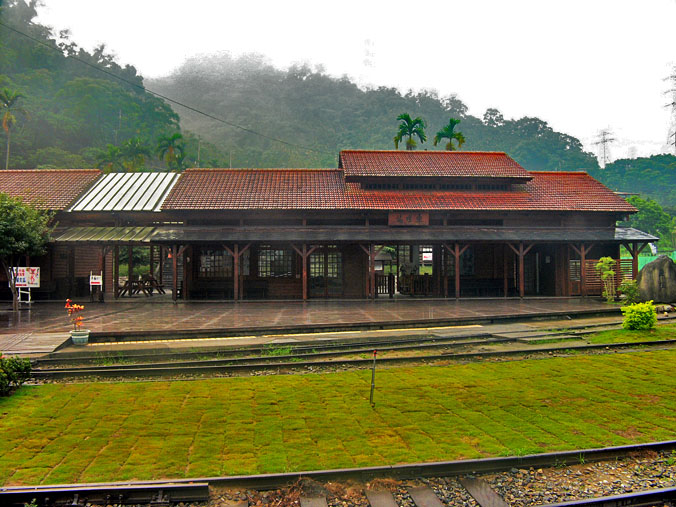
Checheng Station

National Freeway 3 and National Freeway 6 connect the county to other parts of the country. Provincial Highway 16 is built within the county.

Taichung International Airport and the Port of Taichung are within half an hour of the county.

=== Rail ===
Nantou County is served by the Jiji line of Taiwan Railway, the longest branch line in Taiwan. It consists of Tianzhong railway station, Ershui railway station, Zhuoshui railway station, Longquan railway station, Jiji railway station, Shuili railway station, and Checheng railway station. The Jiji line connects Nantou County to the Taiwan High Speed Rail line, as its western terminus at Tianzhong station is connected by express bus to Changhua HSR station. There are plans to directly connect the Jiji line to Changhua HSR station. It has also been proposed to extend the Taichung MRT to Zhongxing New Village in Nantou County.

== Notable people ==
- Feng-Ying Chang, Seediq weaver

== See also ==
- Administrative divisions of Taiwan
