= Shuili Snake Kiln Ceramics Cultural Park =

Kiln in Shuili, Nantou County, Taiwan

Shuili Snake Kiln Ceramics Cultural Park 水里蛇窯陶藝文化園區
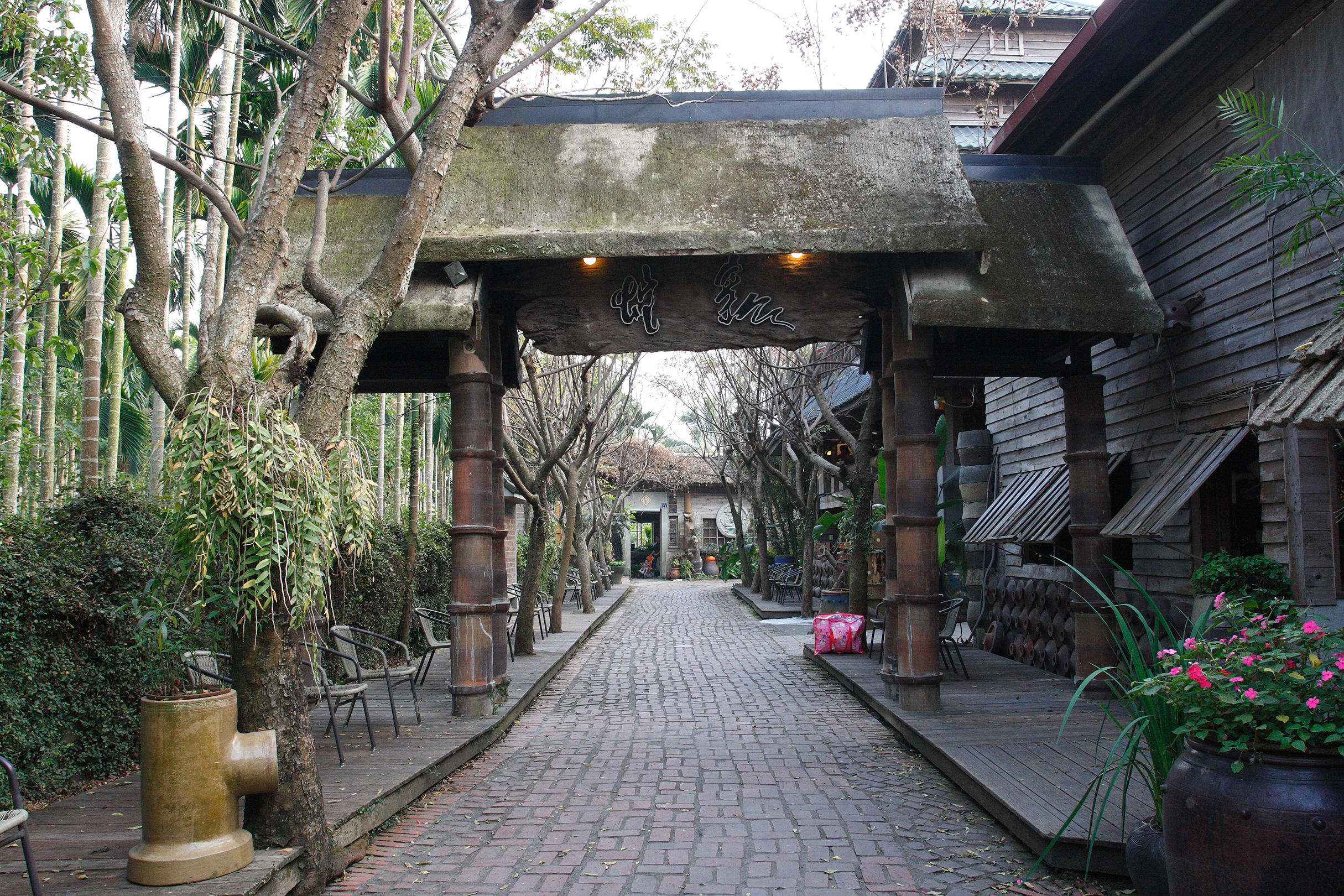
- Built: 1927
- Location: Shuili, Nantou County, Taiwan
- Coordinates: 23°48′04″N 120°51′52″E
- Industry: ceramics

The Shuili Snake Kiln Ceramics Cultural Park (traditional Chinese: 水里蛇窯陶藝文化園區; simplified Chinese: 水里蛇窑陶艺文化园区; pinyin: Shǔilǐ Shé Táocí Wénhuà Yuánqū) is a park in Dingkan Village, Shuili Township, Nantou County, Taiwan, known for its large kiln.

== Name ==
The name Snake came from the long and narrow shape of the kiln, resembling a snake.

== History ==
The kiln was built in 1927 where it used to produce large jars and other ceramics. It was founded by ceramic artist master Jiang Song Lin.

== Architecture ==
The building consists of the culture museum, ceramic classroom and multimedia room.

== See also ==
- List of tourist attractions in Taiwan
