= Puli Basins =

Basin in Nantou County, Taiwan

Coordinates: 23.9512°N 120.9677°E

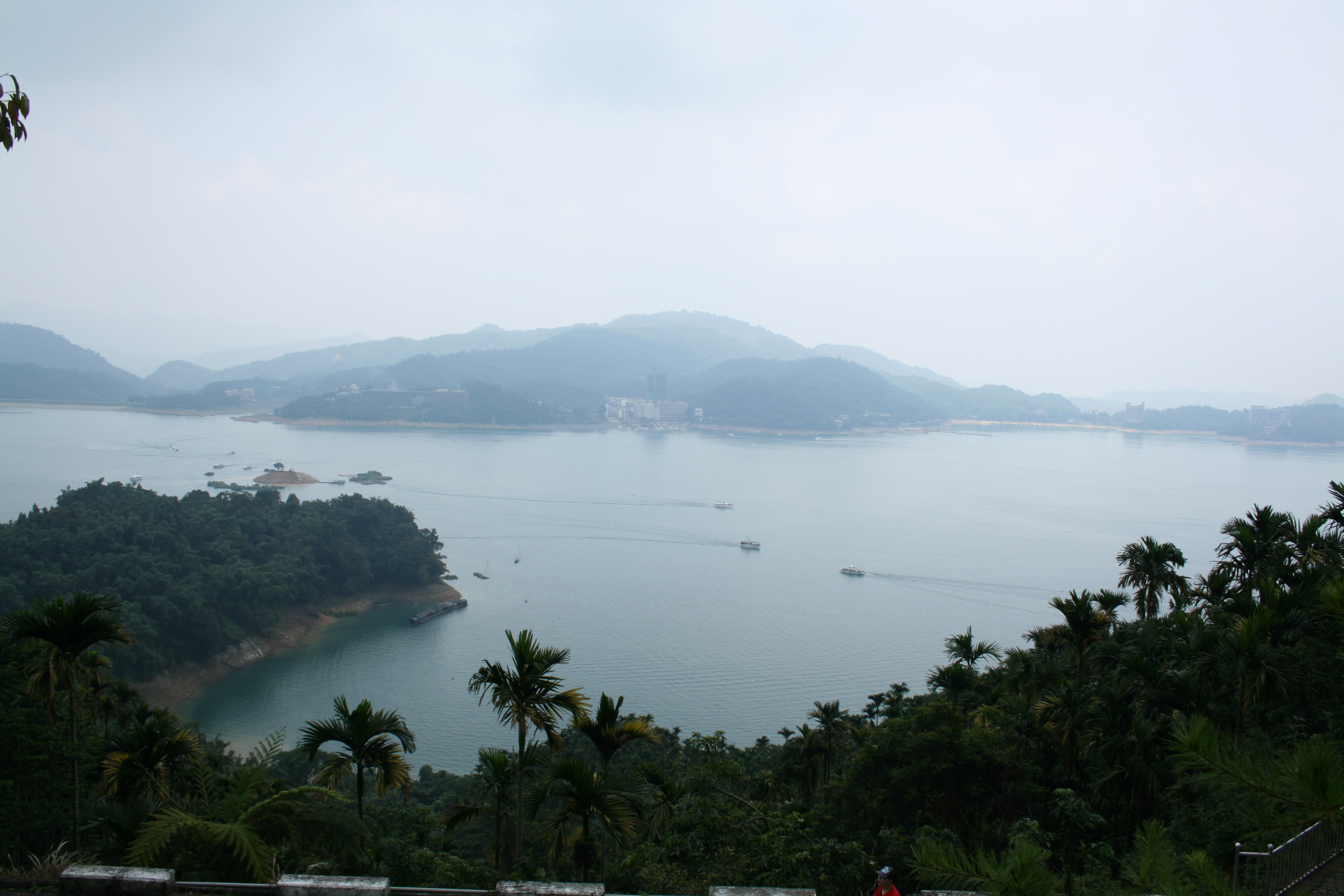
The Sun Moon Lake (Riyuetan) and its surrounding area form one basin of the group of Puli Basins.

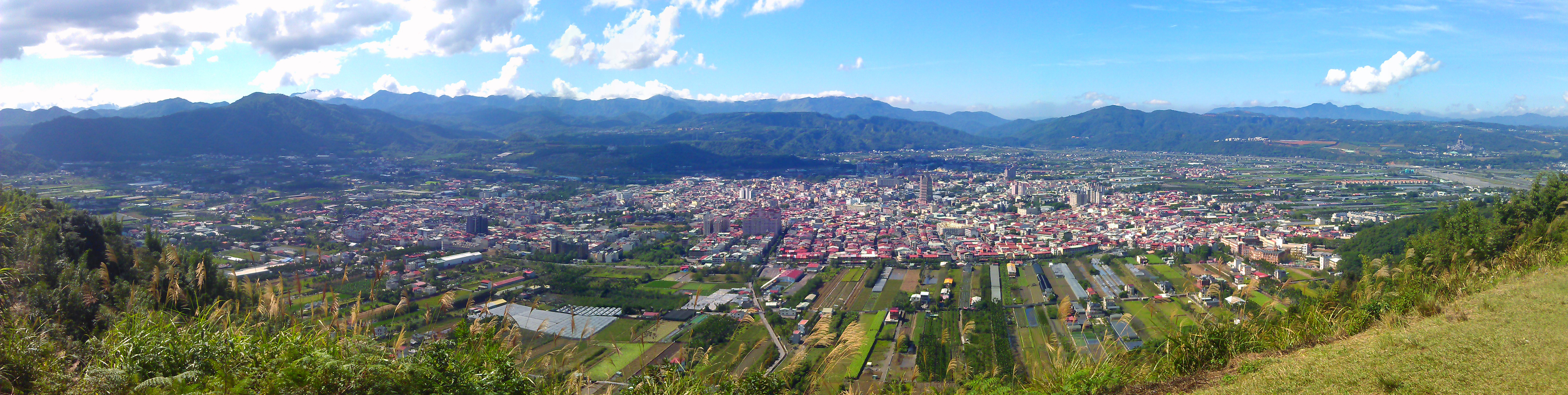
Aerial view of Puli Basin.

The Puli Basins (Chinese: 埔里盆地群; pinyin: Bùlǐ Péndì Qún) are a group of several small basins located across the mountainous area of Nantou in central Taiwan. The group includes the Yuchih Basin (魚池盆地), Jihyuehtan Basin (日月潭盆地), Toushe Basin (頭社盆地), Chungkui Basin (銃櫃盆地), Lienhuachih Basin (蓮華池盆地) and Puli Basin (埔里盆地) proper, the largest of the group. Generally speaking, the singular term "Puli Basin" also refers to the whole group of basins. Tablelands are prominent geomorphic features in the Puli Basin in central Taiwan.
