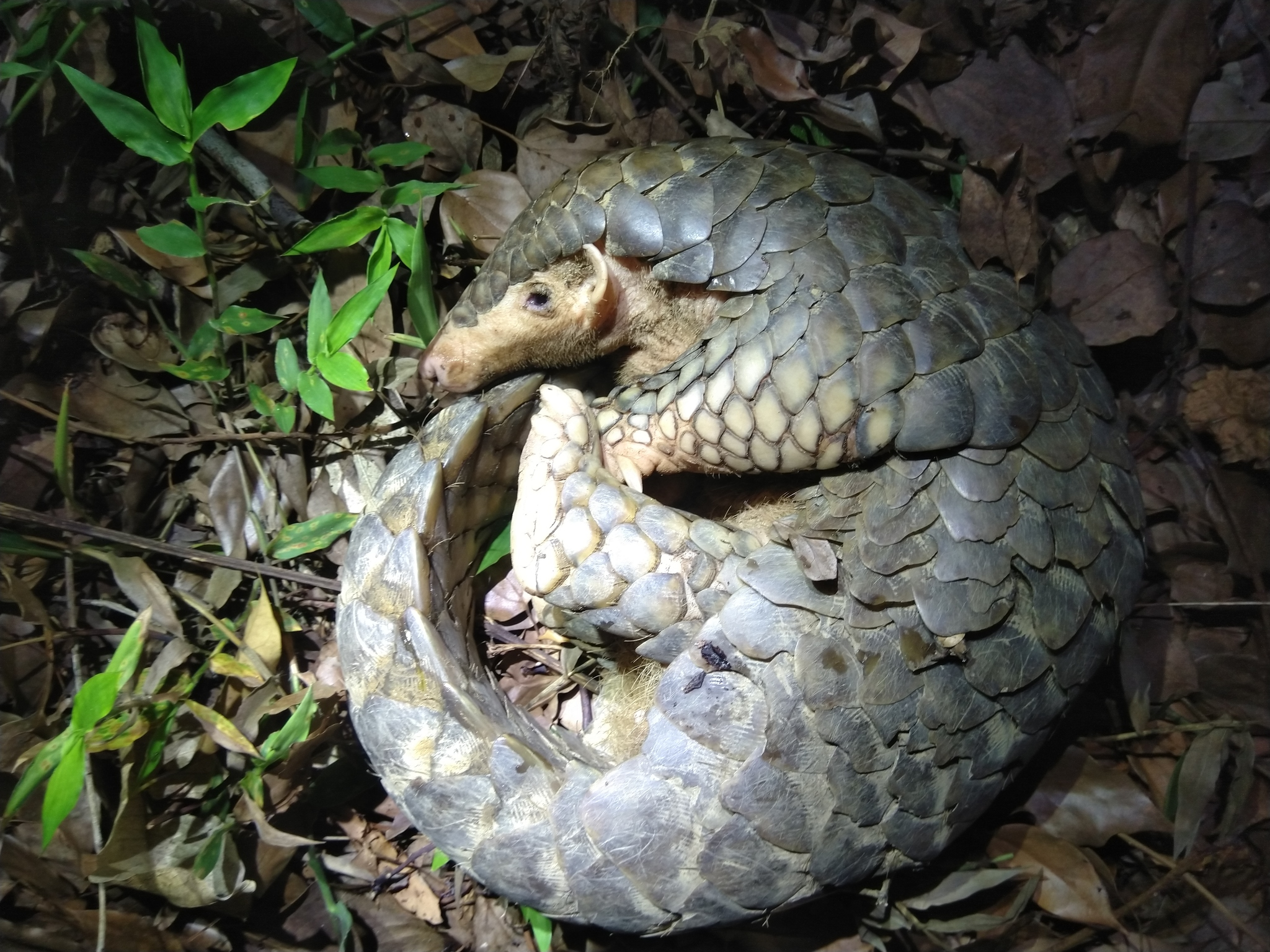

Scientific classification
- Kingdom: Animalia
- Phylum: Chordata
- Class: Mammalia
- Infraclass: Placentalia
- Order: Pholidota
- Family: Manidae
- Genus: Manis
- Species: M. pentadactyla
- Subspecies: M. p. pentadactyla

Trinomial name
- Manis pentadactyla pentadactyla Linnaeus, 1758

Synonyms
- Manis brachyura Erxleben, 1777

= Taiwanese pangolin =

Subspecies of mammal

The Taiwanese pangolin (Manis pentadactyla pentadactyla), also known as the Formosan pangolin, is a subspecies of the Chinese pangolin that is native to Taiwan. Its population has largely declined over the past few decades, mainly due to the threat of poaching and illegal trading of their valuable scales and meat.

== Appearance ==
While they are extremely similar in appearance to armadillos and anteaters, the Taiwanese pangolin, like all pangolins, are genetically more closely related to bears and cats. These mammals look like large rodents of approximately 76 cm (30 inches) long, with brown hard scales covering the entire dorsal side of the body. Its front claws are long and sharp, which allows them to dig into the ground in search of ant and termite nests, as well as to make their own burrows.

== Behavior ==
Taiwanese pangolins are generally solitary, nocturnal animals known to have elusive behavioral patterns. Therefore, sightings of the Taiwanese pangolin in the wild are extremely rare, making it difficult for data to be collected. The small population also contributes to the difficulty of field observations. They are fossorial animals, which means that they dig burrows underground. Most of the daytime is spent in these burrows, which are used for resting, giving birth, or nursing its offspring. These burrows are also known to be reused and shared among other individual pangolins. The powerful forelimbs have adapted to help dig these burrows easily. Not only this, but their digging skills are also used for hunting insects (predominantly ants and termites). The pangolins utilize their sharp long claws to open their preys' nests and stick its long sticky tongue to capture food. Although they are usually on the ground or underground, they are also known to be good climbers as well.

== Habitat ==
The Taiwanese pangolin can be found in a variety of environments in Taiwan, including but not limited to forests, bamboo forests, grasslands, and agricultural fields.

== Threats to population ==
=== Poaching ===
The population of Taiwanese pangolins rapidly decreased due to the high demand in the local medicine and meat markets from 1950 to 1970. Additionally, many Taiwanese pangolins have been exported globally for their leather. While it said to have mostly stopped today, some Taiwanese pangolins are also exported to China, as China is one of the biggest consumers of pangolin–based products. After the government's ban of commercial harvesting of Taiwanese pangolins, a slight increase in the population was observed. However, due to the lack of strict regulations, hunting of pangolins in Taiwan still persisted, only now in the form of poaching and illegal trading. An estimate of more than 2,000 pangolins were sold every year as part of illegal trading in the mid-1980s. It is reported that a significant decline in local consumption was only evident after the Taiwanese government established the Wildlife Conservation Act in 1989.

=== Gin traps ===
Another factor that has led to the downfall of the Taiwanese pangolin population is the use of gin traps. Gin traps were commonly used by farmers in Taiwan for pest control or to hunt small animals. However, as there is no method of controlling its target, pangolins would frequently get caught in these traps. It is said that 50% of the 117 wild Taiwanese pangolins brought to the Endemic Species Research Institute in central Taiwan from 1993 to 2009 were injured due to these gin traps. The sale and use of gin traps in Taiwan were banned in 2011 under the Animal Protection Act and are not a major threat anymore.

== Conservation ==
The Taipei Zoo held two conservation workshops, one in 2004 and one in 2017, in cooperation with the Forestry Bureau, the Council of Agriculture, the Endemic Species Research Institute, and the IUCN SSC Pangolin and Conservation Planning Specialist Groups. These so–named Pangolin Population and Habitat Viability Assessment (PHVA) workshops aimed to solidify conservation strategies and methods of prolonging Taiwanese pangolin survival. In the 2017 PHVA workshop, an elaborate 10–year plan named "the 2017–2027 National Conservation Strategy and Action Plan" was developed in order to achieve their goal of increasing the pangolin population. This plan involved more than 70 stakeholders from 13 different countries and consists of five main components: status review, vision statement, goals, objectives, and actions. In short, through these five parts, the group of conservationists aim to assess current knowledge on the Taiwanese pangolin, define clear short– and long–term goals for conservation, and finally work toward the goals with specific activities such as protection and breeding of the Taiwanese pangolin.
