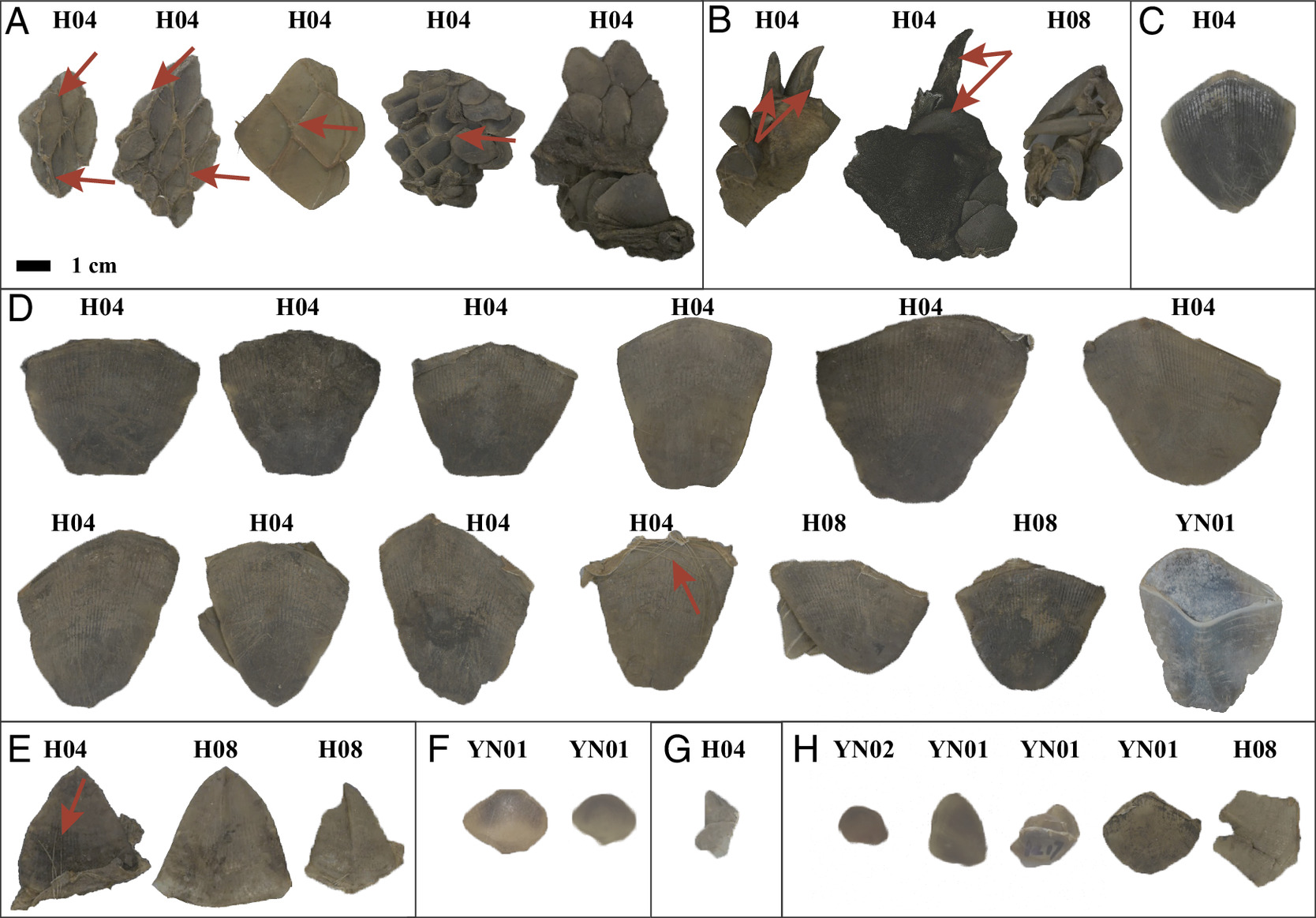
- Known scales belonging to M. mysteria

Scientific classification
- Kingdom: Animalia
- Phylum: Chordata
- Class: Mammalia
- Order: Pholidota
- Family: Manidae
- Genus: Manis
- Species: M. mysteria

Binomial name
- Manis mysteria Gu et al., 2023

= Manis mysteria =

Manis mysteria Temporal range: 5–0 Ma

Species of mammal

Manis mysteria, the cryptic pangolin, is a pangolin in the family Manidae that is native to an unknown location within Asia. It is only known from partial specimens and the species has never been observed alive.

== Discovery and naming ==
Manis mysteria is known from twenty-seven scales confiscated in 2012 and 2013 in Hong Kong, and a further six scales confiscated during 2015 and 2019 in Yunnan, China.

The scales were first identified as belonging to a new pangolin species by Zhang (2015), who identified a genotype lineage which could not be identified as belonging to any of the Asian pangolin species known at the time.

In 2023, Gu Tong-Tong (Yunnan University School of Life Science) described the scales and assigned them to a new species named Manis mysteria.

== Distribution and habitat ==
Because Manis mysteria is only known from confiscated scales, its distribution across Asia remains unknown until live specimens are found.

== Conservation ==
It is probably critically endangered because the species has a low genetic diversity and high levels of inbreeding.

Manis mysteria, much like every other species of pangolin, is considered critically endangered due to how sought after they are to hunters. Other than the meat, which is a delicacy in certain Asian cultures, Manis mysteria is almost certainly hunted for its scales, organs, and skin, which are used in traditional medicine.
