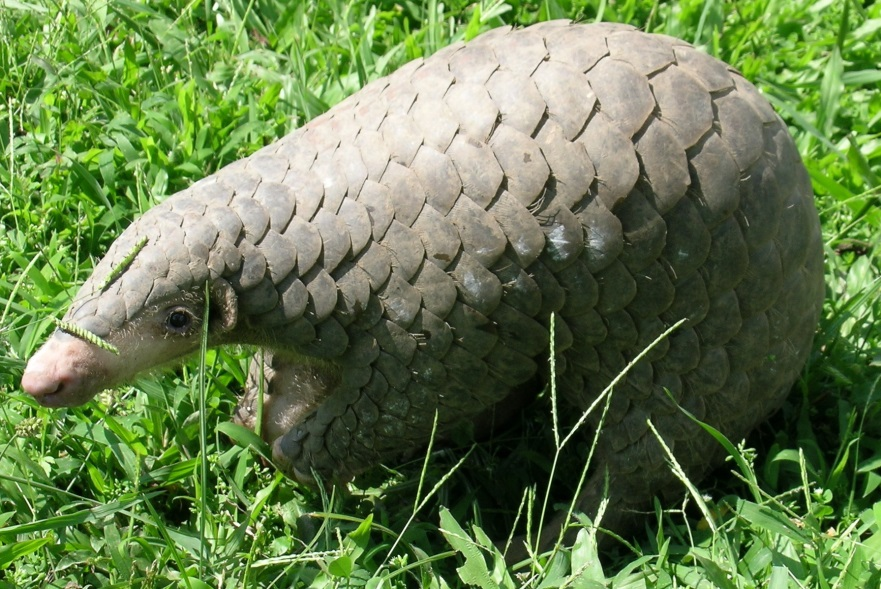

Conservation status
- Critically Endangered (IUCN 3.1)
- CITES Appendix I

Scientific classification
- Kingdom: Animalia
- Phylum: Chordata
- Class: Mammalia
- Order: Pholidota
- Family: Manidae
- Genus: Manis
- Subgenus: Manis
- Species: M. pentadactyla

Binomial name
- Manis pentadactyla Linnaeus, 1758

Subspecies
- See text
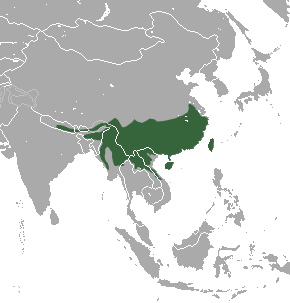
- Chinese pangolin range

= Chinese pangolin =

Species of mammal

The Chinese pangolin (Manis pentadactyla) is a pangolin native to the northern Indian subcontinent, northern parts of Southeast Asia and southern China. It has been listed as Critically Endangered on the IUCN Red List since 2014, as the wild population is estimated to have declined by more than 80% in three pangolin generations, equal to 21 years. It is threatened by poaching for the illegal wildlife trade.

== Characteristics ==
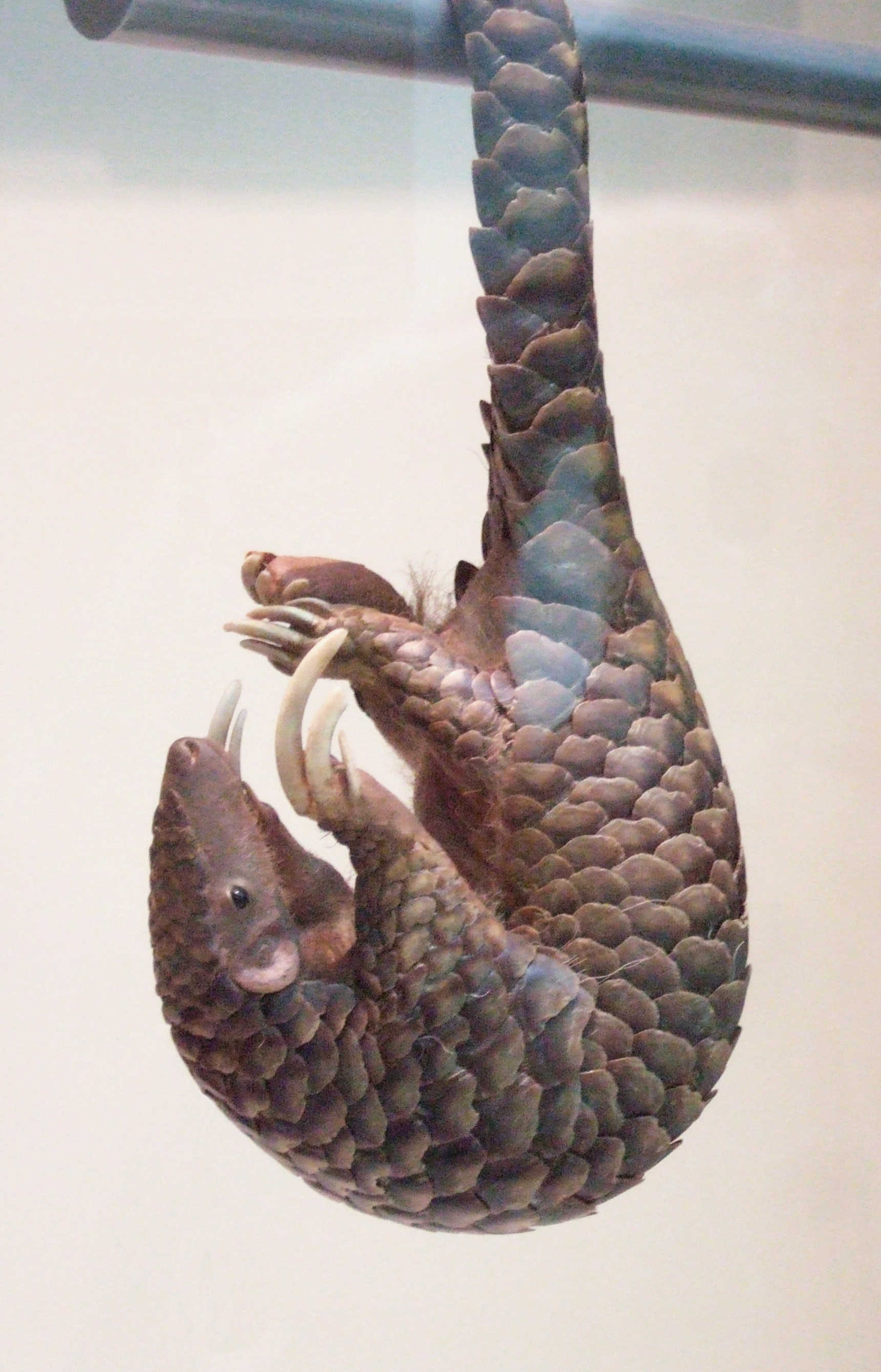
The Chinese pangolin has a prehensile tail.

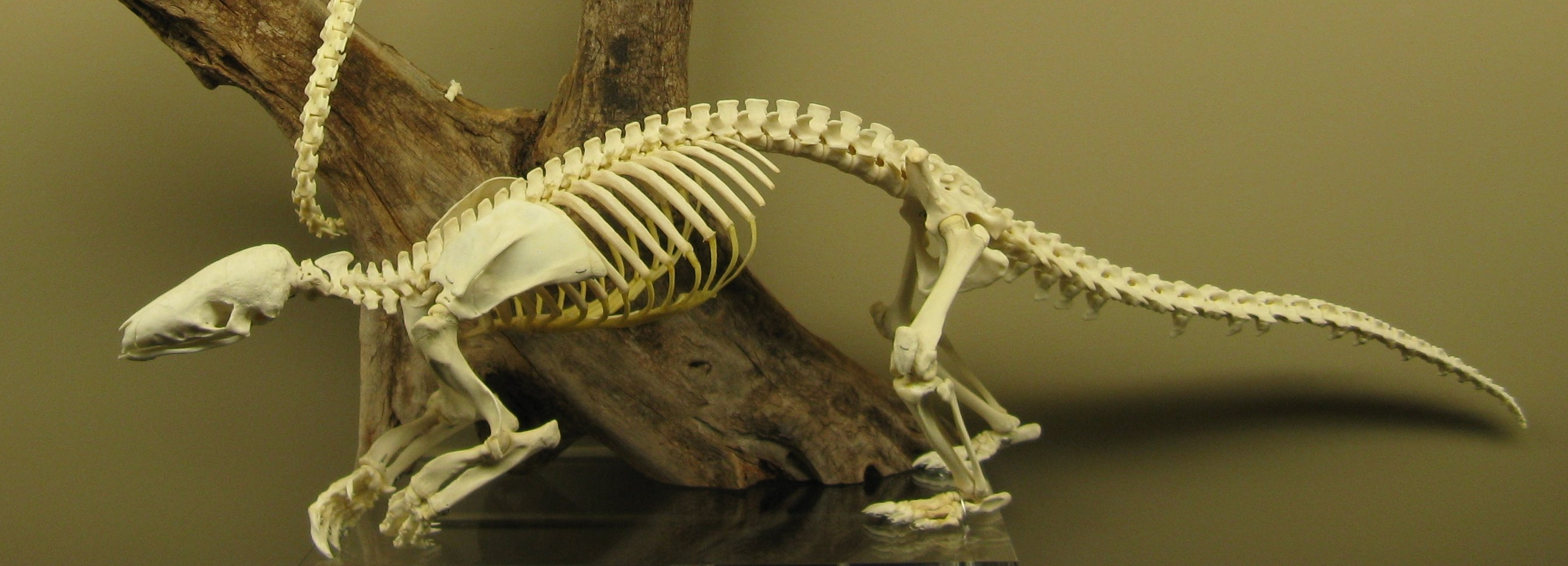
Chinese pangolin skeleton on display at the Museum of Osteology

The Chinese pangolin has the appearance of a scaly anteater. Its scales are typically grayish blue. Its head and body measure about 40–58 cm (16–23 in) and its tail measures about 25–38 cm (9.8–15.0 in). A mature Chinese pangolin weighs from 2 to 7 kilograms (4.4 to 15.4 lb). It has 18 rows of overlapping scales accompanied by hair, a rare combination in mammals. It has a small, narrow mouth and a little, pointed head. Its claws grow in as it grows older. The female gives birth to a single offspring at a time.

A newborn pangolin weighs about 93 g (3.3 oz), its length is about 45 cm (18 in). The Chinese pangolin reproduces in April and May when the weather warms. The young are born with soft scales, which harden after two days. Although the young pangolin can walk on its first day, the mother carries it on her back or tail. If the mother feels threatened, she immediately folds her baby onto her belly with the help of her tail. Male pangolins have been observed allowing the female and baby to share his burrow.

== Taxonomy ==
Manis pentadactyla was the scientific name proposed by Carl Linnaeus in 1758 for the Chinese pangolin. In the 19th century and 20th centuries, several Chinese pangolin specimens were collected and described:

- Manis pentadactyla auritus (by Brian Houghton Hodgson in 1836) from mainland Asia
- Manis pentadactyla pentadactyla (by Linnaeus in 1758) from Taiwan
- Manis pentadactyla pusilla (by Joel Asaph Allen in 1906) from Hainan

== Distribution and habitat ==
The Chinese pangolin is native to southern Nepal, northeast India, Bhutan, Bangladesh, Myanmar, northern Indochina, southern China including the island of Hainan and most of Taiwan. It has been recorded up to an elevation of 3,000 m (9,800 ft). It formerly ranged throughout provinces south of the Yangtze River, as well as north of the Yangtze River in southern Sichuan, northeast Chongqing, northwest Hubei and southwest Henan Provinces. Currently, confirmed populations in mainland China are known in Yunnan, Hainan, Guangxi, Guangdong, Hunan, Chongqing, Fujian, Jiangxi, Zhejiang and Anhui provinces. It inhabits primary and secondary tropical forests, bamboo forests, limestone forests, broadleaf forests, coniferous forests, agricultural fields and grasslands.

== Behaviour and ecology ==
The Chinese pangolin is a rather secretive, nocturnal animal. It moves slowly. Its hard scales work as a protective cover from predators, and when it feels threatened, it curls into a ball ("volvation").

=== Diet ===
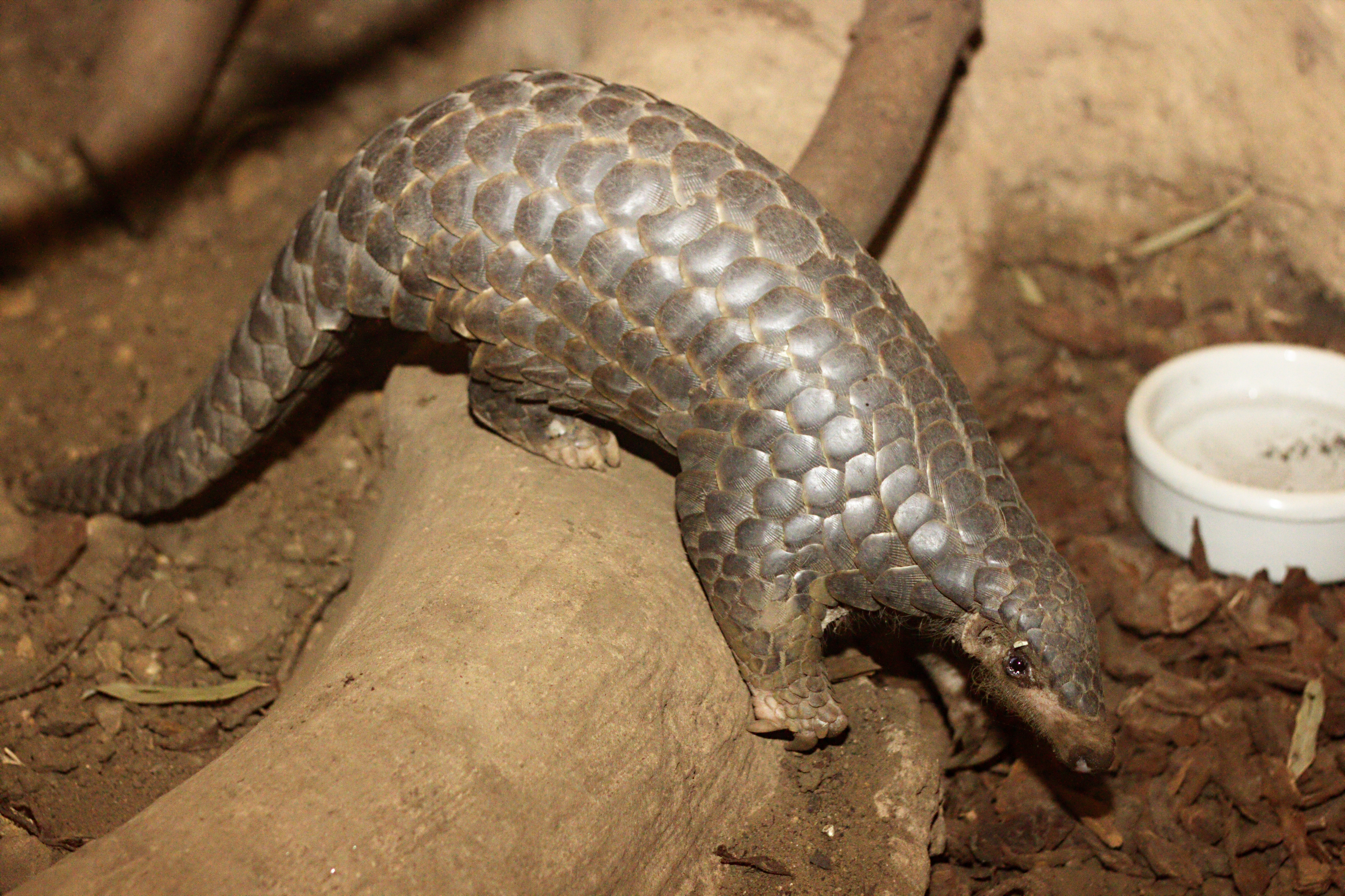
Chinese pangolin in Leipzig Zoo

The Chinese pangolin feeds mainly on insects, particularly termites and ants. It digs into ant nests and termite mounds with its large fore claws and extracts insects with its long, sticky tongue. The Chinese pangolin digs long burrows in the ground, which they use to sleep and hunt termites.

Gut contents of a wild juvenile individual killed by dogs in Hong Kong on 24 November 2013 included only 25,803 ants and 812 termites, representing 6 genera and 9 species. Ants represented the main food source in terms of species richness (8 species), abundance (97%), and biomass (98%), the most abundant species being Camponotus nicobarensis, Polyrhachis tyrannica, and Crematogaster dohrni. The invasive yellow crazy ant was also present in the stomach contents, a species commonly found near human settlements and at forest edges rather than in undisturbed forest, suggesting this individual foraged at forest margins, unlike the disturbance-avoiding behavior observed within heavily hunted rural populations.

Due to its specific diet, it can become arduous to provide the appropriate food for captive animals. Since the 1970s "pangolins are now almost unknown to visitors and are exhibited infrequently in zoos", and have "historically been difficult to maintain, with most captive animals dying within a short period after capture". When in their natural habitat, this species lives "on a diet of ants, termites, and various other invertebrates including bee larvae, flies, worms, earthworms, and crickets". After carefully creating new, more sustainable recipes in zoos, some of the ingredients used have included "egg, meat (ground beef, horse, canned feline diet), evaporated milk products, milk powder, fish protein, orchid leaves, commercial chows, psyllium seed, carrots, yeast, multivitamins, and insects (mixtures of silkworm larvae, earth, ants, termites, meal worms, or crickets)". A number of zoos that have kept pangolins under observation have found that the animals died most commonly after a few years, without breeding successfully. Researchers claim this outcome is correlated to the "poor acceptance of captive diets and digestive problems." The Chinese pangolin is considered to be high risk in terms of extinction.

== Threats ==
The Chinese pangolin is threatened foremost by poaching. Some Chinese people eat its meat, and its scales are used as an ingredient in traditional Chinese medicine (TCM). In the 1960s, about 170,000 to 180,000 Chinese pangolins were seized annually across the Chinese provinces Fujian, Hunan, Guangxi, Guizhou, Yunnan and Guangdong. The Convention on International Trade in Endangered Species in 2002 prohibited selling pangolins across national borders. Although China has already passed laws to protect the pangolin, it might not be enough to save the species. The Convention on International Trade in Endangered Species of Wild Fauna and Flora reports that pangolins are the most trafficked and poached mammal.

Chinese pangolin scales are sold to treat a wide variety of ailments, from cancer to upset stomach to asthma. Other pangolin body parts are also used in traditional Chinese medicine. 71% of the TCM practitioners interviewed in a 2020 study believed that pangolin scales could be substituted by other ingredients "in at least some, if not all, treatments". Local people in eastern Nepal consider pangolin scales as good-luck charms.

Though pangolins have been protected by legislation since the 1970s and 1980s, people still choose to hunt these endangered animals. After random inspections in May 2014, at the Kwai Chung Container Port in Hong Kong, officials detained scales from nearly 8,000 pangolins. Just two weeks later, Hong Kong officials seized a second shipment that contained scales from about 5,000 pangolins. In 2014, the Indonesian Ministry of Forestry referred to 587 cases of pangolin trafficking since 2006. The estimated value is US$4.3 million worth of pangolins on the illegal market.

In April 2013, the Philippine Coast Guard seized a boat containing 10,000 kg (22,000 lb) of pangolin meat and 400 boxes containing thousands of frozen skinned pangolins from Indonesia. The Regional Trial Court in Puerto Princesa city in Palawan province sentenced the boat captain to 12 years in prison and each crew member received from six to ten years. Each member of the crew was also fined $100,000.

== Conservation ==
In 2016, CITES moved the Chinese pangolin from its Appendix II, designating species not directly threatened with extinction but in need of protection to prevent exploitation, to Appendix I, reserved for species most directly threatened with extinction. The Appendix I listing prohibits commercial trade in wild-caught specimens. Many range countries have already passed legislation to protect it:

- 1972 – India fully protected the Chinese pangolin by classifying it as a Schedule I species under the Wildlife Protection Act.
- 1973 – Nepal made it a Schedule I protected animal under the National Parks and Wildlife Protection Act.
- 1976 – Hong Kong implemented the Wild Animals Protection Ordinance to protect this species and others that are endangered.
- 1989 – China classified the species as a State Category II protected animal with the Protection of Wildlife Act.
- 1990 – Taiwan added the entire Manis genus to be protected under the Wildlife Conservation Law, first passed in 1989.
- 1992 – China increased protection of the species using the Regulations on the Implementation of Protection of Terrestrial Wild Animals legislation. In the same year, Thailand classified the genus Manis as protected under the Wild Animals Reservation and Protection Act B.E. 2535.
- 1994 – Myanmar enacted the Protection of Wildlife and Wild Plants and Conservation of Natural Areas law, which fully protected the species.
- 2000 – China established more defined terms for the punishment of crimes specifically involving pangolins.
- 2006 – China enacted the Regulations on Management of Import and Export of Endangered Species of Wild Fauna and Flora to meet CITES guidelines. Additionally, Hong Kong increased its protection of the Chinese pangolin with the Protection of Endangered Species of Animals and Plants law. In 2006, Vietnam classified it as a fully protected species in group IIB of Decree 32 in the Management of Endangered, Precious, and Rare Species of Wild Plants and Animals.
- 2007 – China intensified its regulations for the use of pangolins in traditional medicines by terminating pangolin hunting licenses, and requiring current stockpiles of pangolin scales to be registered and subject to trade only through designated buyers, like hospitals. Meanwhile, Laos declared the species as near extinction, but of high importance in the prohibition category of the Wildlife and Aquatic Law.
- 2012 – Bangladesh granted protection of the Chinese pangolin through the Wildlife Conservation and Security Act.
- 2020 – China raised the protection status of all pangolin species, including the Chinese pangolin, to the highest level.

China has passed much more legislation for pangolin protection than other countries, because the species' population has drastically declined in China over the last few decades. This is the direct result of extreme poaching for pangolin scales and meat.

=== Conservation efforts ===
In May 2016, a poll representing 1,892 Chinese adults revealed that more than 80% of the Chinese public want pangolins to be protected. The survey was led by Aita Foundation and Humane Society International.

The IUCN SSC Pangolin Specialist Group made a proposal in July 2014 to increase awareness, funding, and research for pangolin conservation. Some of the plan's highlights include making protocols to monitor pangolin populations, establishing a consumption index of pangolin products, using DNA analysis to determine variation between and within species, and identifying species strongholds to determine best allocation of resources. Furthermore, the conservation plan aims to increase patrol-based monitoring around stronghold populations, increase awareness and education about the severity of the problem, and, most importantly, implement a demand reduction strategy for pangolin meat and scales.

Another alternative to legislation, proposed by IUCN, includes offering positive incentives, like monetary payments or control over land's resources, to local communities for their involvement in conservation efforts. Other researchers have proposed the importance of finding biological substitutes for endangered species used in traditional medicines. DNA barcoding and analysis could be used to determine what common species are genetically similar enough and produce similar effects as the Chinese pangolin scales. To crack down on poaching, the barcoding technique could also be used for accurate detection of species products being imported and exported.

The China Biodiversity Conservation and Green Development Foundation (CBCGDF), a non-profit and non-governmental organization is particularly proactive in doing research and collecting field data for the conservation of Chinese pangolins. Since July 2017, the Beijing-based NGO has established three Chinese pangolin Community Conservation Areas in Hunan, Guangxi and Jiangxi provinces.

In late August 2017, CBCGDF confiscated 33 Chinese pangolins from Chinese poachers and released them to the Guangxi Wildlife Rescue Centre. Suggestions from the foundation such as the improvement of their rescue regulations and procedures; their immediate release to the wild after full recovery; keeping information open to the public; revising the endangered species conservation laws and regulations in Guangxi, followed the release. However, only 14 Chinese pangolins survived. At the World Pangolin Day 2017, CBCGDF called for deletion of pangolin scales from the Traditional Chinese Medicine Book. CBCGDF also called for the burning of confiscated pangolin scales illegally trafficked to China. Moreover, in July 2018, a conference organised by CBCGDF hosted the Global Biodiversity Information Facility (GBIF). During that conference, CBCGDF openly shared recent data on Chinese pangolins with GBIF.

== See also ==
- List of mammals in Hong Kong
- List of mammals in Taiwan
