= Nantou County Council =

Council of Nantou County, Taiwan

Coordinates: 23.9074°N 120.6790°E

Nantou County Council 南投縣議會

Type
- Type: County Council

Leadership
- Speaker: He Sheng-feng
- Deputy Speaker: Pan Yi-zhuan

Structure
- Seats: 37
- Political groups: KMT (12); DPP (7); TPP (1); Independent (16)

Elections
- Voting system: Single non-transferable vote
- Last election: 2022

Meeting place
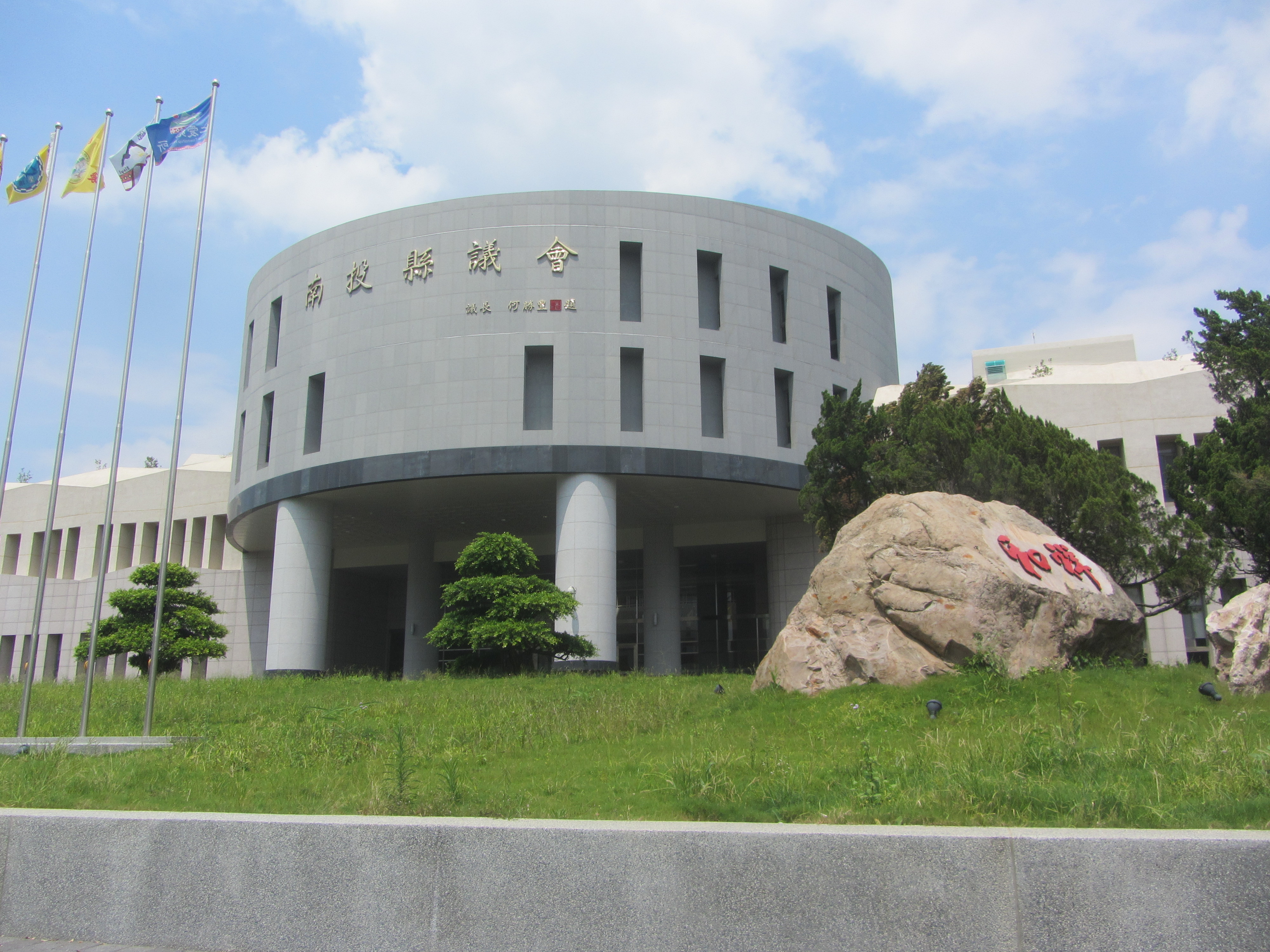
- The Building of Nantou County Council; Nantou City, Nantou County, Taiwan

Website
- Official website (in Chinese)

The Nantou County Council (NTCC; traditional Chinese: 南投縣議會; simplified Chinese: 南投县议会; pinyin: Nántóu Xiàn Yìhuì) is the elected county council of Nantou County, Republic of China. The council composes of 37 councilors lastly elected through the 2022 Republic of China local election on 26 November 2022.

== Organization ==
=== Committees ===
- First Review Committee
- Second Review Committee
- Third Review Committee
- Fourth Review Committee

=== Administrative units ===
- Chief of Secretary
- Office of Secretariat
- Division of Agenda
- Division of General Affairs
- Division of Public Affairs
- Statue Office
- Accounting Office
- Personnel Office

== See also ==
- Nantou County Government
