= Nantou County Government =

Government of Nantou County, Taiwan

Coordinates: 23.9026°N 120.6905°E

- 南投縣政府

Agency overview
- Formed: 21 October 1950
- Jurisdiction: Nantou County
- Headquarters: Nantou City
- Employees: 8,796
- Agency executive: Hsu Shu-hua, Magistrate
- Website: www.nantou.gov.tw

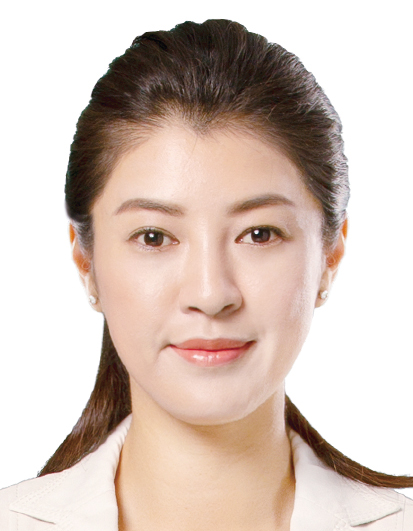
Hsu Shu-hua, Magistrate of Nantou County

The Nantou County Government (traditional Chinese: 南投縣政府; simplified Chinese: 南投县政府; pinyin: Nántóu Xiàn Zhèngfǔ) is the local government of Nantou County, Taiwan.

== History ==
The county government was established on 21 October 1950.

== Administrative divisions ==
- Police Bureau
- Fire Bureau
- Environmental Protection Bureau
- Tax Bureau
- Cultural Affairs Bureau

== See also ==
- Nantou County Council
