= Xiaolin Pingpu Cultural Museum =

Museum in Jiaxian, Kaohsiung, Taiwan

- 小林平埔族群文物館
- Established: 1996
- Location: Jiaxian, Kaohsiung, Taiwan
- Coordinates: 23°09′03.2″N 120°38′04.1″E
- Type: museum

The Xiaolin Pingpu Cultural Museum (traditional Chinese: 小林平埔族群文物館; simplified Chinese: 小林平埔族群文物馆; pinyin: Xiǎolín Píngpǔ Zúqún Wénwùguǎn) is a museum in Jiaxian District, Kaohsiung, Taiwan.

== History ==
The museum was officially opened in 1996. In August 2009, it was destroyed by Typhoon Morakot. It was then rebuilt afterwards with a cost of NT$280 million. The reconstruction work was completed in 2012.

== Architecture ==
The museum building spans over an area of 6,453 m^{2}. It is housed in a two-story building with a theme of earth-terrace house. Its roof is decorated with straws and its wall is decorated with bamboos.

== Exhibitions ==
The museum displays various aspects about the plain indigenous people of Taiwan. It exhibits the traditional agriculture and hunting methods of the indigenous people. It also features the history of the rebuilding efforts of the local community after the 2009 Typhoon Morakot.

== See also ==
- List of museums in Taiwan
