= Chishan =

Chishan may refer to:

== China ==
- Chishan Prison, Yuanjiang, Yiyang, Hunan, China
- Jishan County, Yuncheng, Shanxi, China
- Qishan County, Baoji, Shaanxi, China

== Taiwan ==
- Cishan District, Kaohsiung, Taiwan
- Qishan River, southwest Taiwan

== See also ==
- Cishan (disambiguation)
- Jishan (disambiguation)
- Qishan (disambiguation)
