= Cishan =

Cishan may mean:

== China ==
- Cishan culture, a Neolithic culture in southern Hebei, People's Republic of China
- Cishan, Wu'an (磁山镇), town in Wu'an, Hebei, People's Republic of China

== Taiwan ==
- Cishan, Kaohsiung (旗山區), a township in Kaohsiung, Republic of China (Taiwan)
- Cishan River (旗山溪), tributary of the Kaoping River in Taiwan

== See also ==
- Chishan
