= Cemetery of Zhenghaijun =

Cemetery in Jiaxian, Kaohsiung, Taiwan

Cemetery of Zhenghaijun Zhenhai Military Cemetery
- 鎮海軍墓
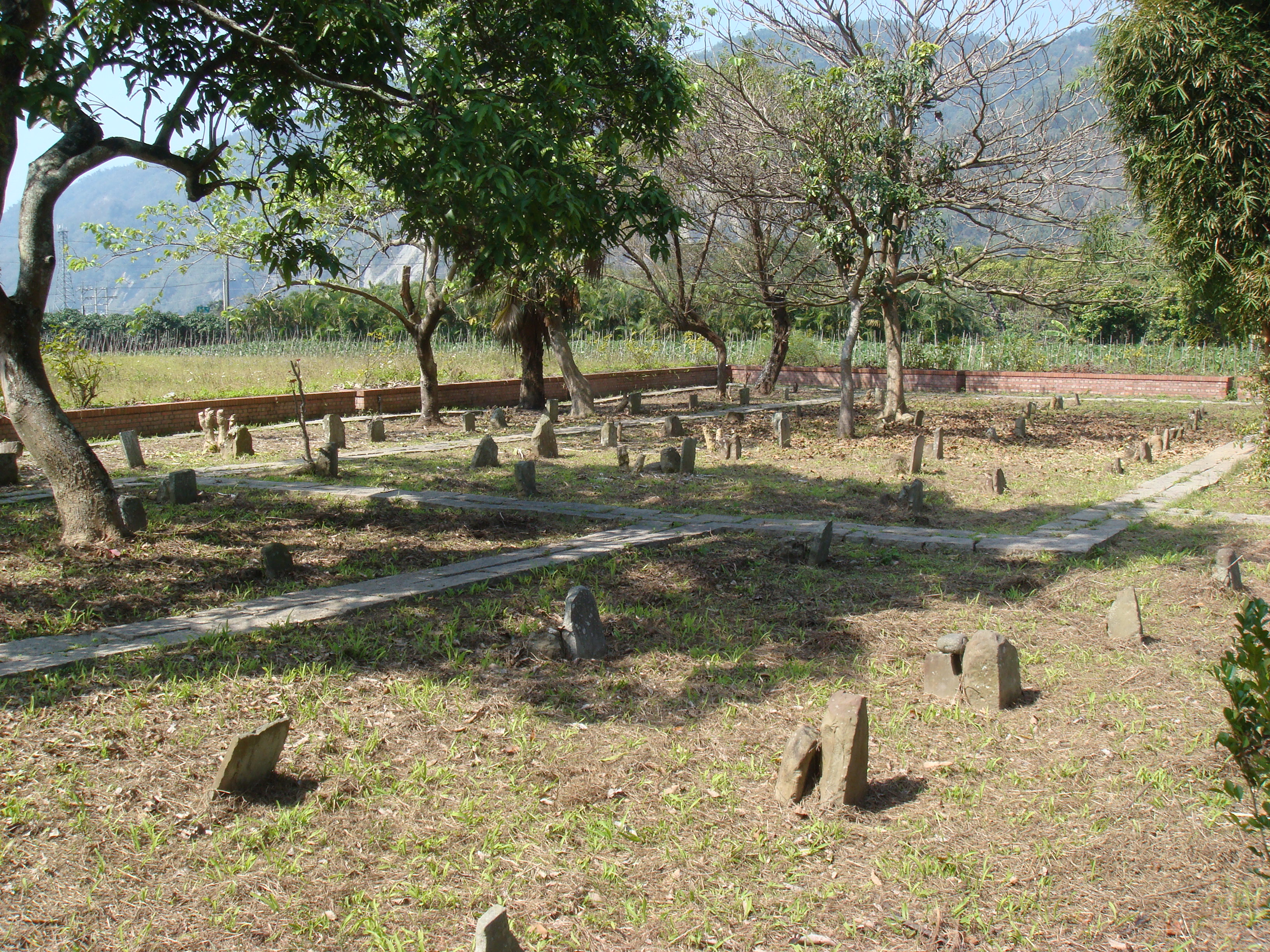

Details
- Established: c. 1885
- Location: Jiaxian, Kaohsiung, Taiwan
- Coordinates: 23°09′15″N 120°38′20″E
- Type: Cemetery
- No. of graves: 85
- No. of interments: ~96 (some lost)
- Find a Grave: Cemetery of Zhenghaijun; Zhenhai Military Cemetery

Cemetery of Zheng-Hai-Jun (Chinese: 甲仙鎮海軍墓; pinyin: Jiǎxiān Zhèn Hǎijūn Mù; literally means "the corps of coast guard") is a cemetery in Siaolin Village, Jiaxian District, Kaohsiung, Taiwan. It is the monument the class of county in Taiwan. There buried soldiers were guards of old road from Dapu Township, Chiayi County to Chihshang, Taitung County in Qing dynasty. There were 96 graves noted by Record of Jiasian Township in 1985, but now there are only 85 graves.

== History ==
After Taiwan Expedition of 1874, Beijing government that was regnal by Tongzhi Emperor began to change the policy about development in eastern Taiwan. There were six roads to connect to west and Houshang (Chinese: 後山 Eastern Taiwan) went down from Chiayi city after 1874, but it was difficult to keep safe and unblocked in these roads. Indigenous people and bandit destroyed those roads soon, and there was only one way which names Road of Qinshuiying (Chinese: 浸水營古道) contact Fangliao, Pingtung to Balangwei (Chinese: 巴塱衛 Dawu, Taitung today).

In 1885, the twelfth year of the reign of the Guangxu Emperor, the emperor commanded Liu Mingchuan (Chinese: 劉銘傳) to go to Taiwan and take responsibility for its defense. For taking communication and administration purposes, Liu Mingchuang began design new roads through from west to east.

Liu Mingchuan commanded nominative General Yang Jinlong and Lieutenant General Zhang Gaoyuan leading their soldier seven tenth to build road for eastern from the base Chiayi. Gen. Yang Jinlong directed his troop Zhenghai middle corps, front battalion. (In the 19th century, battalion is the unit for main force controlled in China.) Gen. Zhang Gaoyuan directed his troop Zhenghai main corps, mail battalion, machine gun company. The total was about 1000 soldiers. The same year March, they arrived Chiayi, and advance Dapu that is a township in bound between Tainan and Chiayi in 18 March. They passed the headstream of Kaoping River and meted another troop building road from Taitung County led by Lieutenant General Zhang Zhaolian in the pass of Mount Guan. Cemetery of Zhenghaijun was in the historical road near old post of Zhenghai middle corps. Those soldiers died in infectious disease in hotly southern Taiwan.

== See also ==
- Taiwan under Qing rule
