= Nanqingshuigou River =

River in Taiwan

Coordinates: 23°48′58″N 120°45′57″E

Nanqingshuigou Creek（Traditional Chinese：南清水溝溪）is one of the main tributaries of the Zhuoshui River, with a total length of 17.5 kilometers and a drainage area of 68 square kilometers. It originates from Phoenix Mountain at an elevation of 1,696 meters. The entire watershed is located in Lugu, Nantou County. Together with the Dongpurui River, it is one of the major rivers in Lugu Township. The downstream area forms the Nanqingshuigou Creek alluvial plain, situated in the northern part of Lugu Township, and it finally flows into the Zhuoshui River near Ruitian.
