= Jisan =

Jisan may refer to:

- Jisan, a deity in the Zakharan culture of the Al-Qadim world of the Dungeons & Dragons role-playing game
- Jisan station, metro station in Daegu, South Korea
- Jisan Valley Rock Festival, music festival that was held at Jisan Valley Ski Resort in Icheon, South Korea
- Jisan Bank, in the Numbers South Korean TV series

== See also ==
- Jishan (disambiguation)
- Jisun
