= Jiaxian Bridge =

Bridge in Jiaxian, Kaohsiung, Taiwan

Jiaxian Bridge 甲仙大橋
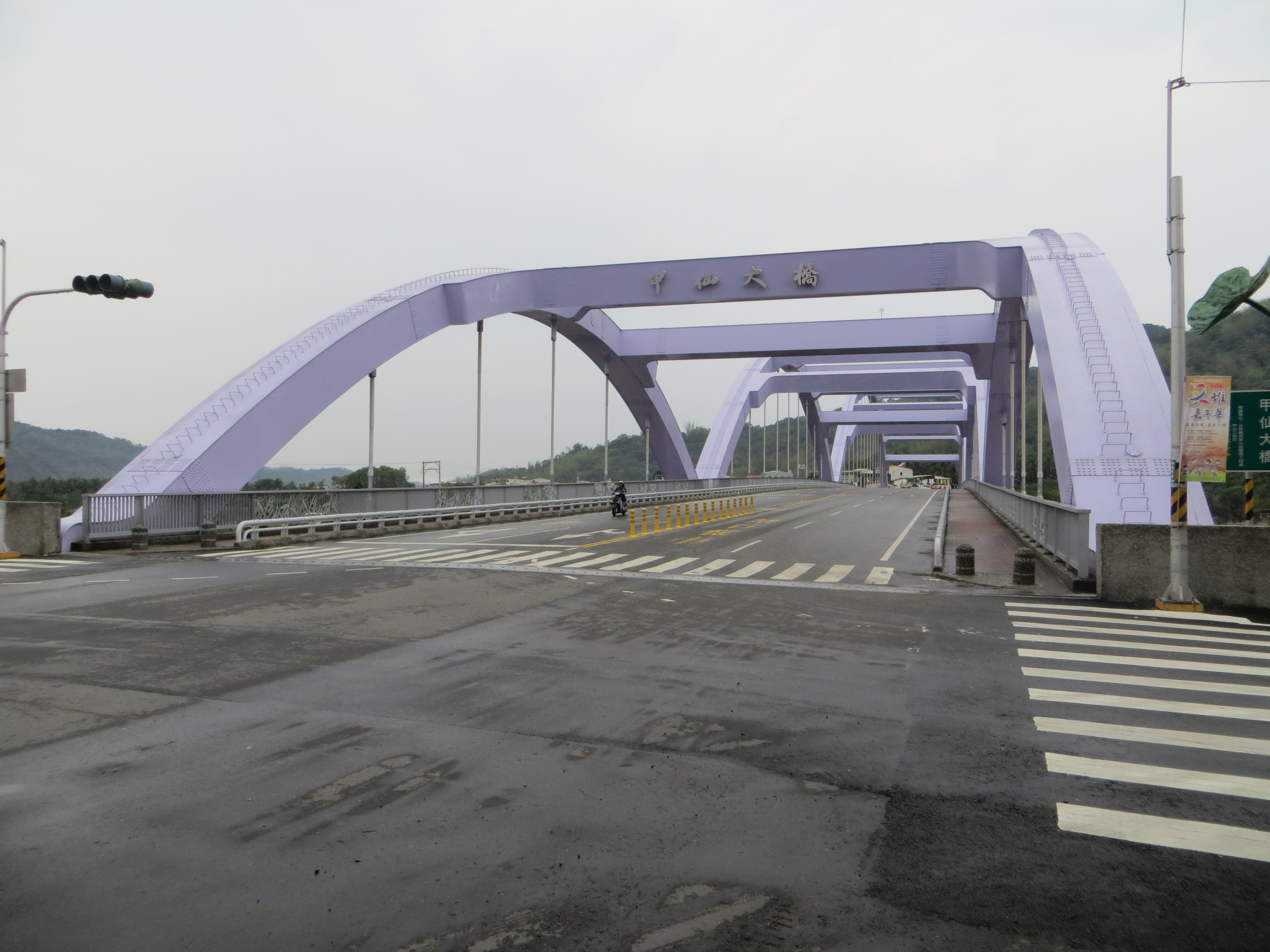
- Coordinates: 23°04′50.1″N 120°35′05.4″E
- Crossed: Qishan River
- Locale: Jiaxian, Kaohsiung, Taiwan
- Other name: Jiashian Bridge

Characteristics
- Design: arch bridge
- Total length: 300 m
- Width: 21 m

History
- Construction cost: NT$560 million
- Opened: June 2010
- Collapsed: August 2009

Location
- Interactive map of Jiaxian Bridge

The Jiaxian Bridge (traditional Chinese: 甲仙大橋; simplified Chinese: 甲仙大桥; pinyin: Jiǎxiān Dàqiáo) is an arch bridge in Jiaxian District, Kaohsiung, Taiwan. It crosses the Qishan River.

== History ==
In August 2009, the original bridge was torn down by Typhoon Morakot. Soon afterwards, the bridge was reconstructed and was officially opened in June 2010 in a ceremony attended by President Ma Ying-jeou and Kaohsiung County Magistrate Yang Chiu-hsing.

== Architecture ==
The bridge is an arch bridge with a sculpture of taro located at the bridgehead. It is painted with light purple color. It spans over a length of 300 meters and a width of 21 meters. It was constructed with a cost of NT$560 million.

== Transportation ==
The bridge is part of Southern Cross-Island Highway.

== See also ==
- List of bridges in Taiwan
