= Jishan =

Jishan may refer to the following:

== China ==
- Jishan County (稷山县), Yuncheng, Shanxi
- Jishan railway station (吉山站), Tianhe District, Guangzhou, Guangdong
- Jishan, Anhui (籍山镇), town in and subdivision of Nanling County, Anhui
- Jishan, Hubei (纪山镇), town in and subdivision of Shayang County, Hubei
- Jishan, Shandong (箕山镇), town in and subdivision of Juancheng County, Shandong
- Mount Ji (嵇山), a mountain near Bozhou in Anhui

== Taiwan ==
- Jishan Gatehouse (積善樓), historical site in Taichung, Taiwan

== See also ==
- Chishan
