= Siaolin Village =

Siaolin Village 小林里
- Village
- Coordinates: 23°09′45″N 120°38′40″E
- Country: Taiwan
- County: Kaohsiung
- District: Jiasian

Government
  - Mayor: 林建忠

Area
  - Total: 47.913 km^{2} (18.499 sq mi)

Population (September 2019)
  - Total: 603
  - Density: 12.6/km^{2} (32.6/sq mi)

Siaolin Village (Chinese: 小林里; Hanyu Pinyin: Xiǎolín; Tongyong Pinyin: Siǎolín; Wade–Giles: Hsiao-Lin), also spelled Xiaolin Village, is a village in Jiasian District, Kaohsiung, Taiwan. It is mostly agricultural and home to one of the largest communities of the Taivoan people.

In 2009, Typhoon Morakot brought unprecedented rainfall to southern Taiwan, including Siaolin. A landslide dam upstream of Siaolin failed catastrophically, resulting in a devastating mudflow to completely cover the northern half of the village. 471 people lost their lives in the incident.

Due to the influx of Siraya people in early 18th century to Yujin Basin, Taivoan people started to migrate from Tainan to Kaohsiung between 1722 and 1744. Nearly 150 years later, some Taivoan people from Aliguan in Kaohsiung further migrated to a river terrace 10 km (6.2 mi) to the north of Aliguan for hunting. During the Japanese Occupation Period, in order to have Taivoan people counter the Mountain Indigenous people so as to control the camphor forest in Jiasian and Namasia, Japanese government collectively moved more Taivoan people to the river terrace, which later became Siaolin Village in 1904, said to be named after the family name of the local Japanese police officer Kobayashi (Hiragana: こばやし; Chinese: 小林; Tongyong Pinyin: Siǎolín).

== Geography ==
Siaolin is the largest village within Jiasian District, covering the northern half of the district. It sits in a valley along the Qishan River, surrounded by the Alishan Range to the west and the Yushan Range to the east. There are two major settlements within Siaolin Village: Siaolin to the north, and Wulipu to the south.

== Typhoon Morakot ==
Between August 6, 2009, and August 10, 2009, Taiwan was hit by Typhoon Morakot, which brought about unprecedented rainfall and flooding across the country. The heavy rainfall caused landslides in mountainous regions in southern Taiwan, especially Jiasian, Liouguei, Taoyuan, and Namasia districts. According to National Taiwan University professor Chen Hong-yu, in the 5 day period before the landslide, Qishan River and the nearby Laonong River carried an abnormal amount of sediment. The sediment carried during the typhoon exceeded 80% of the sediment that the Gaoping River, which both rivers empty into, carries in an entire year.

=== Debris flow and landslide dam ===
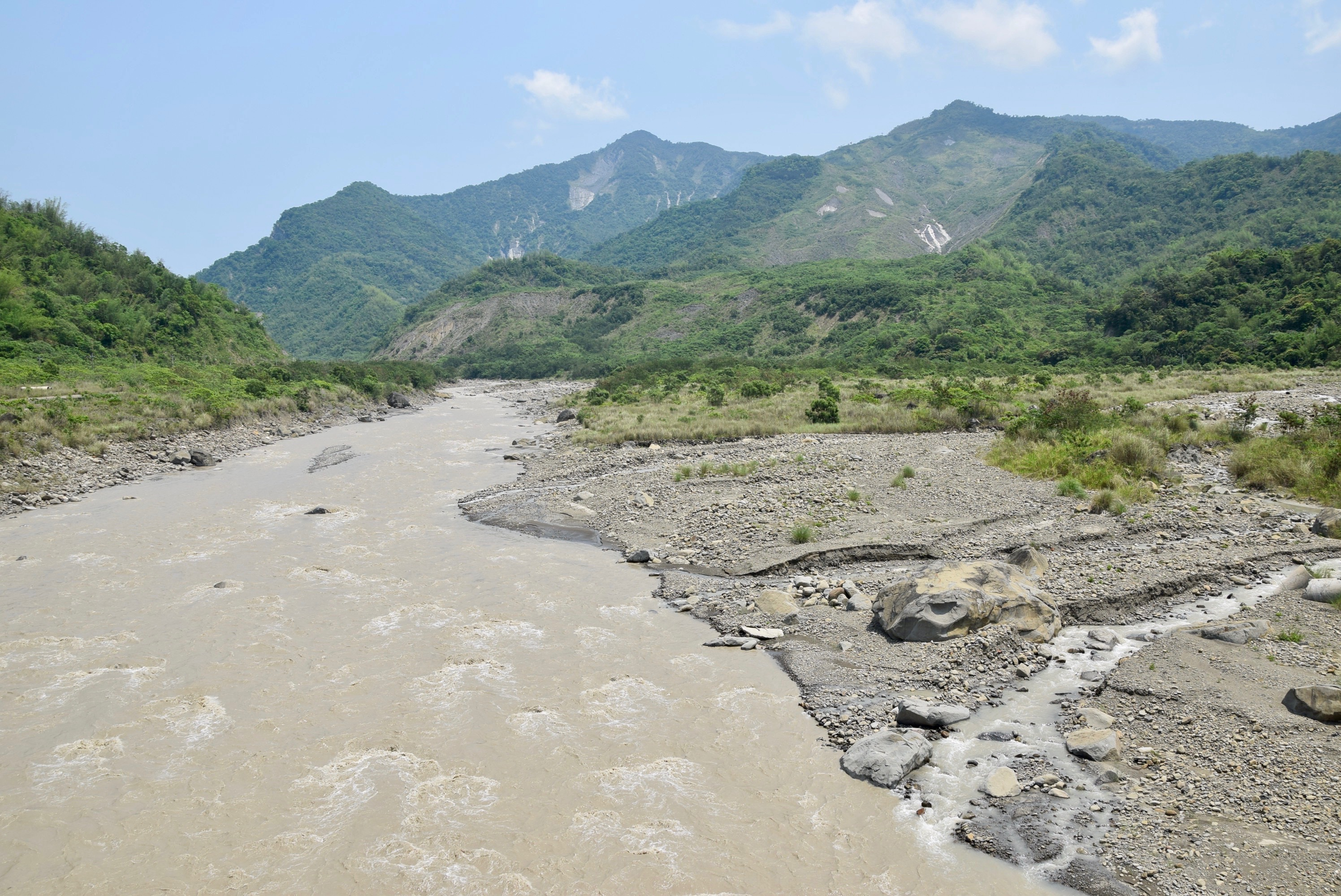
Former site of Siaolin after the incident.

At 6:16 AM, August 9, a debris flow occurred from a height of 1445 m on Xiandu Mountain, located upstream on the Qishan River from Siaolin. Saturated with water, 23,000,000 cubic meters of soil rushed downhill at a speed of 50 m/s into the Qishan River. Witnesses reported that two large bangs were heard on Xiandu Mountain immediately prior to the debris flow. The slide immediately covered the northern half of Siaolin and formed a landslide dam, blocking the river's flow. Within 50 minutes, the landslide dam failed catastrophically, causing another debris flow with a 38% solid composition to erupt downstream, covering the rest of Siaolin. The average depth of the flow was 44.6 m. In the incident, the entirety of Siaolin, including around 169 residences, were covered by the flooding. Wulipu, which had a higher elevation, was not damaged. The incident resulted in the deaths of 471 people.

=== Response ===
A bus driven by 60 year-old Bang Rong-gui was just leaving Siaolin when Bang saw the landslide. Dropping off his passengers in Wulipu, he turned around and went back to transport more survivors. He managed to pick up 30 more people, but was unfortunately covered by a separate landslide. All lives aboard were lost.

Initially, rescuers and soldiers were dispatched by the government to look for survivors, but no progress was made due to poor weather conditions. Helicopters from Shanlin District were grounded, while collapsed road surfaces along Highway 29 also prevented rescuers from reaching the settlement. The following day, twenty one rescuers, eight from the district fire department and thirteen from the military, arrived in Siaolin via helicopter. They reported that out of all the buildings, only 2 were left standing. Soon after, more helicopters were sent out, rescuing 61 people from Siaolin and 14 from other villages. Survivors were directed to evacuation centers in Wulipu, Qishan, and Meinong. Officials from the district fire department also entered the settlement via foot, reporting that around 500-600 people may have lost their lives. On August 11, rescuers were finally able to reach the settlement by car. Excavators were brought to find dead bodies, but none were found.

Emergency housing was set up in Wulipu for Siaolin survivors. Due to safety concerns, residents and family members were not allowed to enter the settlement. However, people still snuck in by foot. Evidence of incense being burned were found on the bridge number 8, connecting Siaolin with Wulipu. On August 13, residents were allowed to enter the village guided by the military.

=== Aftermath ===
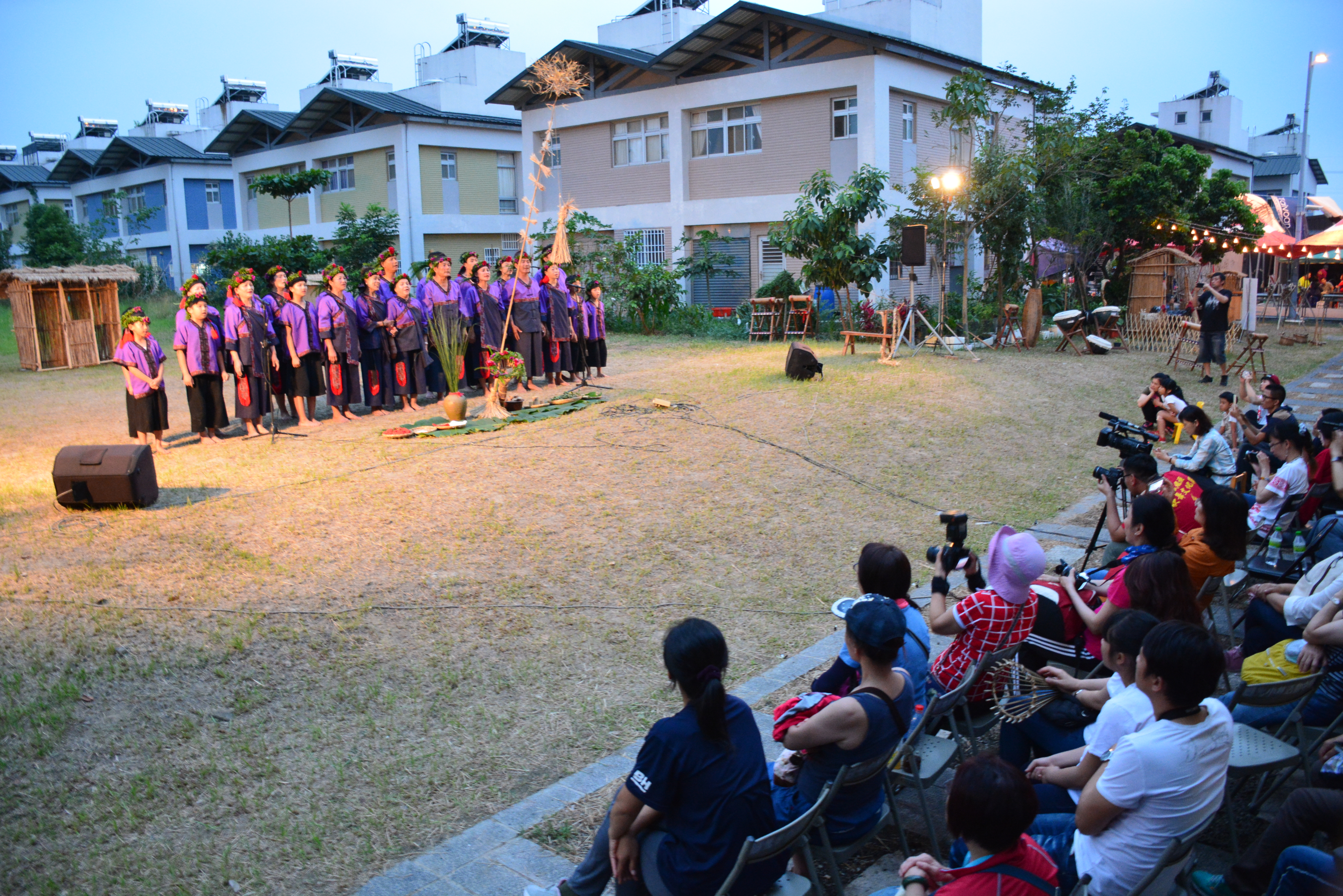
Taivoan festival held at the new elementary school.

Three permanent settlements for residents were built, with one in Wulipu, one on Taiwan Sugar's land in Shanlin, and third on Tsu Chi's land in Shanlin. The first two villages are organized by the Red Cross Society of the Republic of China, while the third is by Tsu Chi. Xiaolin Elementary School was rebuilt in Wulipu in 2012. A memorial park at the site of Xiaolin was constructed with 100 trees, symbolizing the families that lost their lives in the landslide.

Some pointed to a construction by the Water Resources Agency as the cause of the landslide. Since 2003, a pipeline was under construction to redirect water from the Laonong River into the Caolan River, which would feed into the Zengwen Reservoir. The pipeline passes north of Siaolin, near the site of the landslide. Some blame this construction for weakening the soil and causing the landslide; however, the government held that the heavy rainfall was the real cause. After the incident, construction of the pipeline continued for a year, but was halted due to backlash from residents.

After the landslide, researchers found a new fault line at the site of the landslide.

Minor planet 185636, discovered by Lulin Observatory, was named "Siao Lin" in memorial of Siaolin Village.
