= Typhoon Morakot =

Pacific typhoon in 2009

Typhoon Morakot (Kiko)
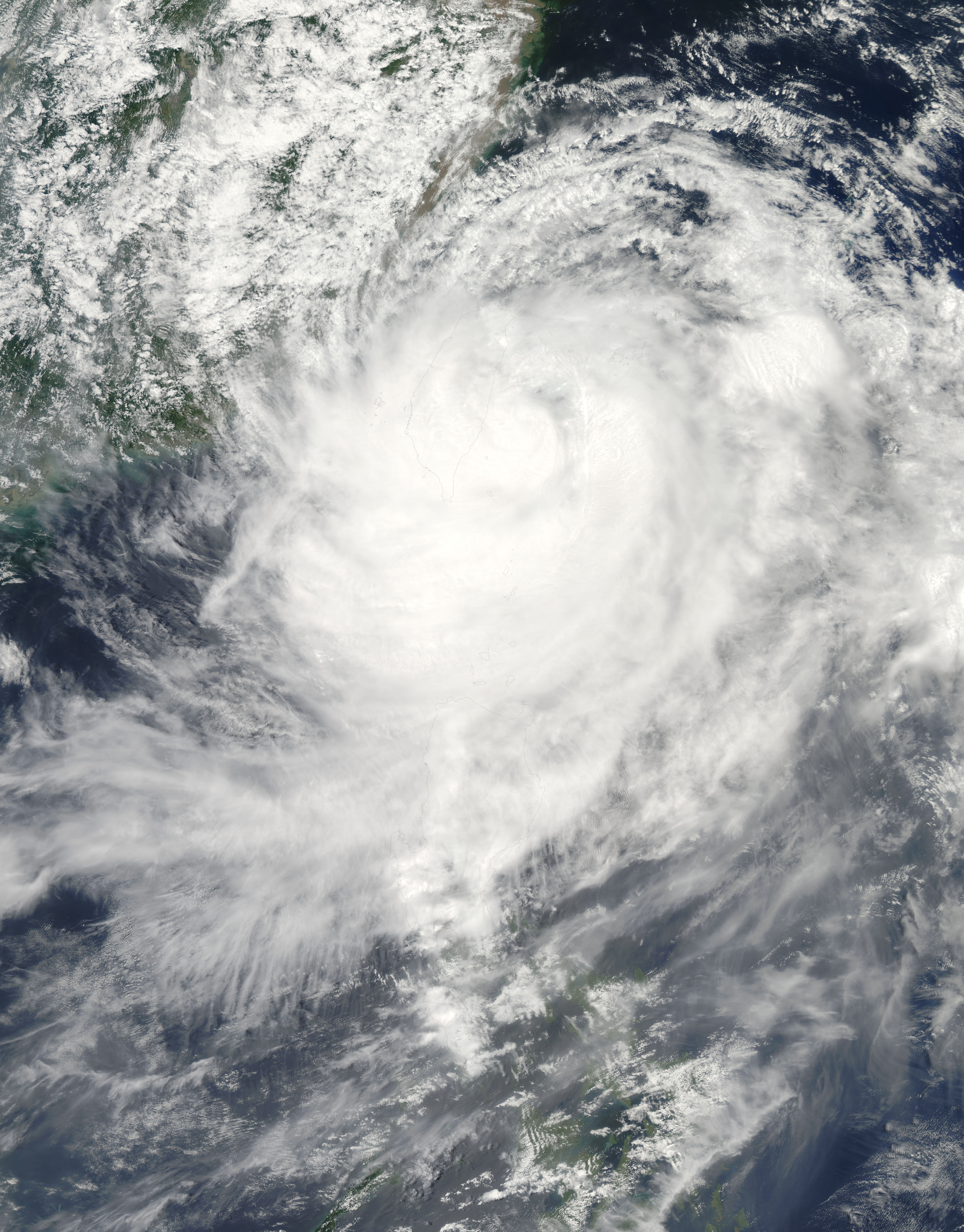
- Morakot approaching Taiwan on August 7

Meteorological history
- Formed: August 2, 2009
- Dissipated: August 11, 2009

Typhoon
- 10-minute sustained (JMA)
- Highest winds: 130 km/h (80 mph)
- Lowest pressure: 945 hPa (mbar); 27.91 inHg

Category 1-equivalent typhoon
- 1-minute sustained (SSHWS/JTWC)
- Highest winds: 150 km/h (90 mph)
- Lowest pressure: 954 hPa (mbar); 28.17 inHg

Overall effects
- Fatalities: 809
- Damage: $6.2 billion (2009 USD)
- Areas affected: Philippines, Japan, Taiwan, China, Korea
- IBTrACS
- Part of the 2009 Pacific typhoon season

Typhoon Morakot, (Note: The name Morakot (Thai: มรกต, [mɔː˧ ra˦˥ kot̚˨˩]) was contributed by Thailand and means emerald in Thai.) known in the Philippines as Typhoon Kiko, was the wettest and deadliest typhoon to impact Taiwan in recorded history. The eighth named storm and fourth typhoon of the 2009 Pacific typhoon season, Morakot wrought catastrophic damage in Taiwan, killing 755 people and leaving 26 people missing, and causing roughly NT$110 billion (US$3.3 billion) in damages. Morakot originated as a tropical depression in the West Pacific on August 2. The system initially moved northeastward, before taking a westward track, developing into a tropical storm on August 3, with the JMA giving it the name Morakot. The storm gradually strengthened as it moved towards Taiwan, intensifying into a Category 1-equivalent typhoon on August 5. Morakot reached its peak intensity on August 7, with a minimum central pressure of 945 millibars (27.9 inHg), maximum 10-minute sustained winds of 140 km/h (85 mph), and maximum 1-minute sustained winds of 150 km/h (90 mph). Afterward, Morakot's forward motion slowed and the system gradually weakened, making landfall on central Taiwan later that day as a severe tropical storm. Over the next day, Morakot slowly meandered over Taiwan, before emerging into the Taiwan Strait and turning northward, making landfall on mainland China on August 9. Afterward, Morakot accelerated northward while gradually weakening, before later turning northeastward. On August 11, Morakot degenerated into a remnant low in the East China Sea, before dissipating on August 13, over northern Japan.

The storm produced copious amounts of rainfall, peaking at 2,777 mm (109.3 in), far surpassing the previous record of 1,736 mm (68.35 in) set by Typhoon Herb in 1996. The extreme amount of rain triggered enormous mudflows and severe flooding throughout southern Taiwan. One landslide (and subsequent flood) destroyed the entire town of Siaolin, killing over 400 people. The slow-moving storm also caused widespread damage in China, leaving eight people dead and causing $1.4 billion (2009 USD) in damages. Nearly 2,000 homes were destroyed in the country and 136,000 more were reported to have sustained damage. In the wake of the storm, Taiwan's government faced extreme criticism for the slow response to the disaster and for initially deploying only roughly 2,100 soldiers to the affected regions. Later, the number of soldiers working to recover trapped residents increased to 46,000. Rescue crews were able to retrieve thousands of trapped residents from buried villages and isolated towns across the island. Days later, Taiwan's president Ma Ying-jeou apologized for the government's slow response publicly. On August 19, the Taiwan government announced that they would start a NT$100 billion (US$3 billion) reconstruction plan that would take place over a three-year span in the devastated regions of southern Taiwan. Days after the storm, international aid began to be sent to the island.

The storm also caused severe flooding in the northern Philippines that killed 26 people due to the enhancement of the southwest monsoon.

== Meteorological history ==
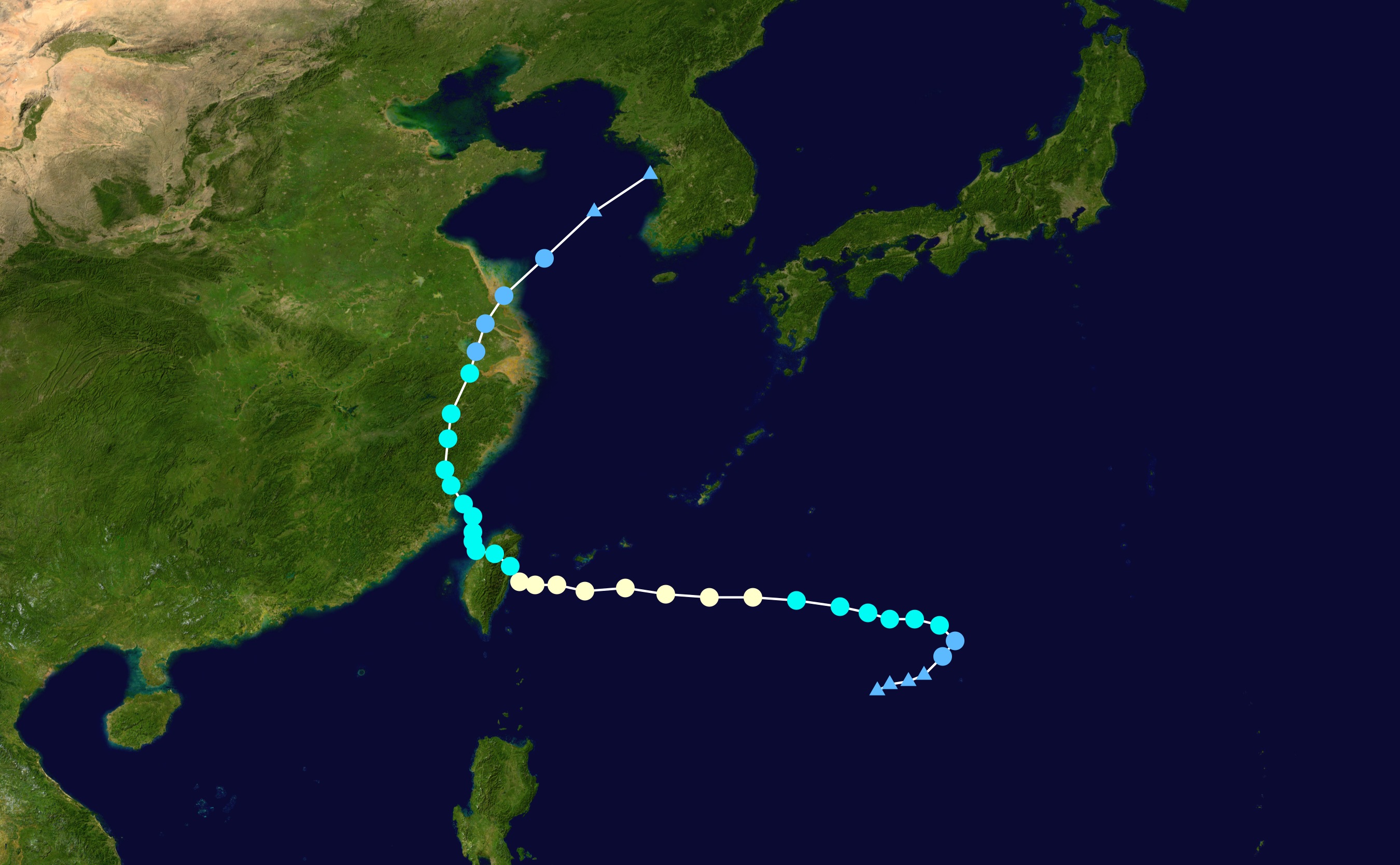
Map plotting the storm's track and intensity, according to the Saffir–Simpson scale Map key Saffir–Simpson scale Tropical depression (≤38 mph, ≤62 km/h) Tropical storm (39–73 mph, 63–118 km/h) Category 1 (74–95 mph, 119–153 km/h) Category 2 (96–110 mph, 154–177 km/h) Category 3 (111–129 mph, 178–208 km/h) Category 4 (130–156 mph, 209–251 km/h) Category 5 (≥157 mph, ≥252 km/h) Unknown Storm type Tropical cyclone Subtropical cyclone Extratropical cyclone, remnant low, tropical disturbance, or monsoon depression

Early on August 2, 2009, the Japan Meteorological Agency (JMA) reported that a tropical depression had formed within a monsoon trough located about 1,000 km (620 mi) east of Luzon, However the depression remained weak and was downgraded to an area of low pressure, before regenerating later that day. Both the Joint Typhoon Warning Center (JTWC) and the Philippine Atmospheric, Geophysical and Astronomical Services Administration (PAGASA) then started to monitor the depression early the next day, while it was located about 700 km (430 mi) to the southeast of Okinawa, Japan, with the PAGASA assigning the name Kiko to the depression. The JTWC reported at this time that the storm consisted of an area of convection, with deep convection flaring on the western side of a partially exposed low-level circulation center.

Later on August 3, the JMA reported that the depression had intensified into a tropical storm, and gave it the name Morakot. The JTWC further designated the system as Tropical Depression 09W, as deep convection had increased over the low-level circulation center, and the agency reported that the storm was moving around a low-level ridge of high pressure, which was located to the east of the Morakot's low-level circulation center. On the morning of August 4, the JTWC reported that the Morakot had steadily intensified into a tropical storm, as 1-minute sustained wind speeds were estimated to be near 65 km/h (40 mph), with deep convective banding building toward the low-level circulation center, under the influence of a subtropical ridge located to the east of the system. Later that day, the JMA reported that Morakot had intensified into a severe tropical storm, before it was upgraded to a typhoon by both the JMA and the JTWC early the next day.

Initially, the JTWC anticipated that Morakot would intensify into a powerful typhoon while approaching China, peaking as a Category 4-equivalent typhoon on the Saffir–Simpson Hurricane Scale (SSHWS). However, due to the size of the typhoon, while the barometric pressure steadily decreased, the maximum winds only increased slightly. Early on August 7, the storm attained its peak intensity, with a central minimum pressure of 945 millibars (27.9 inHg) and maximum 10-minute sustained winds of 140 km/h (85 mph), according to the JMA. The JTWC reported the storm to be slightly stronger, with maximum 1-minute winds peaking at 150 km/h (90 mph), the equivalent of a Category 1 hurricane on the Saffir–Simpson Hurricane Scale. Morakot's forward motion slowed, and the storm weakened slightly before making landfall in central Taiwan later that day, as a severe tropical storm. Roughly 24 hours later, the storm emerged back over water into the Taiwan Strait and turned northward, before making landfall in mainland China on August 9, as a severe tropical storm. The storm gradually weakened as it continued to slowly track inland, with the storm's forward motion gradually increasing, with the system eventually turning northeastward on August 11. Later that day, Morakot degenerated into a remnant low in the East China Sea, before making landfall on South Korea early on the next day, and then making another landfall on northern Japan on August 13. The remnants of the typhoon dissipated shortly afterward.

== Preparations ==
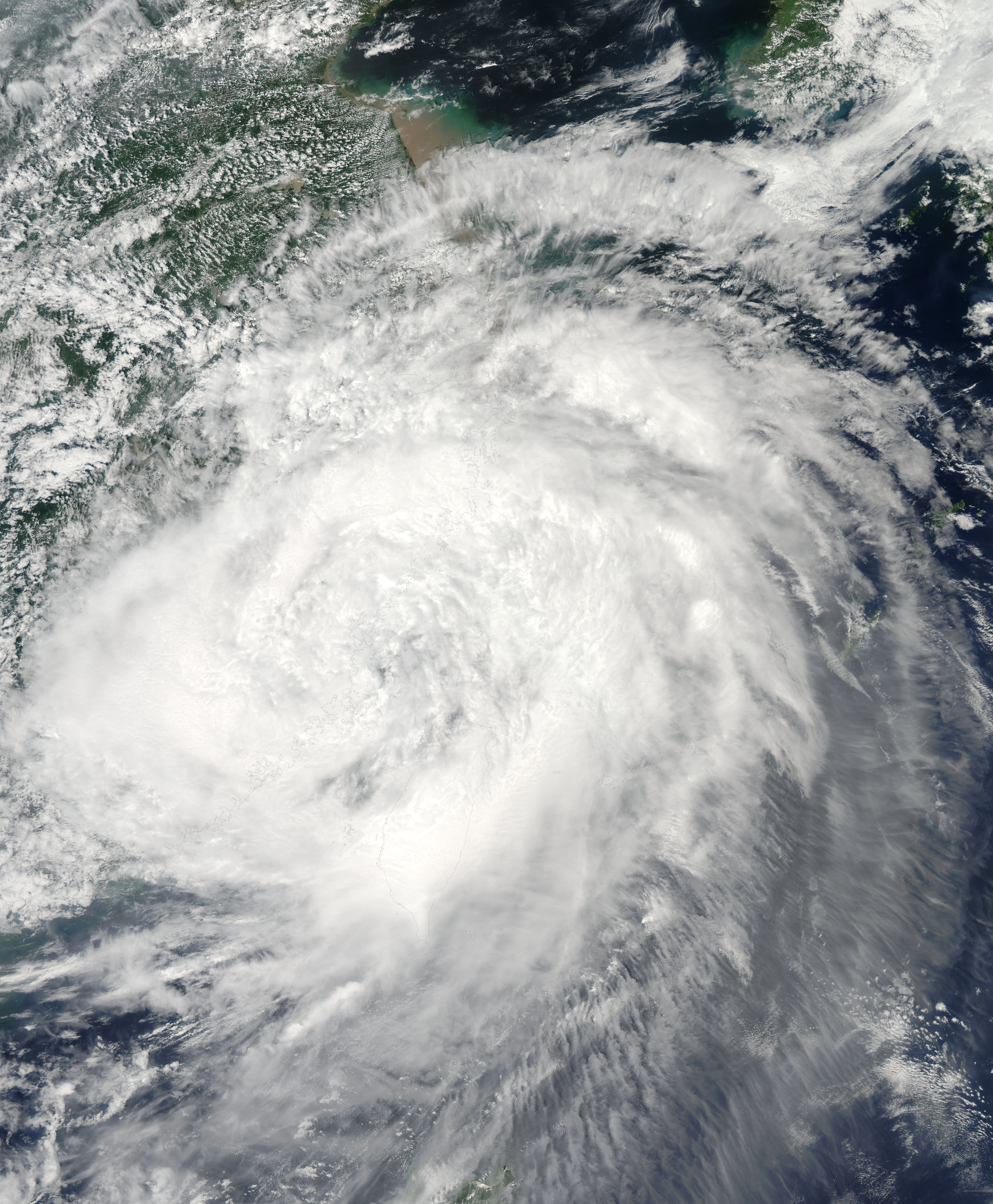
Tropical Storm Morakot over eastern China on August 9

=== Japan ===
At 0000 UTC on August 3, the JMA placed the Moji and Yokohama navtex areas under a gale warning, six hours later they also placed the Naha navtex area under a gale warning. Later that day at 1800 UTC, the JMA canceled the gale warnings for the Yokohama navtex area however at 0600 UTC the next morning the gale warning for Yokohama was reissued. The JMA kept these warnings in force before they were upgraded to a typhoon warnings as Morakot intensified into a typhoon on August 5. Early the next day, US military installations on Okinawa raised their Tropical Cyclone Condition of Readiness (TCCOR) from level 4 to level 3 which meant that winds exceeding 50 knots (93 km/h, 57 mph) were expected to affect Okinawa within 48 hours. This came as the JMA canceled the warning for Yokohama.

=== Philippines ===
From their first warning, PAGASA warned that the depression was expected to “enhance the Southwest Monsoon and bring occasional heavy rain over Luzon and Western Visayas”. However, early on August 6, they placed the Batanes in Northern Luzon under Public Storm Warning Signal 1 (PSWS 1), which meant that winds of up to 35 kn (65 km/h) were expected in Batanes within 36 hours. They then placed Northern Cagayan, Apayao, Ilocos, and Norte under PSWS 1 later that day, as it moved toward Taiwan. They kept these warnings in place until early on August 8, when they revised the warnings downgrading the signal for Northern Cagayan, Apayao, Ilocos and Norte, while putting Babuyan and Calayan Islands under PSWS 1 and then early the next day PAGASA released their final warning and downgrade all signals for the Philippines.

=== Taiwan ===
- August 5, 2009: 20:30, the Central Weather Bureau of Taiwan issued a Sea Typhoon Alert for Morakot.
- August 6, 2009: Severe Tropical Storm Morakot intensified into a typhoon.
- August 7, 2009: Morakot was closing in on Taiwan. It moved very slowly and it made landfall just before midnight.
- August 8, 2009: After midnight, most of the districts in south Taiwan recorded heavy rainfall.

=== China ===
More than 953,000 residents and more than 35,000 boats were evacuated back to shore in the eastern and southeastern provinces of the People's Republic of China. A fishing boat capsized with nine fishermen missing. In all, roughly 1.5 million residents were evacuated ahead of the typhoon. A total of 34,000 watercraft sought refuge ahead of the storm.

== Impact ==
=== Japan ===
On Thursday August 6, shortly after midday, Morakot lashed Okinawa-Honto with wind gusts as high as 65 mph (105 km/h), stranding thousands of summer holiday air travelers. Naha Airport experienced east crosswinds of 50 mph (80 km/h) which almost completely shut down the airport. Domestic and international airlines reported 252 flights canceled, stranding 41,648 passengers at the peak of the summer Obon holidays. Some Kadena-based U.S. aircraft were evacuated ahead of Morakot. The southernmost island groups of Yaeyama, including Yonaguni and Ishigaki, were affected by gale- or storm-force winds.

=== Philippines ===
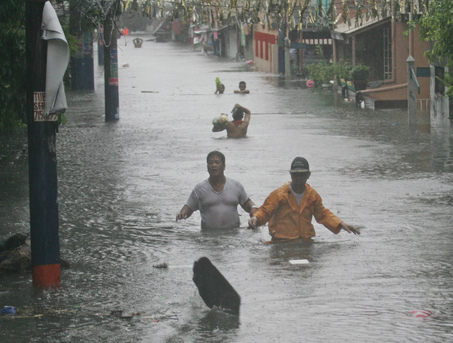
Flooding in the Philippines

In the Philippines, eleven villages (Pagudpod, San Juan, Baton-lapoc, Carael, Tampo, Paco, San Miguel, Bining, Bangan, and Capayawan) were submerged in 4-to-5-foot-deep (1.2 to 1.5 m) floods after the Pinatubo Dike overflowed around 4:00 p.m. on August 6, 2009. Joint military and police rescue teams rescued 3 Koreans and 9 Canadian nationals. About 29,000 people were affected by Morakot; nine people were confirmed dead. Three French tourists and two Filipino guides were killed in a flash flood caused by a landslide. Thousands were trapped on rooftops or in trees awaiting helicopter rescue attempts and thousands lost their homes. At least two people died due to flooding. Landslides claimed the lives of no less than twelve miners after a mine caved in. Schools suspended their classes in the hardest hit area, and highways closed due to landslides.

=== Taiwan ===
The coast of Keelung, Taiwan, where schools were closed ahead of the typhoon, Morakot caused landslides, severe floods, blew down trees and billboards, and stripped roofs from buildings.

After Morakot landed at midnight on August 8, almost the entire southern region of Taiwan (Chiayi County/Chiayi City, Tainan County/Tainan City (now merged as Tainan), Kaohsiung County/Kaohsiung City (now merged as Kaohsiung), and Pingtung County) and parts of Taitung County and Nantou County were flooded by record-breaking heavy rain. The rainfall in Pingtung County exceeded 2,600 millimetres (100 in), breaking all rainfall records of any single place in Taiwan induced by a single typhoon. Airlines in Taiwan did hold some flights in and out of airports, but seaports were closed. Electricity supplies were cut to approximately 25,000 homes.

Siaolin Village, a mountain village with 1,300 residents in Jiasian Township, was buried by a massive landslide (and subsequent flood) that destroyed the town, and resulted in 465 deaths. It was reported that all roads toward Namasia Township were either blocked or washed away by severe mudflows. Hundreds of residents were trapped for four days, and were running out of food and water. In addition, water and electricity had been cut. Other affected areas included the Taimali River mouth, the Zhiben River catchment, the Gaoping River bridge linking Linyuan and Xinyuan townships at the boundary between Kaohsiung and Pingtung counties, and several catchments in Pingtung County where the rivers flow into the Taiwan Strait. A rescue helicopter, working to retrieve survivors of the mudflow crashed into a mountain side early on August 11, killing the three occupants. Crews were unable to reach the wreckage due to the steep terrain.

A swollen river in Taitung County undermined 51 homes and swept them away into the Pacific, leaving numerous residents homeless. No people were in the homes when they collapsed into the river. In the famous Zhiben Hot Springs area, the six-story Jinshuai Hotel was destroyed when it collapsed into the Zhiben River after being undermined by flood waters. Several stores in front of the hotel were washed away days earlier as the river continued to overflow its banks and inundate nearby towns and cities. Running water in Tainan County to 280,000 was shut down as flood waters contaminated the local reservoir. Twenty bridges were destroyed due to the typhoon, with eight being on a Provincial Highway. Seven of those on a highway were in Kaohsiung or Pingtung. Additionally, at least 16 landslide dams were formed during the typhoon. Most of the damage done to railways are located in the south on the Pingtung, Taitung, and South Link lines. Also, the Alishan Forest Railway saw some serious damage. According to the Ministry of Education, 1,273 schools were affected by the typhoon, accumulating a loss of NT$18.7 billion (US$568 million). The National Museum of Prehistory, National Science and Technology Museum, and Fonghuanggu Bird and Ecology Park were all damaged by the typhoon.

According to statistics of the Morakot Post‐Disaster Reconstruction Council up to February 4, 2010, the disaster resulted in 677 deaths, 4 severely injured, and 22 missing persons, as well as an additional 25 bodies that were not identified: a total of 728 persons (cases). The record-breaking rains also caused catastrophic agricultural losses. At its peak, roughly 1.58 million were without power across the island and over 710,000 were without water pressure. Tourism losses due to the typhoon were estimated to be at least NT$800 million (US$24.3 million). The Council of Agriculture estimates that a total of NT$19.2 billion (US$586 million) was lost due to the typhoon, making it the second-costliest typhoon behind Typhoon Herb in 1996. Out of this, farms lost NT$12.9 billion, fisheries lost NT$4.7 billion, and livestock lost NT$1.62 billion.

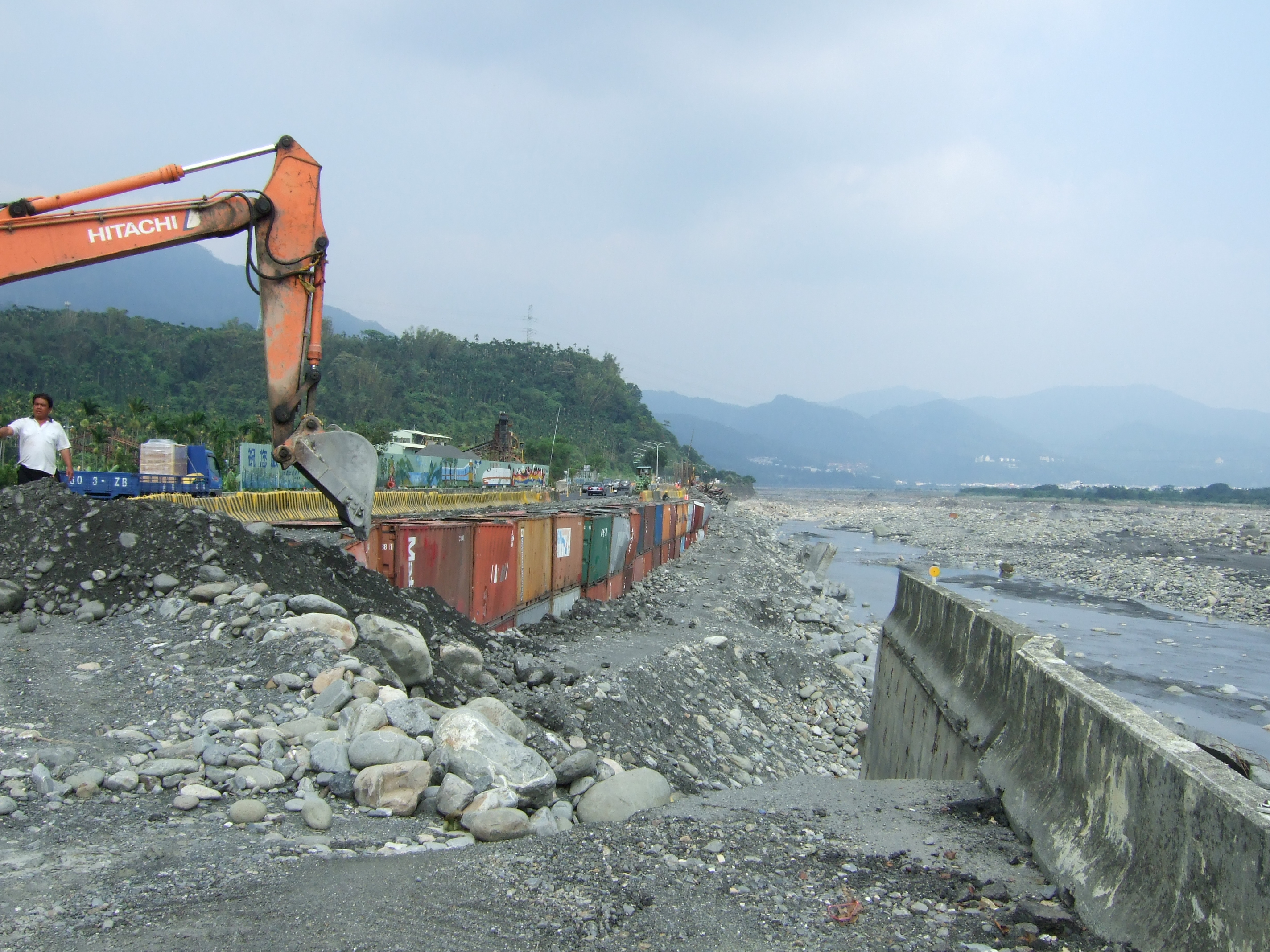
Provincial Highway 16 collapsed, causing seven cars to be washed into the Zhuoshui River.

However, Morakot also ended a month-long drought and replenished reservoirs enough to warrant an end to water rationing. Typhoon Morakot caused Zengwen Reservoir, which was originally short on water, to suddenly exceed capacity. In response to the excess water, the reservoir released over 100,000,000 liters of water, which is about 80% of the dam's total capacity. The release of water caused severe flooding along the Zengwen River; in Xiaobei Village in Madou Township, the water level reached a story high.

The "Little Three Links" between Kinmen of the Republic of China and Xiamen of the People's Republic of China was suspended. Almost all reservoirs in Kinmen County were full. Winds at Force 13 on the Beaufort scale were recorded in the Matsu Islands.

National Disaster Prevention and Protection Commission is the task-force-grouped committee authorized by the law of Disaster Prevention and Protection.

==== Nantou County ====
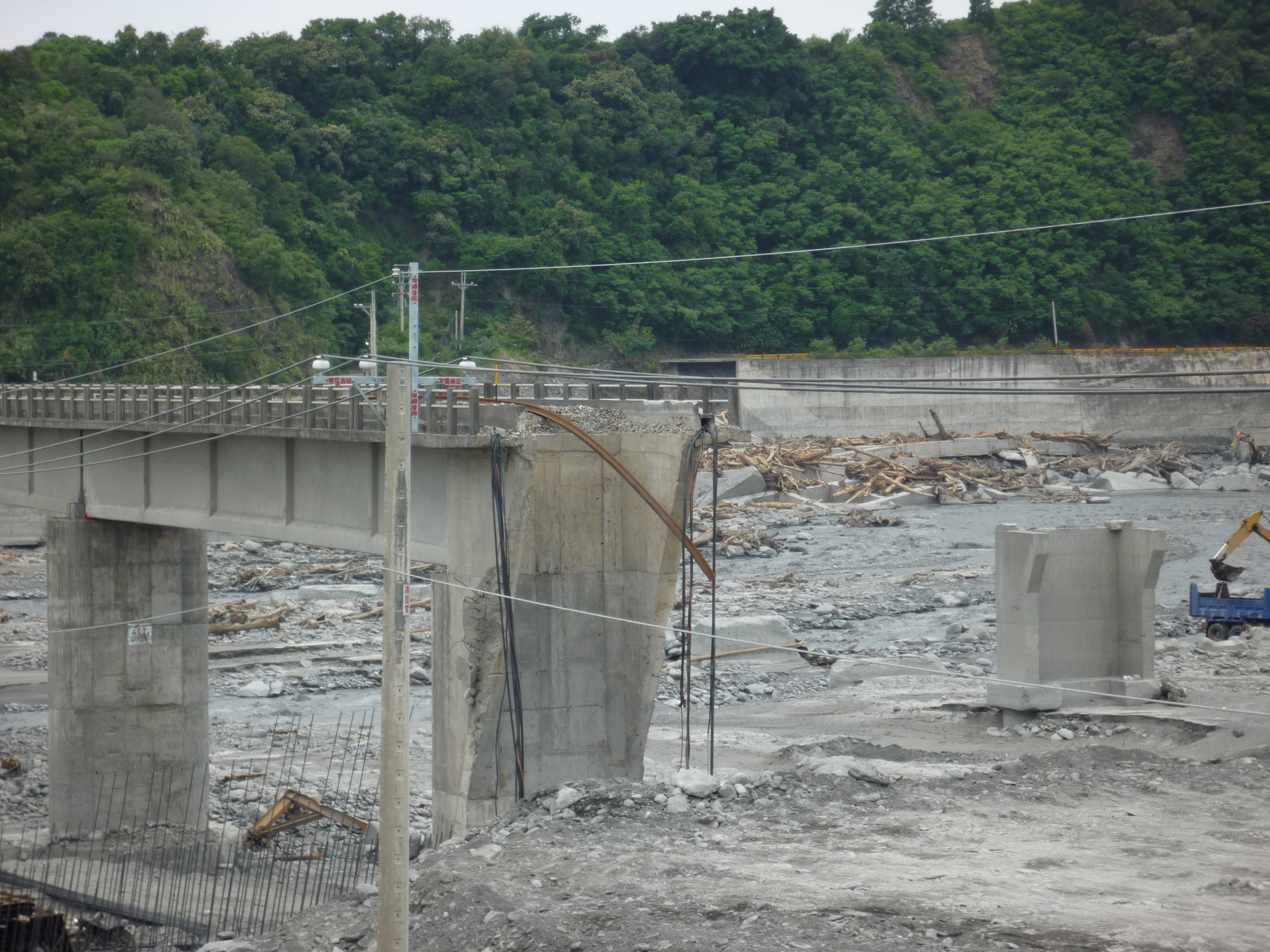
A broken bridge on the TRA South-link line in Taimali Township.

The most damage done to Nantou County was in Xinyi, which had the greatest rainfall in the county. The currents of the Chenyoulan River caused the foundations of roads and buildings to be wiped away. A building in Longhua Elementary School tilted 30 degrees as a result of the foundations being washed away and was on the verge of falling into the river.

Provincial Highway 16 collapsed between Jiji and Shuili, causing seven cars to be washed into the Zhuoshui River. So far, only four out of fifteen bodies have been recovered.

==== Kaohsiung County ====
Kaohsiung County saw over 2,500 millimeters of rainfall within three days (Kaohsiung typically receives the same amount of rain in a year). The rain brought severe floods on the plains and landslides in the mountains. On August 14, Xiaolin Village was completely covered due to a landslide, causing the deaths of 398 people.

Due to the rain, many bridges were washed away, including those on Provincial Highways 20, 21, and 27 and the bridge to the Maolin National Scenic Area. 14 people went missing after a weir under construction was washed away.

==== Pingtung County ====
Pingtung County is one of the areas hardest hit by the typhoon. Due to the collapse of embankment along the Linbian River, there was severe flooding in Linbian and Jiadong, with Jiadong reporting flood depths of two stories. Embankments along the Laonong River also collapsed, causing flooding in Gaoshu. A bridge on Provincial Highway 24 collapsed, effectively cutting off Wutai Township from the rest of the country.

According to the Water Resources Agency, the area with the highest rainfall was in Wanluan Township with 135 millimeters per hour. The total highest rainfall was recorded in Sandimen Township with over 2500 millimeters.

The railways in Pingtung also took a huge hit, with the Pingtung Line taking 6 months to repair. Linbian Train Station's train tracks were entirely covered in mud after severe flooding there.

==== Taitung County ====
Most of the flooding in Taitung County occurred in the south part of the county, with Daren, Taimali, and Dawu Townships being especially hard hit.

Flooding was especially serious in Zhiben Hot Springs, with 200 meters of its main road washed away. On August 9, the Jinshuai Hotel's (金帥溫泉大飯店) foundations were washed away, and the eight-story hotel toppled over into the Zhiben River. Soon afterward, the top three floors of the hotel were washed away.

The TRA South Link Line was also hard hit, with two of its bridges being washed away in Taimali Township. The Taimali River also flooded, destroying a large portion of Taihe Village in Taimali.

==== Other counties ====
In Chiayi County, embankments along the Bazhang and Puzi rivers collapsed, causing flooding in Puzi Township. Since the coastal areas are lower in elevation, there was also widespread flooding in Dongshi, Budai, and Yizhu. Many villages in Alishan, Meishan, Zhuqi townships saw flooding and destruction done to their infrastructure. The Alishan Forest Railway saw some serious damage, and repairs took about a year.

Central and North Taiwan saw some less severe flooding, with the most serious in Dacheng and Erlin in Changhua County.

=== China ===
During a four-day span, Morakot produced up to 1,240 mm (49 in) of rain in Zhejiang province, the highest total in nearly 60 years in the province. A landslide in Pengxi, at the foot of a mountain, destroyed a three-story apartment building, with six people inside. All six were recovered from the rubble of the structure. However, two later died of their injuries. In Wenzhou, a large landslide destroyed six apartment buildings, burying an unknown number of people, some of whom were feared dead. One person was killed after torrential rains caused the house he was in to collapse, as well as four other nearby homes.

In Xiapu county, the location of Morakot's landfall in China, 136,000 people reported damage to their homes from flooding or landslides. The fishing sector of the local industry sustained roughly 200 million yuan (US$29 million) in losses. Fourteen townships in the county were flooded. An estimated 3.4 million people reported property damage throughout Zhejiang province, with at least 1,600 homes being destroyed. At least 10,000 homes were damaged or destroyed by the storm and over 1 million acres (4,000 km^{2}) of farmland was inundated by flooding. In China, damages from the storm amounted to $1.4 billion. Over 11 million people were affected by Typhoon Morakot throughout eastern China.

=== Oil deliveries ===
The typhoon has resulted in some identifiable but limited impact on oil deliveries to East Asian destinations. At least two fuel oil cargoes in East China were delayed due to Typhoon Morakot. This included 90,000-mt Venezuelan fuel oil cargo with Zhoushan in Zhejiang Province. There was a report that an 18,000-mt cargo of Singapore-origin with fuel oil on board for an August 10 delivery into Zhangjiagang in Jiangsu Province was postponed to August 15.

Many ports in East China were closed from August 8, including Waigaoqiao, Jinshan and Yangshan ports in Shanghai, Zhoushan and Ningbo ports in Zhejiang, Zhangjiagang, Nantong and Jiangyin ports in Jiangsu.

== Aftermath ==
=== Taiwan ===
Wettest tropical cyclones and their remnants in Taiwan Highest-known totals
Precipitation			Storm	Location	Ref.
Rank	mm	in	Storm	Location	Ref.
1	3,060	120.47	Morakot 2009	Alishan, Chiayi	
2	2,319	91.30	Nari 2001	Wulai, New Taipei	
3	2,162	85.12	Flossie 1969	Beitou, Taipei	
4	1,987	78.23	Herb 1996	Alishan, Chiayi	
5	1,933	76.10	Gaemi 2024	Maolin, Kaoshiung	
6	1,774	69.84	Saola 2012	Yilan City	
7	1,725	67.91	Krathon 2024	Beinan, Taitung	
8	1,700	66.93	Lynn 1987	Taipei	
9	1,672	65.83	Clara 1967	Dongshan, Yilan	
10	1,611	63.43	Sinlaku 2008	Heping, Taichung	

After the typhoon, search-and-rescue teams were eventually deployed throughout Taiwan in response to numerous landslides and flash flooding. Helicopters were rushed to Siaolin to retrieve as many residents as possible and transport them to shelters. By August 11, nearly 300 residents were confirmed to have been moved to safety. During the afternoon, one helicopter crashed into a mountainside while carrying three crew members. All three crew members died. Continuing standards set up after the 1999 Jiji earthquake, the Government of Taiwan provided NT$1 million for each family member killed or missing and NT$250,000 for the critically injured.

The military was dispatched with responding to the disasters all around the country with transporting food and aid around. After the typhoon, soldiers were also used in cleanup and rebuilding. An estimated 15,815 soldiers were used in total. With the assistance of firefighters and policemen, an estimated 41,752 people were rescued. Due to the severity of the damage in Siaolin access to the area was restricted to military personnel only. Major-General Richard Hu said it is still too early to state how many villagers had been buried, military rescuers just know that 90% of the homes of the three villages were buried by the landslide.

On August 15, the Executive Yuan formed the "Typhoon Morakot Rebuilding Committee". The 37 person committee was given a budget of NT$116.5 million to rebuild infrastructure and economic losses. The committee has built 3,481 permanent housing units in 40 locations and repaired most damaged roads. However, there was controversy surrounding the relocation of people to these new housing units. The Executive Yuan announced that all flags be placed at half-mast in mourning between August 22 and 24.

After the flooding, many organizations began raising money for rebuilding in areas affected by the typhoon. Special programs were aired on national TV to fundraise. Additionally, a fundraising festival named "Spread the Love" was held, featuring prominent TV personalities Matilda Tao, Chang Hsiao-yen, and Shen Chun-hua. The event lasted for 7 hours and was aired on national TV and raised NT$500 million. Many large corporations also donated money to the cause, including Chi Mei, Evergreen, Delta Electronics, Foxconn, Formosa Plastics, TSMC, Cathay United Bank, and Asus. The Chunghua Post released a special edition stamp, with all proceeds going to helping rebuild.

President Ma Ying-jeou and his administration have been criticised because of the slow response to Typhoon Morakot. The government was initially found to have rejected foreign aid, then to have quickly reversed that decision in response to criticism, citing that the rejection was only temporary. Vice Foreign Minister Andrew Hsia has tendered his resignation for authorizing Taiwan's diplomats to turn down foreign aid, a decision done without the consent of more senior officials.

Immediately after the typhoon, large civilian and military search-and-rescue operations were deployed. Helicopters were sent to numerous mountain villages, including Siaolin, in an attempt to rescue locals who were unable to escape by foot. It was discovered that almost 400 people had vanished, and are presumed to have been buried alive when a massive mudflow wiped out 90 per cent of the village's homes. Similar stories have been reported from other small villages in the vicinity of this region.

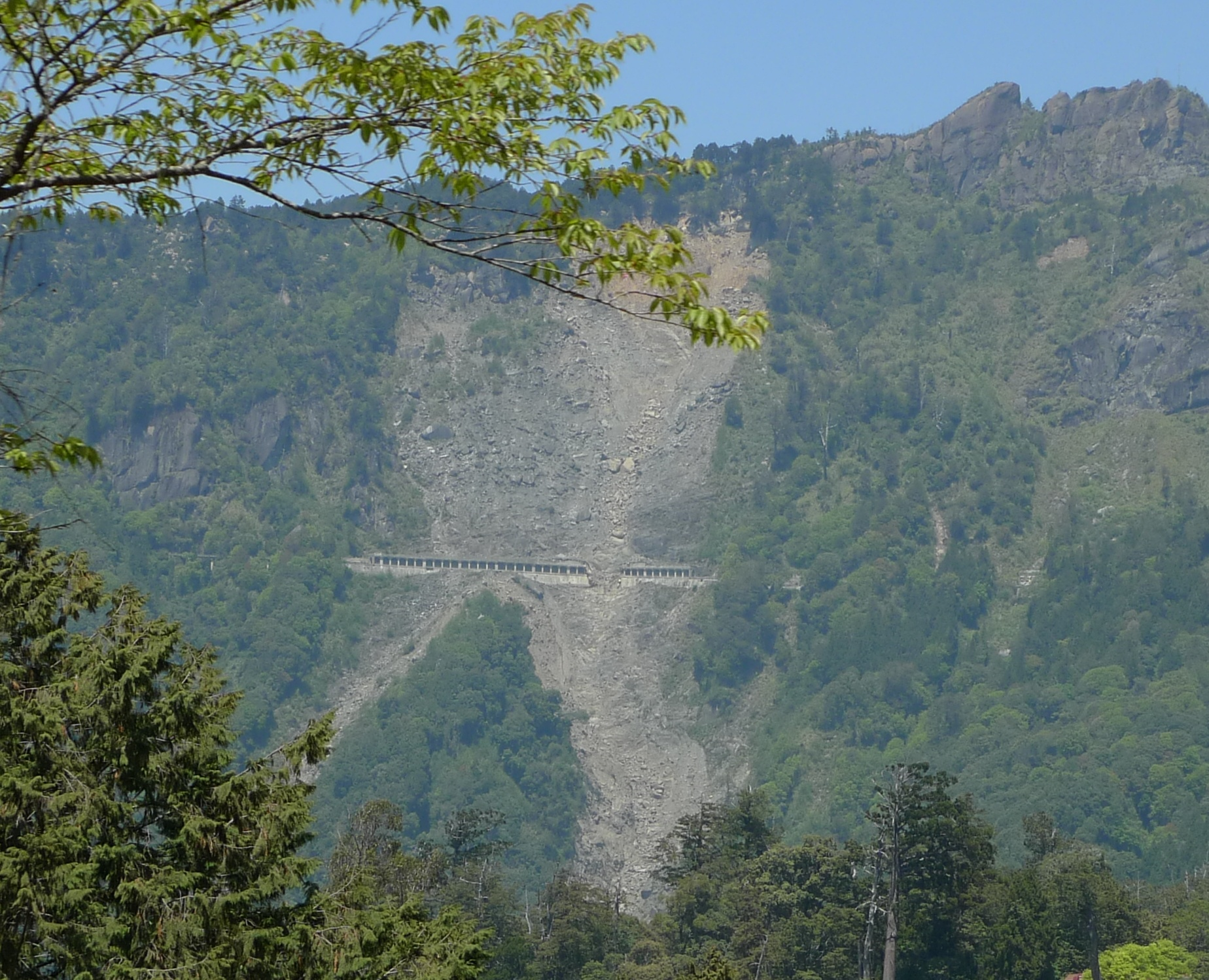
A portion of the damaged Alishan Forest Railway pictured in April 2010

The record-breaking rains also caused catastrophic agricultural losses, with estimates reaching NT$14.59 billion (US$443 million).

Fund raising shows such as Artistes 88 Fund Raising Campaign were held in Taiwan and Hong Kong.

Taiwanese aborigines protested against the 14th Dalai Lama during his visit to Taiwan after Typhoon Morakot and denounced it as politically motivated.

The government relocated several Rukai villages following the damage to southern Taiwan. This mandated move threatened Rukai culture and prompted Rukai groups to begin community-based conservation programs to help local Rukai communities assert sovereignty over traditional lands.

The Association for Relations Across the Taiwan Straits donated c. CN¥450 million (c. NT$2 billion) to rebuild. They specified that NT$150 million be used on building 500 units of recovery housing and NT$1.7 billion be used on rebuilding infrastructure. The Mainland Affairs Council estimated that around NT$4 billion was donated by China. Also, around NT$130 million was donated by Taiwanese companies in China.

The Xiaolin Village Memorial Park was opened in January 2012 to commemorate the village victims from the typhoon.

=== Philippines ===
The World Vision organization reported that they distributed roughly 40 gallons of water to 800 people. The National Disaster Coordinating Council declared a state of calamity for the Zambales region, as over 13,000 people were left homeless.

== Retirement ==
Due to the extensive damage and deaths caused by the storm, the name Morakot was later retired. The committee selected the name Atsani to replace "Morakot" on the Western Pacific basin name lists beginning in 2011, and was first used in the 2015 season.

== See also ==
- Tropical cyclones in 2009
- List of the wettest tropical cyclones
- Typhoon Haitang (2005)
- Typhoon Fanapi (2010)
- Typhoon Saola (2012)
- Tropical Storm Trami (2013)
- Typhoon Soudelor (2015)
