= Qishan =

Qishan may refer to:

== Places in China ==
- Qishan County (岐山县), of Baoji, Shaanxi
- Qishan, Qimen County (祁山镇), town in Qimen County, Anhui
- Qishan, Li County (祁山乡), township in Li County, Gansu
- Qishan, Pei County (栖山镇), town in Pei County, Jiangsu
- Qishan, Ju County (棋山镇), town in Ju County, Shandong
- Qishan, Zhaoyuan (齐山镇), town in Zhaoyuan City, Shandong
- Qishan (Hunan) (祁山), mountain in Hunan
- Qishan (Gansu) (祁山), mountain in Gansu

== Place in Taiwan ==
- Cishan District (Qishan; 旗山區), Kaohsiung, Taiwan

== People ==
- Qishan (official) (琦善), Qing Dynasty official

== See also ==
- Chishan
