= Xiaolin Village Memorial Park =

Memorial park in Jaxian, Kaohsiung, Taiwan

- 小林村紀念公園
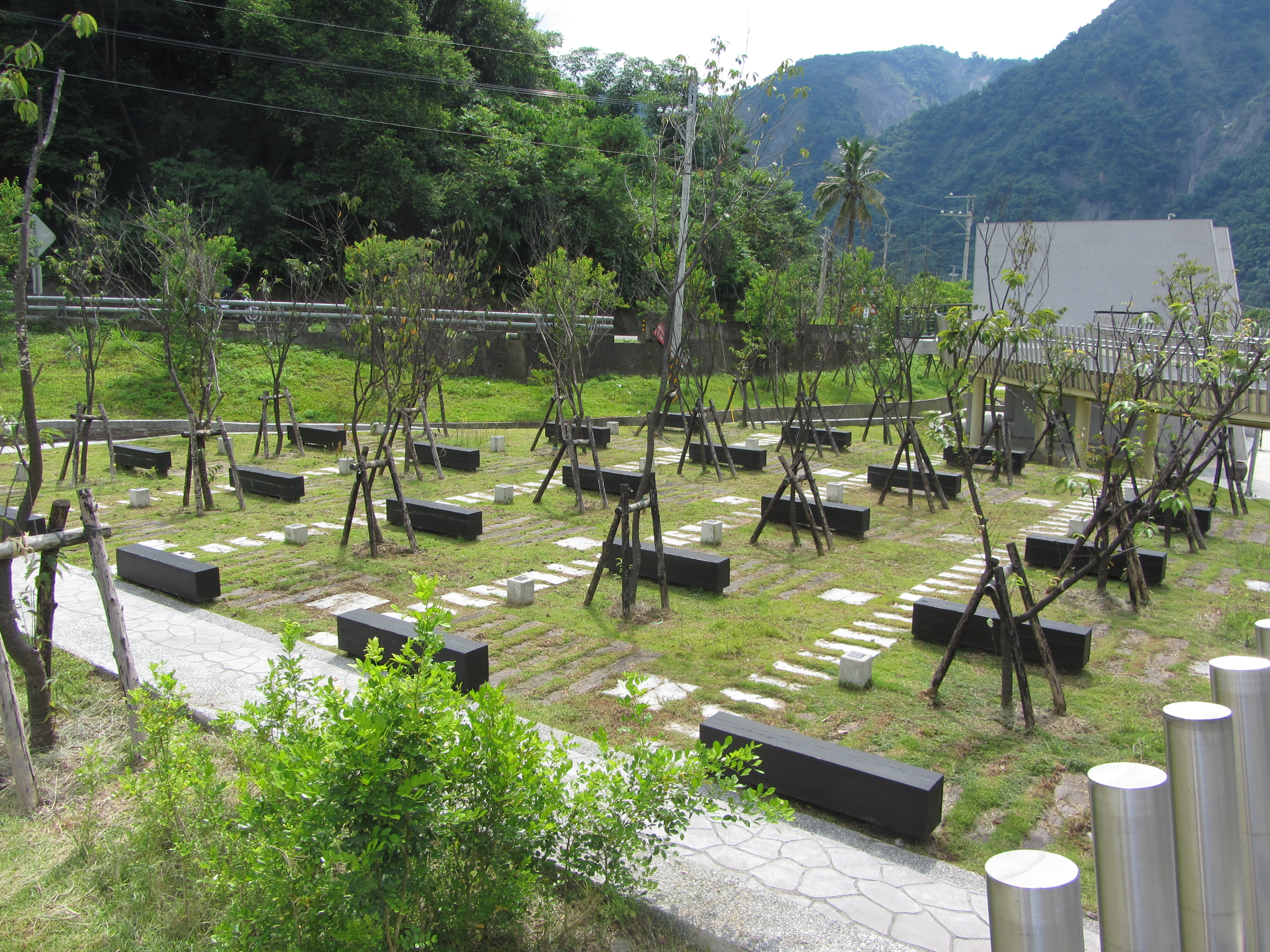
- Interactive map of Xiaolin Village Memorial Park

Details
- Established: 15 January 2012
- Location: Jiasian, Kaohsiung, Taiwan
- Coordinates: 23°09′17.6″N 120°38′24.8″E
- Type: memorial park
- Size: 1.7 hectares

The Xiaolin Village Memorial Park (traditional Chinese: 小林村紀念公園; simplified Chinese: 小林村纪念公园; pinyin: Xiǎolín Cūn Jìniàn Gōngyuán) is a memorial park in Siaolin Village, Jiasian District, Kaohsiung, Taiwan. The park commemorates victims of the Typhoon Morakot in 2009.

== History ==
In the aftermath of Typhoon Morakot, Magistrate Yang Chiu-hsing proposed the establishment of a memorial park to commemorate the victims buried in landslide cause by the typhoon. The memorial park was officiated on 15 January 2012 during a ceremony attended by President Ma Ying-jeou, Mayor Chen Chu and Lin Join-sane.

== Architecture ==
The memorial park measures 1.7 hectares in area and includes an ancestral hall, bridge, memorial square, monument and viewing platform. There are 181 mountain cherry trees planted at the park, representing 181 families who were lost during the natural disaster. It features a 9-meter monument which was made from stones felt down during the landslide.

== See also ==
- List of tourist attractions in Taiwan
