= Zhiben Hot Spring =

Thermal spring in Taiwan

Coordinates: 22.693°N 121.013°E

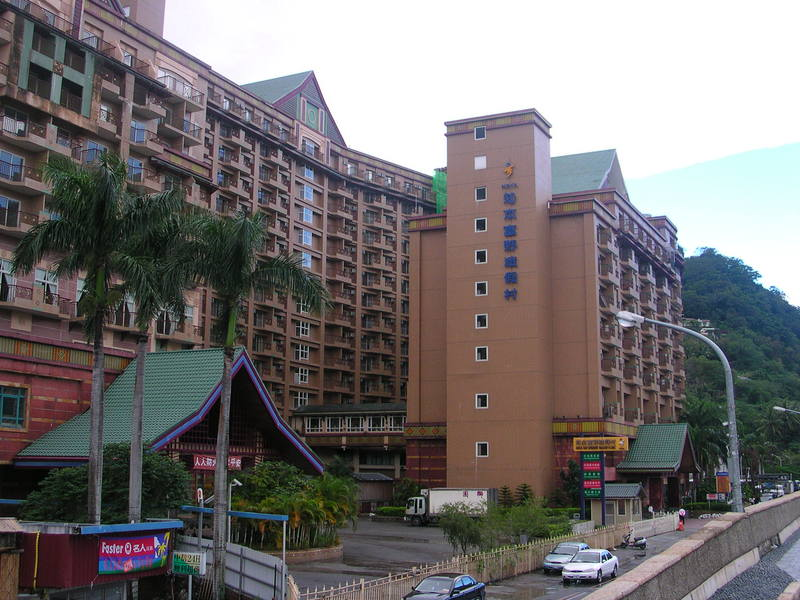
Zhiben Hot Spring

The Zhiben Hot Springs (Chinese: 知本溫泉; pinyin: Zhīběn Wēnquán; Wade–Giles: Chīh-pěn Wēn-ch'üán) are carbonic hot springs located in Beinan Township, Taitung County, Taiwan. The spring water is colorless and odorless, and its temperature can be higher than 100 degrees Celsius. The Zhiben Hot Springs are of high quality and among the most renowned in Taiwan.

== History ==
Zhiben were the earliest hot springs to be developed in Taitung County. They were first discovered by the Puyuma people, the earliest inhabitants of the area, who learned of its health benefits firsthand. The Puyuma dug trenches, filled them with spring water, and enjoyed a relaxing time after a day of hunting or hard work. During Japanese rule, the government set up public bathhouses in Zhiben using spring water. After the Retrocession of Taiwan in 1945, several hot spring hotels were opened in the area and the beneficial effects of hot spring baths promoted, making Zhiben one of the most popular and well-known hot spring areas in Taiwan.

On 8 August 2009, Zhiben was badly hit by Typhoon Morakot and made international news headlines when an eyewitness filmed the collapse of a riverside hotel undermined by flood waters. However, Zhiben's infrastructure was very rapidly restored and the main spas were once more operational and easily accessible from Taitung City.

== Transport ==
Zhiben can be reached by taking the train to the Zhiben Station of Taiwan Railway.
