= Ming Shan Resort =

Resort in Lugu, Nantou County, Taiwan

- 溪頭明山森林會館
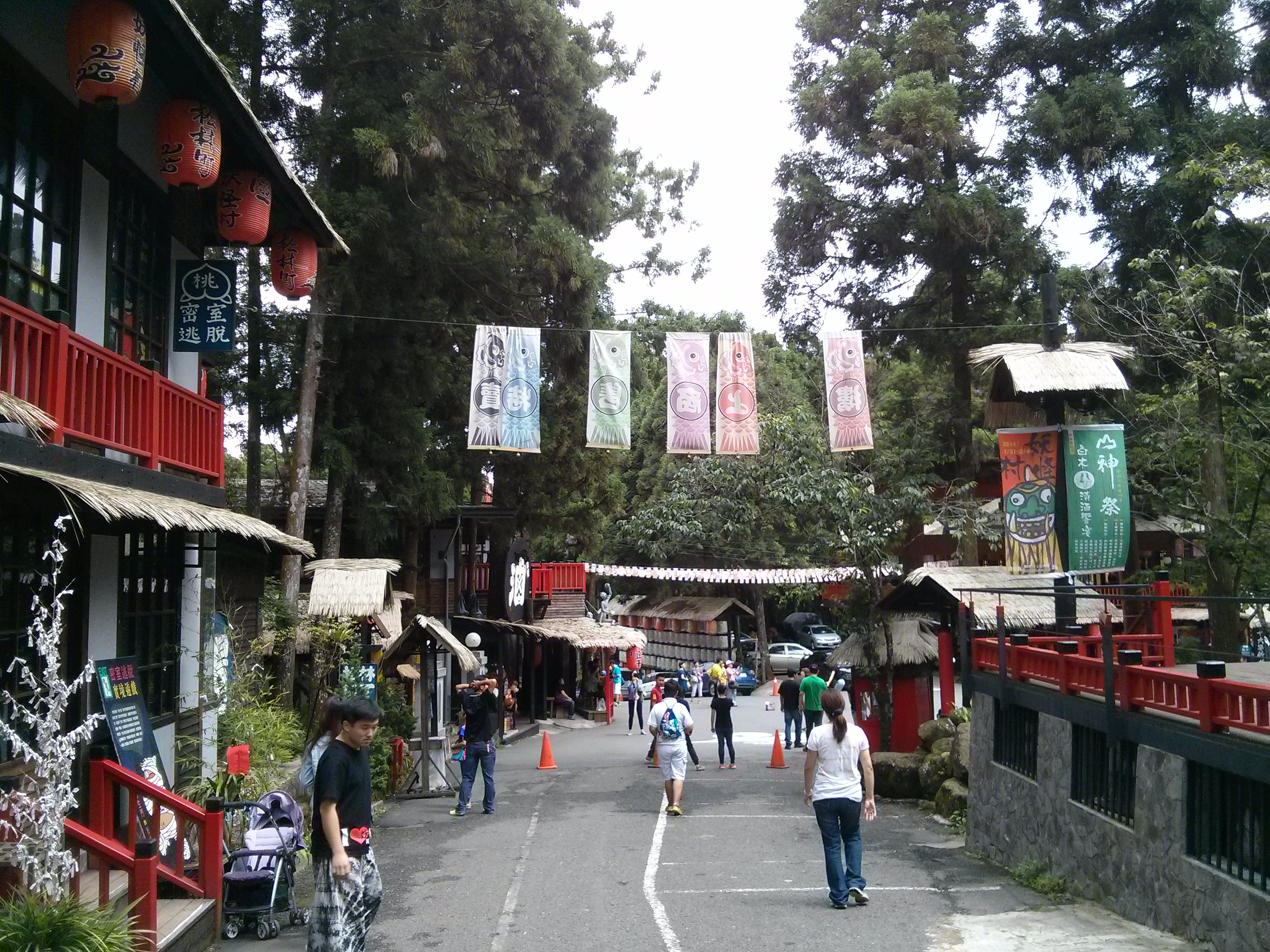
- Interactive map of the Ming Shan Resort area

General information
- Location: Lugu, Nantou County, Taiwan
- Coordinates: 23°40′27″N 120°47′50″E

Website
- Official website

The Ming Shan Resort (traditional Chinese: 溪頭明山森林會館; simplified Chinese: 溪头明山森林会馆; pinyin: Xītóu Míngshān Sēnlín Huìguǎn) is a tourist attraction resort in Lugu Township, Nantou County, Taiwan. The resort houses the Xitou Monster Village (Chinese: 溪頭妖怪村; pinyin: Xītóu Yāoguài Cūn).

== See also ==
- List of tourist attractions in Taiwan
