= Jiasian District =

District in Kaohsiung, Taiwan

Coordinates: 23°05′N 120°35′E

Jiasian 甲仙區 Jiaxian
- District
- Jiasian District
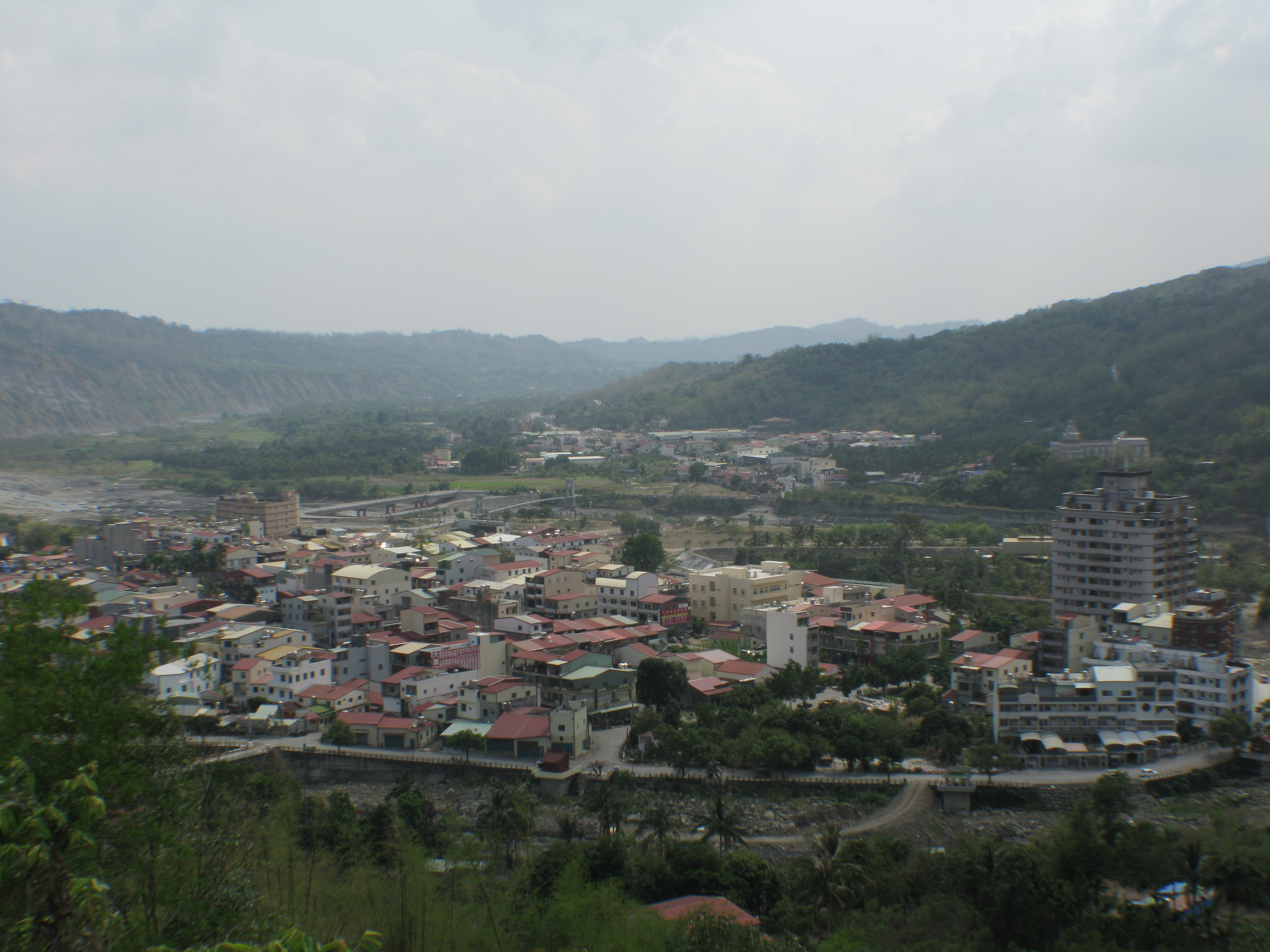

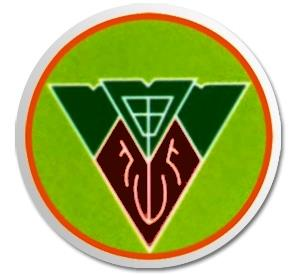
- Seal 高雄市甲仙區公所; Jiasian District Office, Kaohsiung City

- Jiasian District in Kaohsiung City
- Country: Taiwan
- Region: Southern Taiwan

Population (October 2023)
  - Total: 5,581
- Website: jiasian-en.kcg.gov.tw

Jiasian District (Chinese: 甲仙區; Hanyu Pinyin: Jiǎxiān Qū; Tongyong Pinyin: Jiǎsian Cyu; Wade–Giles: Chia^{3}-hsien^{1} Ch'ü^{1}) is a rural district in Kaohsiung City, Taiwan. Located far from the coast, the township is regarded as a gateway to Taiwan's Central Mountain Range.

== History ==
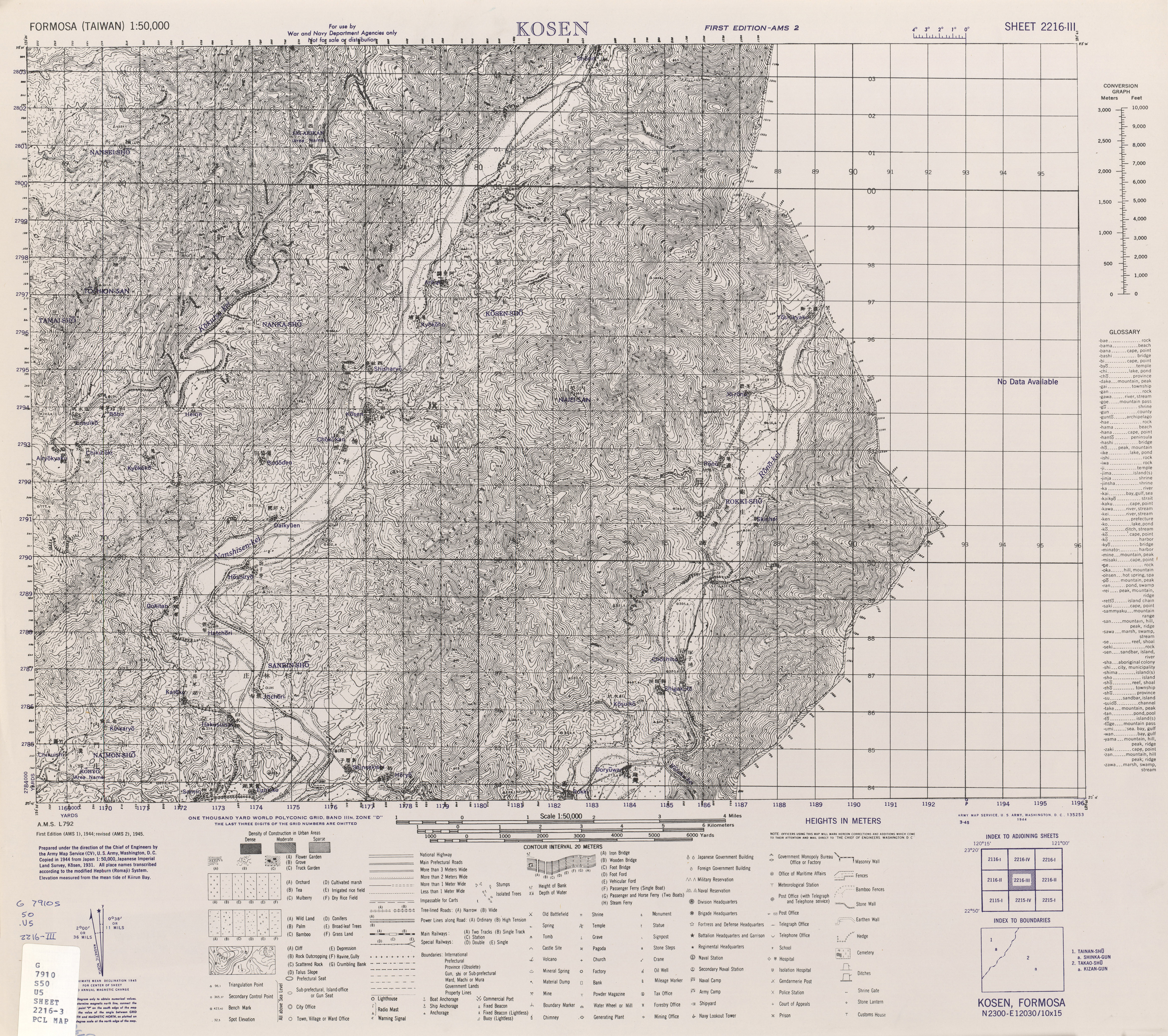
Map of the region including Jiasian (labeled as Kōsen 甲仙) (1944)

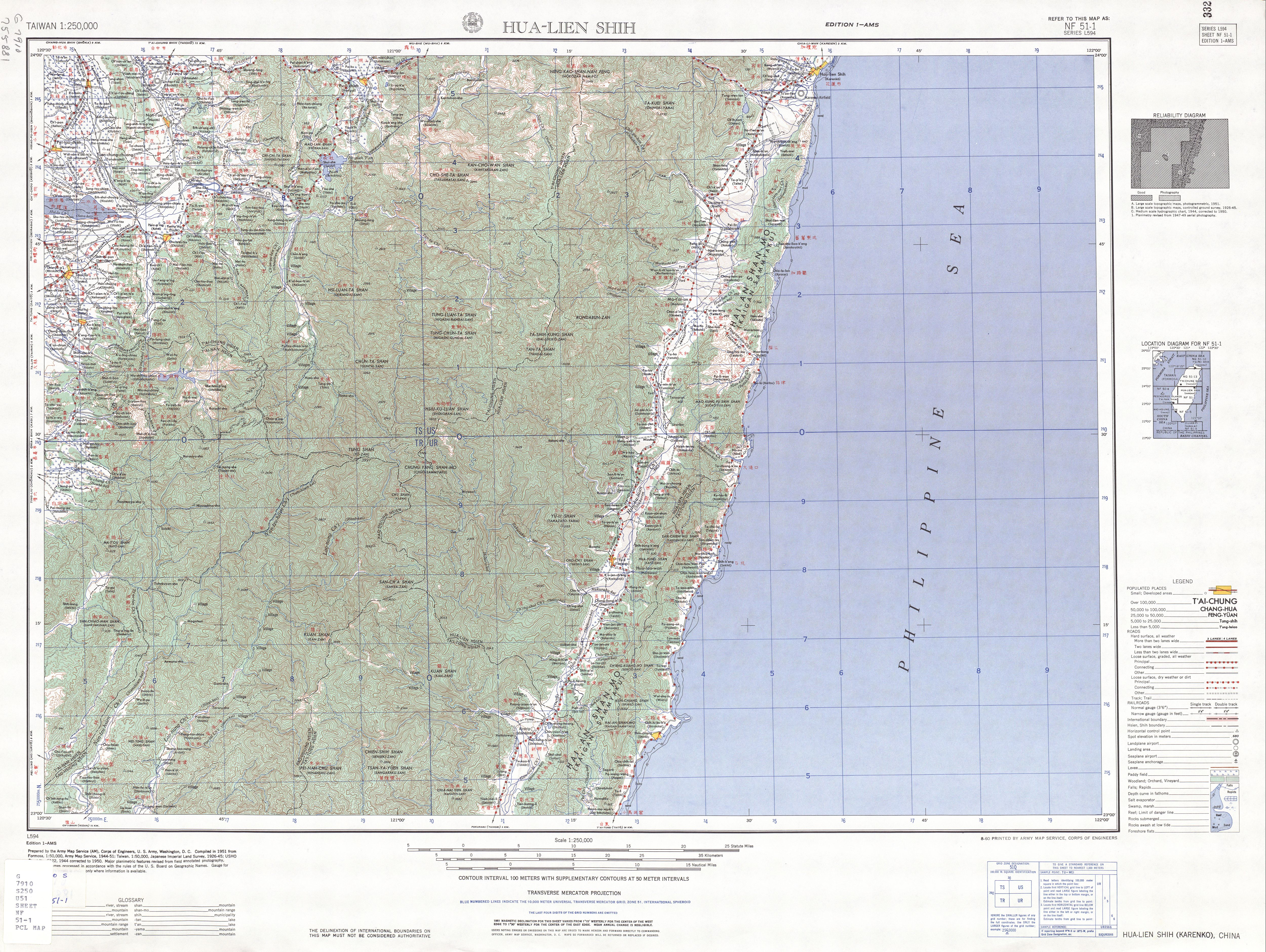
Map of the region including Jiasian (labeled as Chia-hsien (Kōsen) 甲仙) (1951)

=== Qing Dynasty ===
During the reign of Qianlong Emperor of Qing Dynasty, there was a person named Jiasian who came to the area to develop the land. Later on, people from Fujian and Guangdong migrated there to settle down. The government also established an office in the area for administration purpose.

=== Empire of Japan ===
After the handover of Taiwan from Qing Dynasty to Empire of Japan in 1895, the government established Aliguan police station in the area and applied police presence in 1902. In 1905, more than 2,000 Japanese people migrated to the area to work in camphor production by establishing Taiwan Camphor Production Enterprise. In 1920, the area was named Jiasian Village. Local and legislative offices were established including village chief and committee members. In 1942, tribal societies were further established in each village with one leader for each society.

=== Republic of China ===
After the handover of Taiwan from Japan to the Republic of China in 1945, Jiasian was organized as a rural township of Kaohsiung County. On 25 December 2010, Kaohsiung County was merged with Kaohsiung City and Jiasian was upgraded to a district of the city.

In August 2019, some residents living in high-risk areas of Jiasian District were evacuated from their homes after heavy rain and flash flooding.

== Geography ==
- Area: 124.03 km^{2}
- Population: 5,581 people (October 2023)

Much of the township is between 200 and 500 metres (660 and 1,640 feet) above sea level.

== Administrative divisions ==
- Baolong Village (寶隆里)
- Datian Village (大田里)
- Dong'an Village (東安里)
- Guanshan Village
- He'an Village (和安里)
- Xi'an Village (西安里)
- Siaolin Village (Xiaolin)

In Taiwan, "village" (里) is a level of administrative division that under a rural township. The main town of Jiasian is divided into three villages: Dong'an, Xi'an, and He'an.

== Economy ==
Situated at the intersection of Highway 20 (the Southern Cross-Island Highway) and Highway 21, Jiasian's downtown serves as a market center for local farmers and tourists. The most famous local crop is taro. Shops sell taro-flavored ice cream, taro cookies, and other taro products. The township is also known for its bamboo shoots and plums.

== Tourist attractions ==
- Cemetery of Zhenghaijun
- Jiaxian Bridge
- Jiasianpu Memorial Monument
- Jiasian Water Park
- Jiasian Petrified Fossil Museum
- Mount Baiyun
- Mount Liouyi
- Mount Neiying
- Mount Waiying
- Mount Zion (Chinese: 錫安山; pinyin: Xí'an Shan), a Christian hamlet.
- Xiaolin Pingpu Cultural Museum
- Xiaolin Village Memorial Park

== Transportation ==
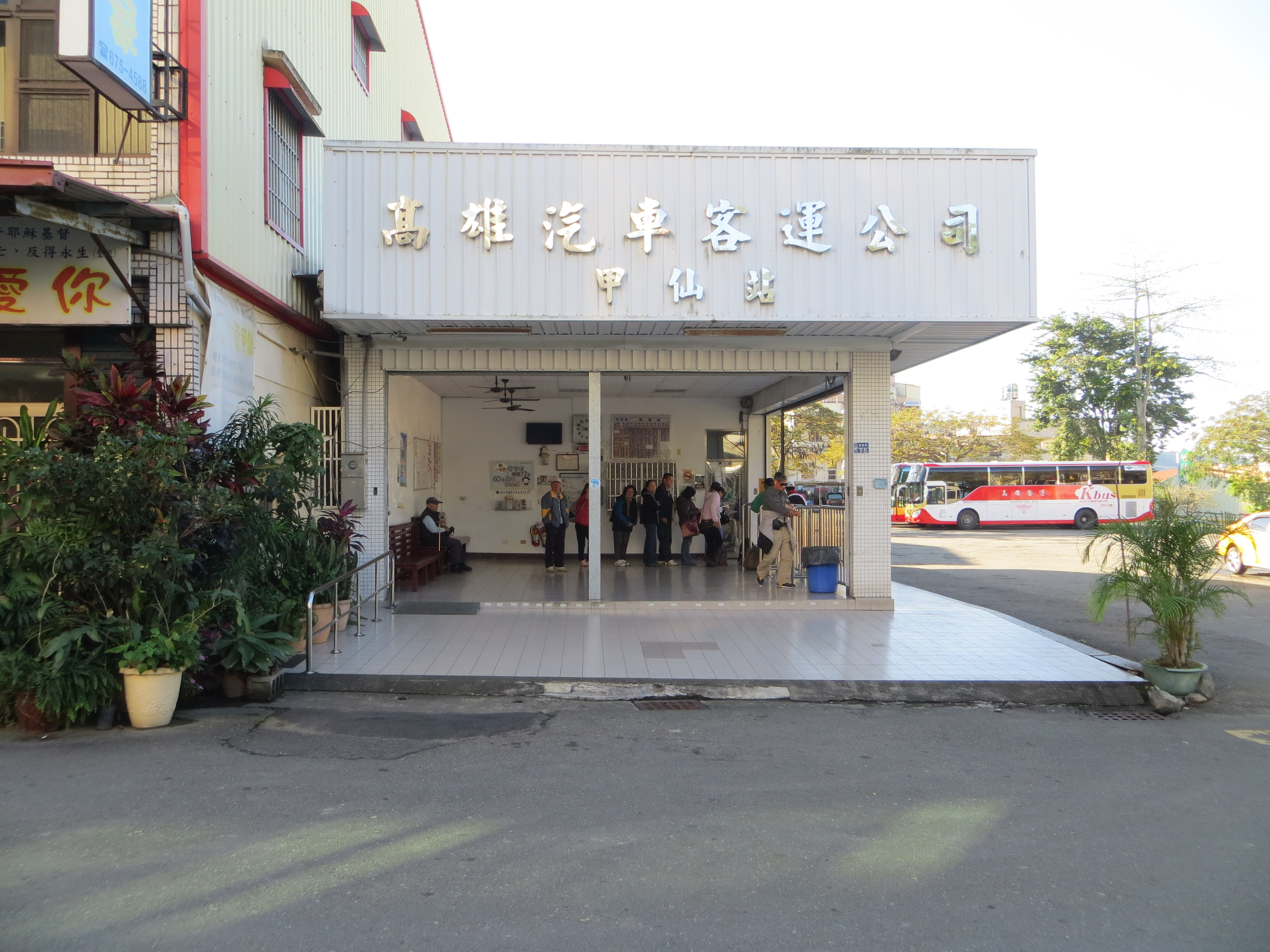
Jiaxian Bus Station

Bus station in the district is Jiaxian Station of Kaohsiung Bus.

== See also ==
- Kaohsiung
