= Lugu, Nantou =

Rural township in Nantou County, Taiwan

Coordinates: 23.75°N 120.733°E

Lugu Township 鹿谷鄉 Shikatani
- Rural township
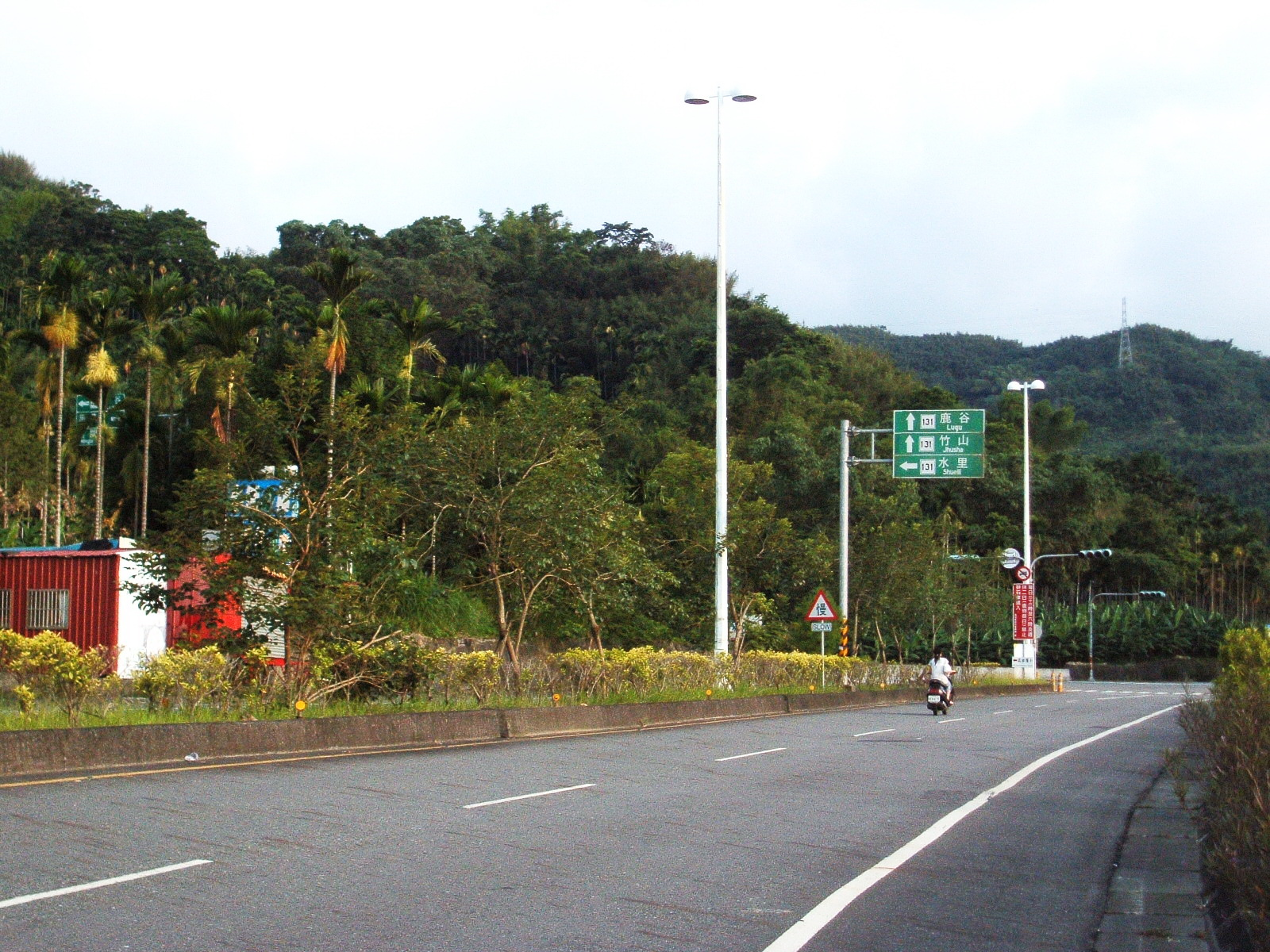

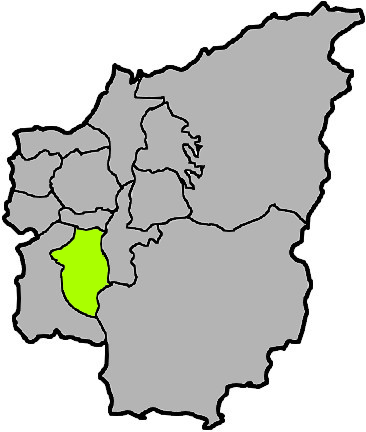
- Lugu Township in Nantou County
- Location: Nantou County, Taiwan

Area
  - Total: 142 km^{2} (55 sq mi)

Population (February 2023)
  - Total: 16,413
  - Density: 116/km^{2} (299/sq mi)

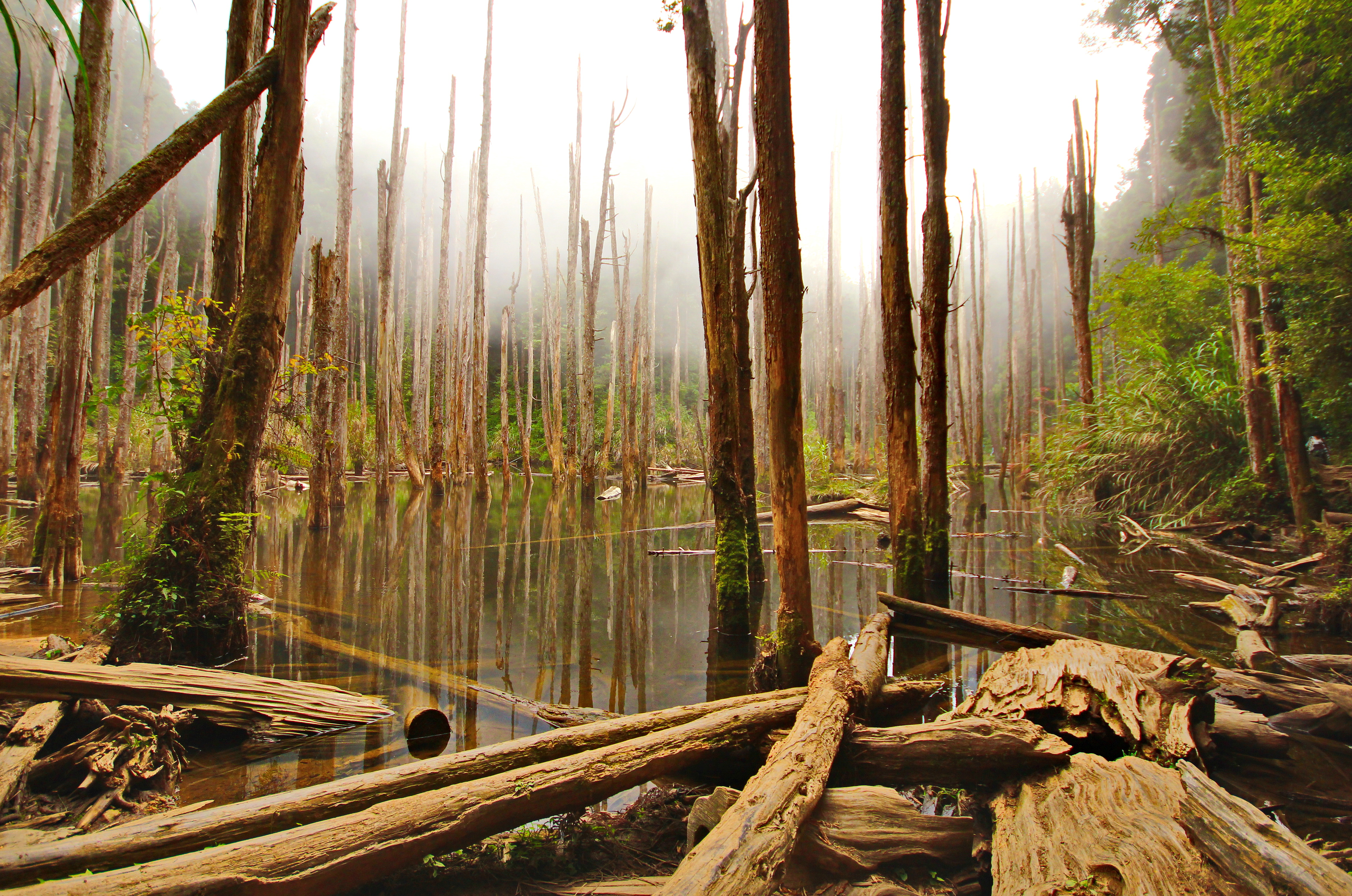
Lotus Forest

Lugu Township (Chinese: 鹿谷鄉; pinyin: Lùgǔ Xiāng; Wade–Giles: Lu^{4}-ku^{3} Hsiang^{1}; Pe̍h-ōe-jī: Lo̍k-kok Hiong) is a rural township located in the southwest of Nantou County, Taiwan. Lugu is known as the home of Dongding Oolong Tea, which was first cultivated on Dong Ding Mountain in the area.

== Administrative divisions ==
Lugu, Zhangya, Guangxing, Yonglong, Fenghuang, Neihu, Heya, Zhulin, Zhufeng, Chuxiang, Xiufeng, Qingshui and Ruitian Village

== Economy ==
- Dong Ding tea

== Tourist attractions ==
- Fonghuanggu Bird and Ecology Park
- Jiji Weir
- Ming Shan Resort
- Xitou Nature Education Area

== Transportation ==
- County Road 139:Lugu － Shuili
- County Road 151:Jhushan － Sun Link Sea Highway
