= Jishan Gatehouse =

Historic building in Beitun, Taichung, Taiwan

Coordinates: 24.1693°N 120.6938°E

- 積善樓 (Chinese)
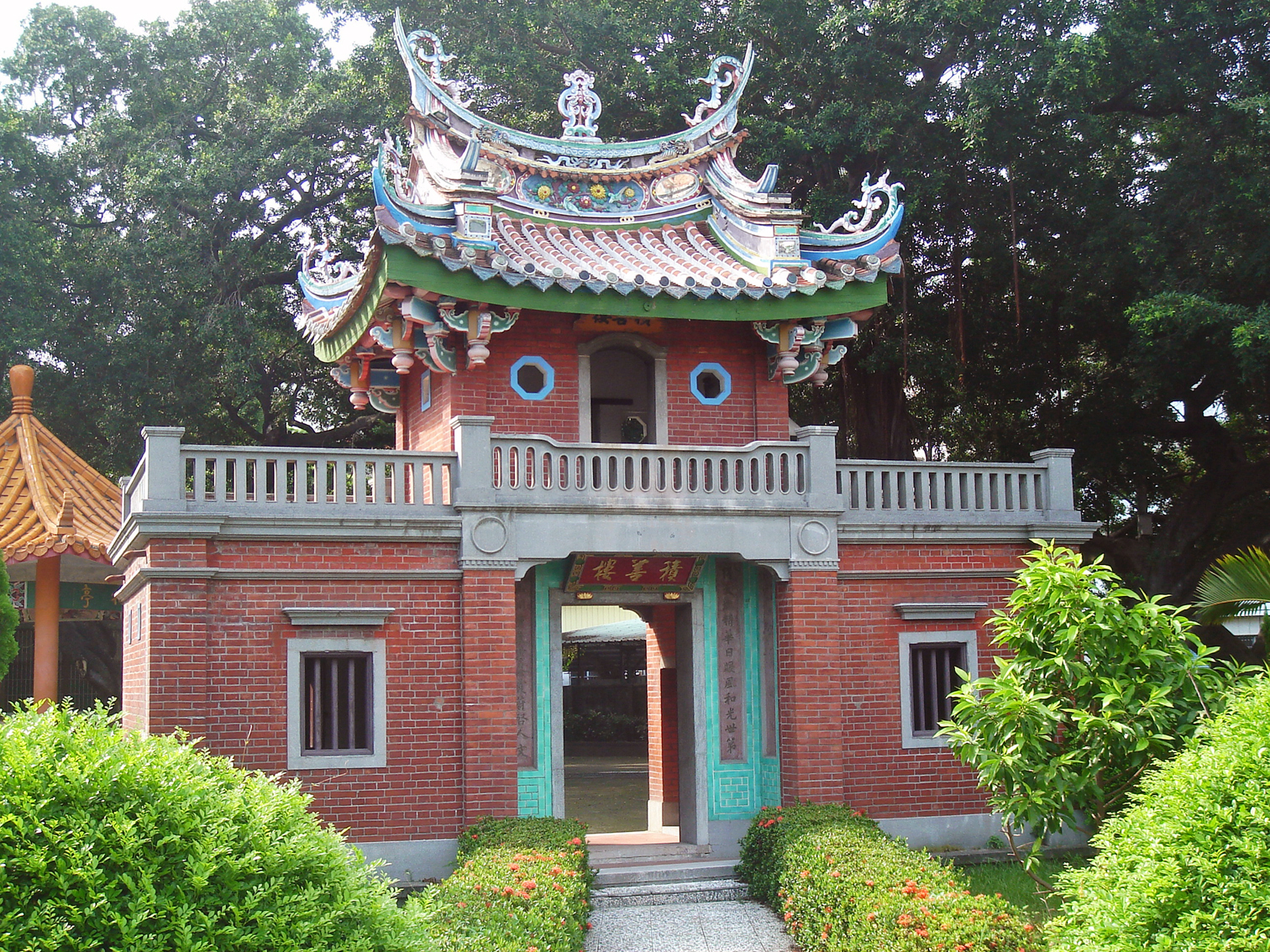
- Interactive map of Jishan Gatehouse
- Type: Gatehouse
- Location: Beitun District, Taichung, Taiwan

History
- Built: 1924; 102 years ago

Site notes
- Owner: Taichung City Government

Jishan Gatehouse (Chinese: 積善樓; pinyin: Jīshànlóu, literally "accumulate goodwill tower") is a historic gatehouse in Beitun District, Taichung, Taiwan. Initially constructed as the south entrance to a sanheyuan, the gatehouse is protected as a historical site in Taichung.

== History ==
The Lai family were one of the earliest Han Chinese settlers in Taichung. Originating from Pinghe County, Fujian in mainland China, the family settled in what is modern-day Beitun District. In 1898, a member of this family, Changrong Lai (賴長榮), moved from Touzhang to the north to the current location, building the sanheyuan known as "Huaidetang" (懷德堂; Huáidétáng). A simple gate was constructed at the southern entrance. In 1924, the family decided to rebuild the southern entrance according to a feng shui specialist's advice. The new entrance is said to be able to boost the family's prosperity and keep them away from harm. The name of the building was taken to encourage future generations to act with kindness.

== See also ==
- History of Taiwan
- Han Taiwanese
