= Fonghuanggu Bird and Ecology Park =

Bird park in Lugu, Nantou County, Taiwan

Fonghuanggu Bird and Ecology Park 鳳凰谷鳥園生態園區

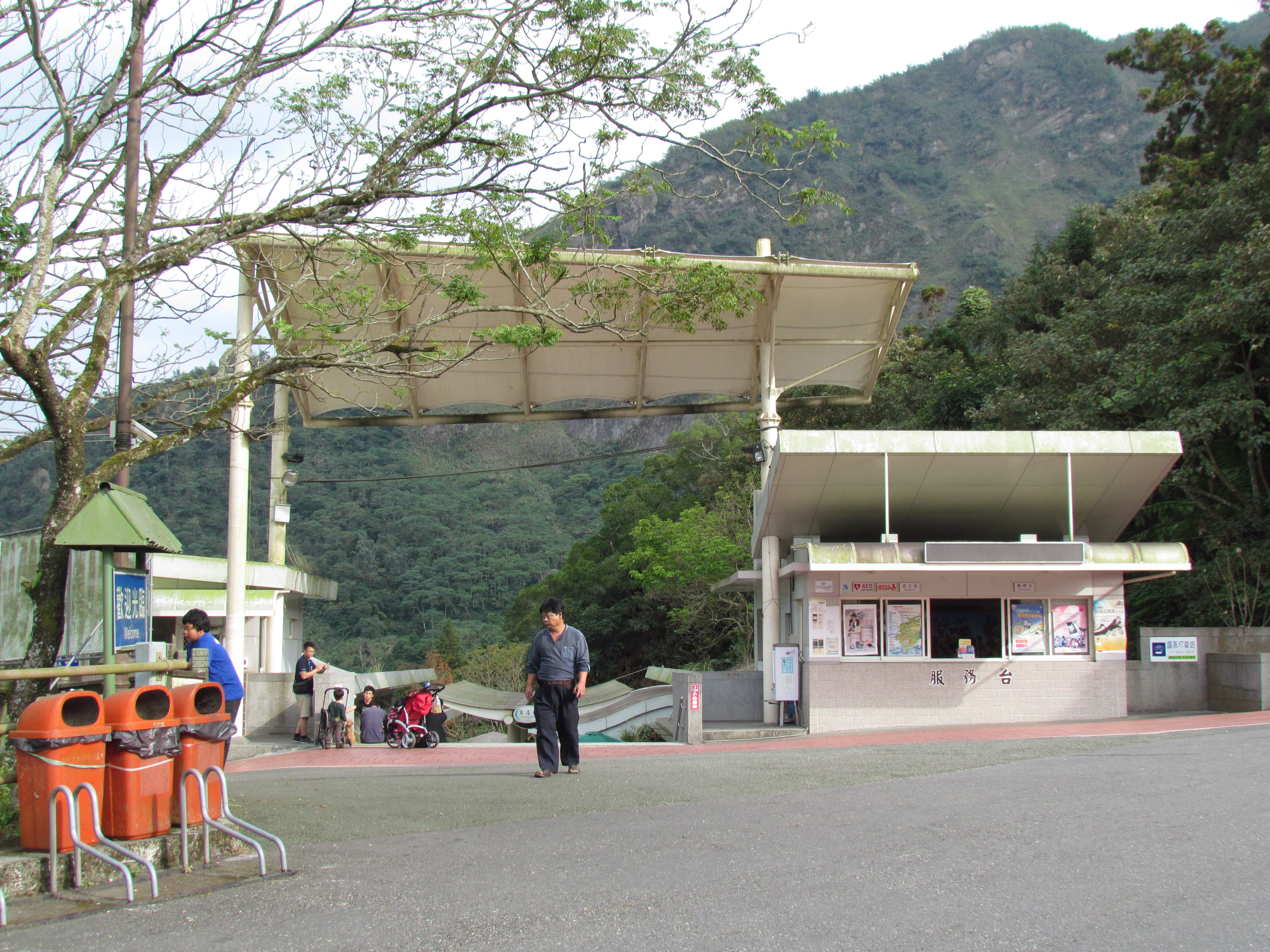
- Interactive map of Fonghuanggu Bird and Ecology Park 鳳凰谷鳥園生態園區
- 23°43′43″N 120°47′31″E
- Date opened: 18 December 1982
- Location: Lugu, Nantou, Taiwan
- Land area: 30 hectares (74 acres)
- Website: Official website

The Fonghuanggu Bird and Ecology Park (traditional Chinese: 鳳凰谷鳥園生態園區; simplified Chinese: 凤凰谷鸟园生态园区; pinyin: Fènghuánggǔ Niǎo Yuán Shēngtài Yuánqū) is a bird park in Lugu Township, Nantou County, Taiwan.

== History ==
In 1978, the Taiwan Provincial Government decided to build a bird park in Fonghuanggu Scenic Area located in Nantou County and named it Fonghuanggu Bird Park. In April 1979, the Taiwan Provincial Consultative Council passed the proposal to establish the Fonghuanggu Bird Park Planning Committee which would be given task to collect information and conduct site surveys for the bird park construction. After several years the construction planning was completed. The construction was completed at the end of October 1982 and the park was opened on 18 December 1982. On 1 January 2013, the management of the bird park was given to National Museum of Natural Science and the bird park was renamed as Fonghuanggu Bird and Ecology Park.

== Architecture ==
Covering an area of 30 hectares, the bird park is located at the foothill of Mount Fonghuang at an altitude of 650–850 meters above sea level. The area surrounding it is home to various species of wild birds, insects and reptiles. The bird park houses ten aviaries which are linked together with a 2-km long walking trail. The mesh enclosures are 8-story high. It also features a crane museum named Songher Museum.

== Exhibitions ==
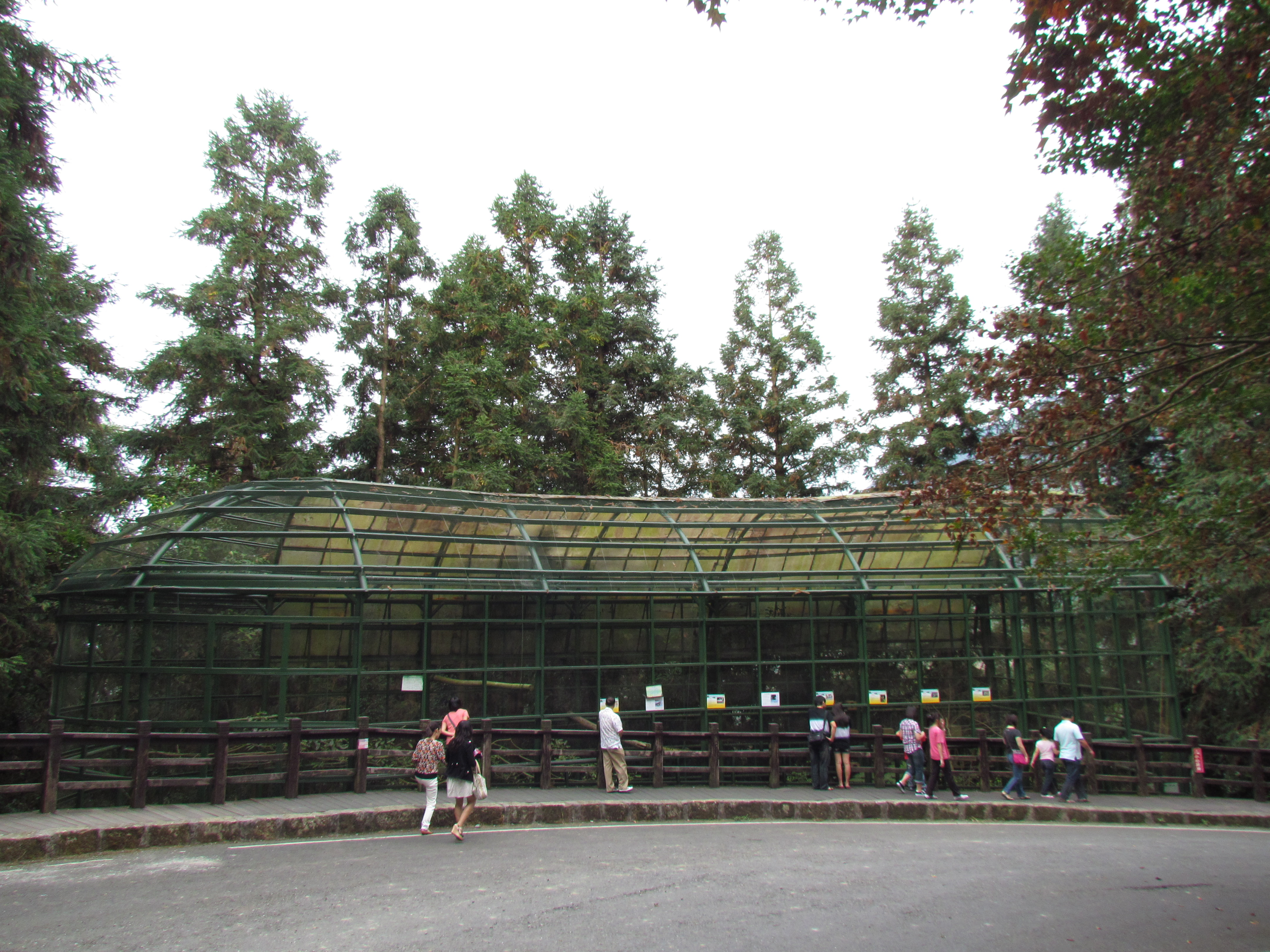
Park interior

The bird park is home to more than one hundred species of rare birds.

- Garden of Cranes
- Garden of Pheasants
- Rainforest Area
- Garden of Rare Birds
- Garden of Raptors
- Garden of Peacock
- Garden of Flightless Birds
- Garden of Warbler
- Garden of Endemic Species

== Transportation ==
The bird park is accessible by bus from Taichung.

== See also ==
- List of tourist attractions in Taiwan
