= Qishan River =

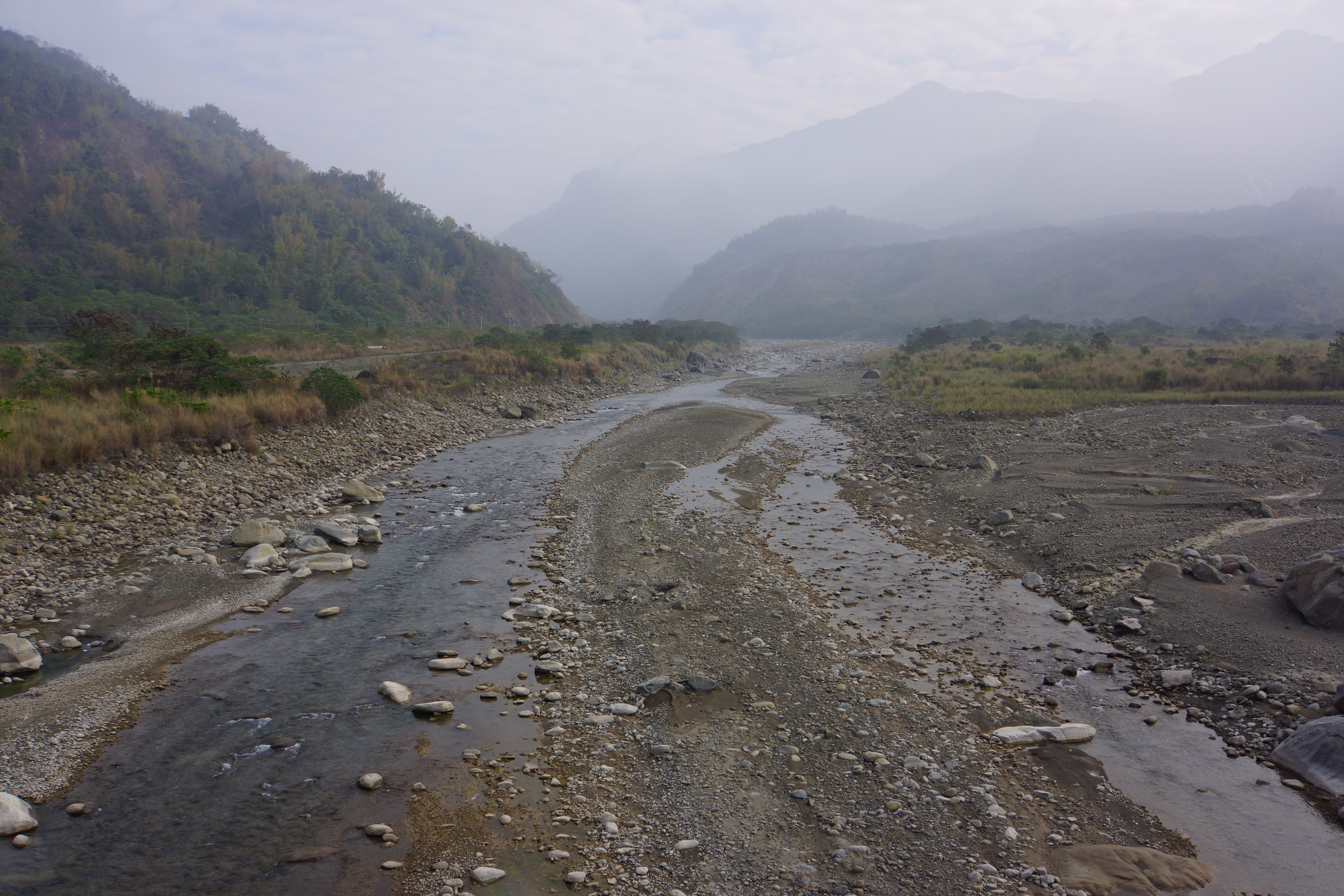

- The confluence of the Qishan and Gaoping Rivers

Location
- Country: Taiwan

Physical characteristics
- Mouth
  - location: Ligang/Cishan
  - coordinates: 22.832°N 120.467°E
- Length: 117 km (73 mi)
- Basin size: 842 km^{2} (325 sq mi)
- Discharge
  - location: Nanfeng Bridge
  - average: 30 m^{3}/s (1,100 cu ft/s)
  - minimum: 0.1 m^{3}/s (3.5 cu ft/s)
  - maximum: 1,298 m^{3}/s (45,800 cu ft/s)

Basin features
- River system: Gaoping River

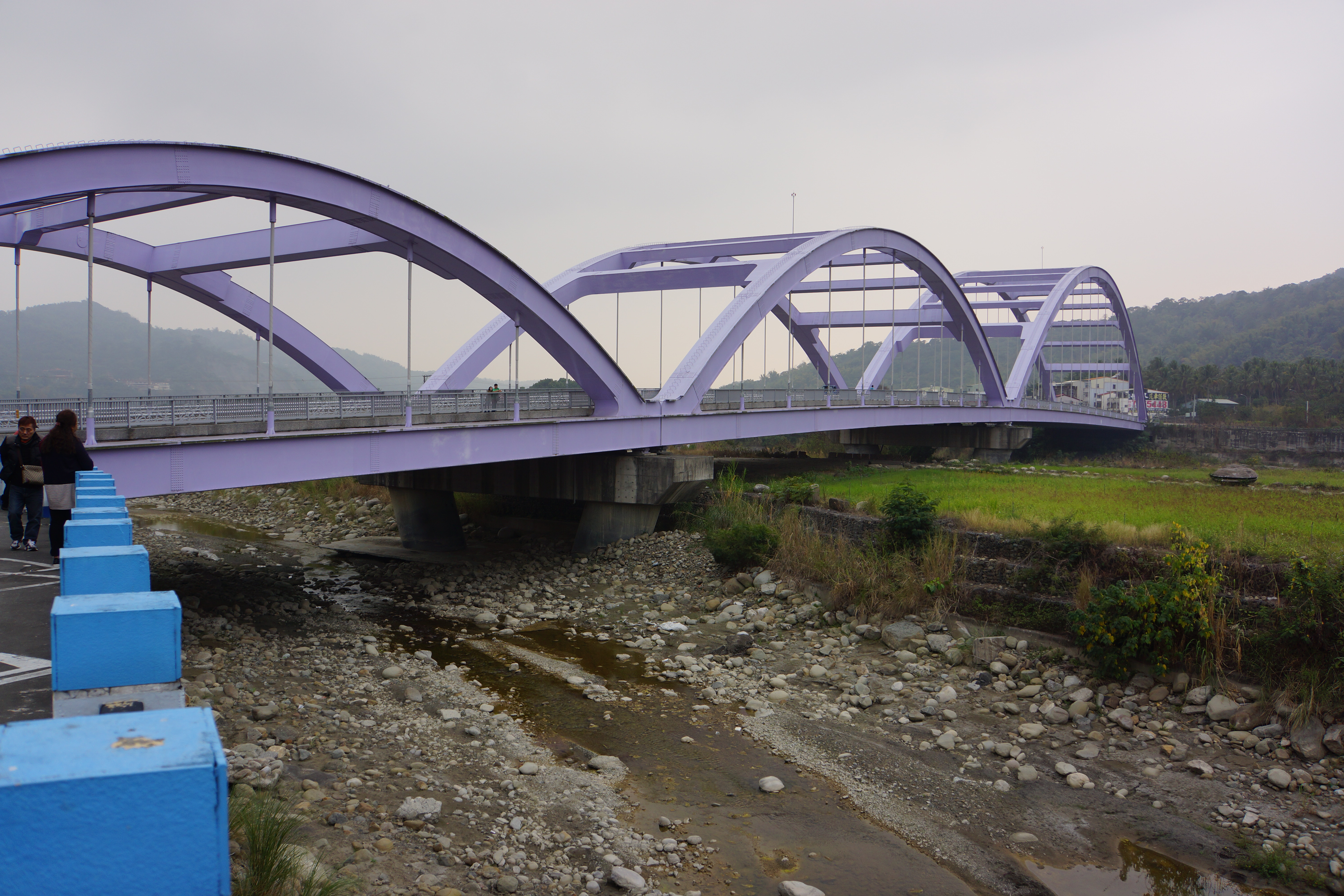
Jiasian Bridge over Qishan River

The Qishan River (Chinese: 旗山溪; Hanyu Pinyin: Qíshān Xī; Tongyong Pinyin: Císhan Si; Wade–Giles: Ch'i^{2}-shan^{1} Hsi^{1}) or Nanzixian River (Chinese: 楠梓仙溪; Hanyu Pinyin: Nánzǐxian Xī; Tongyong Pinyin: Nánzǐhsian Si; Wade–Giles: Nan^{2}-tzu^{3}-hsien^{5} Hsi^{1}) is a tributary of the Gaoping River in Taiwan. It flows through Chiayi County, Kaohsiung City, and Pingtung County for 117 km.

== Bridges ==
- Jiaxian Bridge

== See also ==
- List of rivers in Taiwan
