= List of pholidotans =

Species in mammal order Pholidota

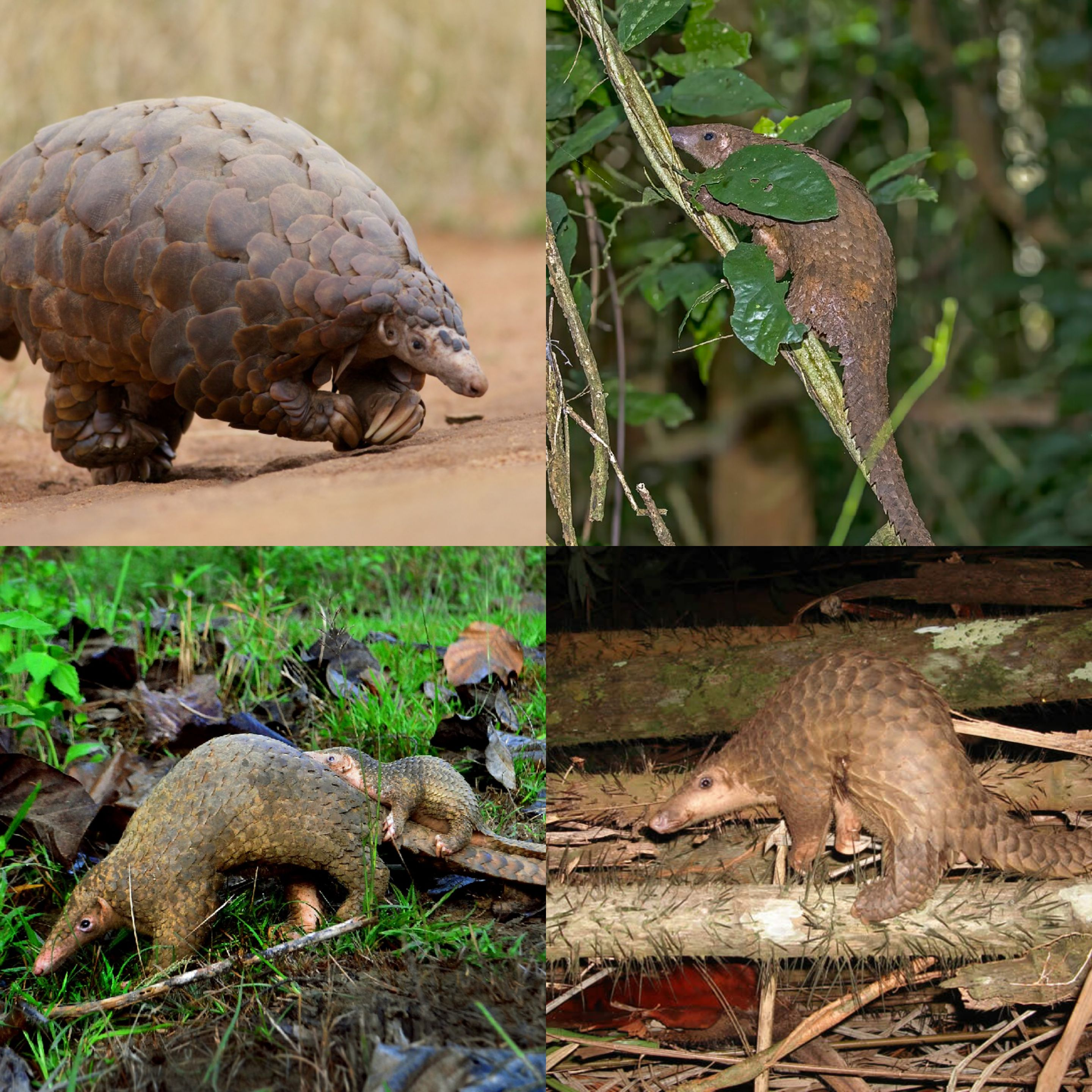
Manidae species of different genera; from top-left, clockwise: ground pangolin (Smutsia temminckii), tree pangolin (Phataginus tricuspis), Philippine pangolin (Manis culionensis), and Sunda pangolin (Manis javanica)

Pholidota is an order of placental mammals in the Pholidotamorpha clade. A member of this order is called a pholidotan or a pangolin. They are distributed throughout Africa, the Indian subcontinent and southeast Asia, and are usually found in habitats such as savannas, forests, grasslands and shrublands. Pholidotans range in size from the giant pangolin, at 30 kg (66 lb) and 68 cm (27 in) in length, to the tree pangolin, at only 2.3 kg (5.1 lb) and 34 cm (13 in) in length. They have large, hardened, keratin scales which cover their skin, and long claws which they use for digging or climbing trees. Most species are nocturnal and feed primarily on ants and termites, though other insects may also be taken. Despite only a few pholidotans having population estimates, all eight species are classified as threatened by the IUCN Red List, with three being classified as critically endangered, largely due to intensive poaching of their keratin scales.

The eight extant species of Pholidota are assigned to the family Manidae which is split into three genera within three subfamilies: Maninae (Asian pangolins), Phatagininae (African tree pangolins) and Smutsiinae (African ground pangolins). A ninth species, Manis mysteria, was proposed in 2023, though its status as valid taxa remains uncertain. Around a dozen extinct prehistoric pholidotan species have been described; however, due to ongoing research the exact categorization and number is not fixed.

== Conventions ==
IUCN Red List categories
Conservation status
- EX: Extinct (0 species)
- EW: Extinct in the wild (0 species)
- CR: Critically endangered (3 species)
- EN: Endangered (3 species)
- VU: Vulnerable (2 species)
- NT: Near threatened (0 species)
- LC: Least concern (0 species)

The author citation for the species or genus is given after the scientific name; parentheses around the author citation indicate that this was not the original taxonomic placement. Conservation status codes listed follow the International Union for Conservation of Nature (IUCN) Red List of Threatened Species. Range maps are provided where possible; if unavailable, a description of the species will instead be provided. All extinct species and subspecies listed alongside extant species went extinct in prehistoric times, and are indicated by dagger symbol "†". Population figures are rounded to the nearest hundred.

== Classification ==
The Pholidota order is composed of eight extant species belonging to three genera in three subfamilies. This does not include extinct species or hybrid animals.

- Family Manidae
  - Subfamily Maninae
    - Genus: Manis (Asian pangolins): four species
  - Subfamily Phatagininae
    - Genus: Phataginus (African tree pangolins): two species
  - Subfamily Smutsiinae
    - Genus: Smutsia (African ground pangolins): two species

- Manidae
  - - Maninae/Manis
      - - Indian pangolin
        - - Philippine pangolin
          - Sunda pangolin
      - Chinese pangolin
  - - Smutsiinae/Smutsia
      - Giant pangolin
      - Ground pangolin
    - Phatagininae/Phataginus
      - Tree pangolin
      - Long-tailed pangolin

== Pholidotans ==
The following classification is based on the taxonomy described by the reference work Mammal Species of the World (2005), with augmentation by generally accepted proposals made since using molecular phylogenetic analysis, as supported by the IUCN Red List.

=== Subfamily Maninae ===
Genus Manis – Linnaeus, 1758 – four species
Common name	Scientific name and subspecies	Range	Size and ecology	IUCN status and estimated population
Indian pangolin	M. crassicaudata E. Geoffroy, 1803	Indian subcontinent (current range in blue)	Size: 51–75 cm (20–30 in) long, with a 33 to 47 cm (13 to 19 in) long tail and a weight of 10–16 kg (22–35 lb) Habitat: Savanna, forest, grassland and shrubland Diet: Myrmecophagous; eats ants and termites	EN unknown
Chinese pangolin	M. pentadactyla Linnaeus, 1758 Three subspecies: M. p. auritus; M. p. pusilla; M. p. pentadactyla (Taiwanese pangolin)	Southeast Asia (current range in green)	Size: 40–58 cm (16–23 in) long, with a 25–38 cm (9.8–15.0 in) long tail and a weight of 2.5–7 kg (5.5–15.4 lb) Habitat: Forest, shrubland and grassland Diet: Eats insects such as ants and termites	CR 10,000
Philippine pangolin	M. culionensis de Elera, 1895	Southeast Asia (current range in brown)	Size: 45–54 cm (18–21 in) long, with a 39–50 cm (15–20 in) long tail and a weight of 2.5–8 kg (5.5–17.6 lb) Habitat: Forest, shrubland, and artificial habitats Diet: Preys exclusively on ant and termite species	CR unknown
Sunda pangolin	M. javanica Desmarest, 1822	Southeast Asia (current range in green)	Size: 40–65 cm (16–26 in) long, with a 35–58 cm (14–23 in) long tail and a weight of 3–10 kg (6.6–22.0 lb) Habitat: Forests, shrublands, artificial terrestrial and aquatic habitats, and marine habitats Diet: Primarily consume ants and their larvae, bee pupas, crickets, flies and termites	CR unknown

=== Subfamily Phatagininae ===
Genus Phataginus – Linnaeus, 1766 – two species
Common name	Scientific name and subspecies	Range	Size and ecology	IUCN status and estimated population
Long-tailed pangolin	P. tetradactyla Linnaeus, 1766	Central and West Africa (current range in green-brown)	Size: 30–40 cm (12–16 in) long, with a 55–70 cm (22–28 in) long tail and a weight of 2–3.5 kg (4.4–7.7 lb) Habitat: Forest, savanna, and artificial habitats Diet: Feeds on ants and termites	VU unknown
Tree pangolin	P. tricuspis (Rafinesque, 1821)	Central and West Africa (current range in brown)	Size: 25–43 cm (9.8–16.9 in) long, with a 35–62 cm (14–24 in) long tail and a weight of 1.6–3 kg (3.5–6.6 lb) Habitat: Forest, savanna, and artificial habitats Diet: Feeds on ants and termites	EN unknown

=== Subfamily Smutsiinae ===
Genus Smutsia – Gray, 1865 – two species
Common name	Scientific name and subspecies	Range	Size and ecology	IUCN status and estimated population
Giant pangolin	S. gigantea Illiger, 1815	Central and East Africa (current range in light brown)	Size: 67–81 cm (26–32 in) long, with a 58–68 cm (23–27 in) long tail and a weight of 30 kg (66 lb) Habitat: Forest and savanna Diet: Eats mainly ants and termites, and sometimes other insects	EN unknown
Ground pangolin	S. temminckii (Smuts, 1832)	Southern, East and North Africa (current range in green)	Size: 45–55 cm (18–22 in) long, with a 40–52 cm (16–20 in) long tail and a weight of 5–20 kg (11–44 lb) Habitat: Forest, savanna and grassland Diet: Myrmecophagous; preys primarily on ants and termites	VU 16,300–24,000 in South Africa

== Prehistoric pholidotans ==
In addition to extant species, multiple extinct species have been described and classified into Pholidota. They are placed into three extinct families: Eomanidae, Patriomanidae and Eurotamandua, as well as the extant family Manidae. The genus Necromanis on the other hand, is placed as incertae sedis within the pholidotid superfamily Manoidea, together with the families Manidae and Patriomanidae. Euromanis, a genus described in 2009, is not placed under any family and is instead assigned to the Pholidota order. The extinct species listed here are mainly based on the 2019 reference work Pangolins: Science, Society and Conservation, unless otherwise cited. Where available, the temporal range of each species will be given in millions of years before the present time (mya). This list will only contain taxa that went extinct during prehistoric times.

Genus Euromanis – Gaudin, 2009 – 1 species
Species name	Image	Geological range	Biogeography
Euromanis krebsi Storch & Martin, 1994	Euromanis krebsi bones	Eocene	Messel Pit in Germany

=== Superfamily Manoidea ===
Genus Necromanis – Filhol, 1894 – 3 species
Species name	Image	Geological range	Biogeography
Necromanis franconica Quenstedt, 1885		Paleogene–Neogene	Europe
Necromanis parva Koenigswald, 1969		Paleogene–Neogene	Europe
Necromanis quercyi Filhol, 1894		Paleogene–Neogene	Europe

=== Family Patriomanidae ===
Genus Patriomanis – Emry, 1970 – 1 species
Species name	Image	Geological range	Biogeography
Patriomanis americana Emry, 1970	Life reconstruction of Patriomanis americana	Eocene	North America

Genus Cryptomanis – Gaudin, Emry, and Pogue, 2006 – 1 species
Species name	Image	Geological range	Biogeography
Cryptomanis gobiensis Gaudin, Emry, and Pogue, 2006		Eocene	Inner Mongolia, China

=== Family Eurotamanduidae ===
Genus Eurotamandua – Storch, 1981 – 1 species
Species name	Image	Geological range	Biogeography
Eurotamandua joresi Storch, 1981	Life reconstruction of Eurotamandua joresi	Eocene	Messel Pit in Germany

=== Family Eomanidae ===
Genus Eomanis – Storch, 1978 – 1 species
Species name	Image	Geological range	Biogeography
Eomanis waldi Storch, 1978	Life reconstruction of Eomanis waldi	Eocene	Messel Pit in Germany

=== Family Manidae ===
Genus Manis – Linnaeus, 1758 – 3 (Note: This only includes extinct Manis species) species
Species name	Image	Geological range	Biogeography
Manis palaeojavanica Dubois, 1907		Pleistocene	Asia
Manis lydekkeri Dubois, 1908		Pleistocene	Unknown
Manis hungarica Kormos, 1934		Unknown	Unknown

Genus Smutsia – Gray, 1865 – 1 (Note: This only includes extinct Smutsia species) species
Species name	Image	Geological range	Biogeography
Smutsia olteniensis Terhune, Gaudin, Curran & Petculescu, 2021		Pleistocene	Europe

== See also ==
- Pholidotamorpha
- Pangolin trade
