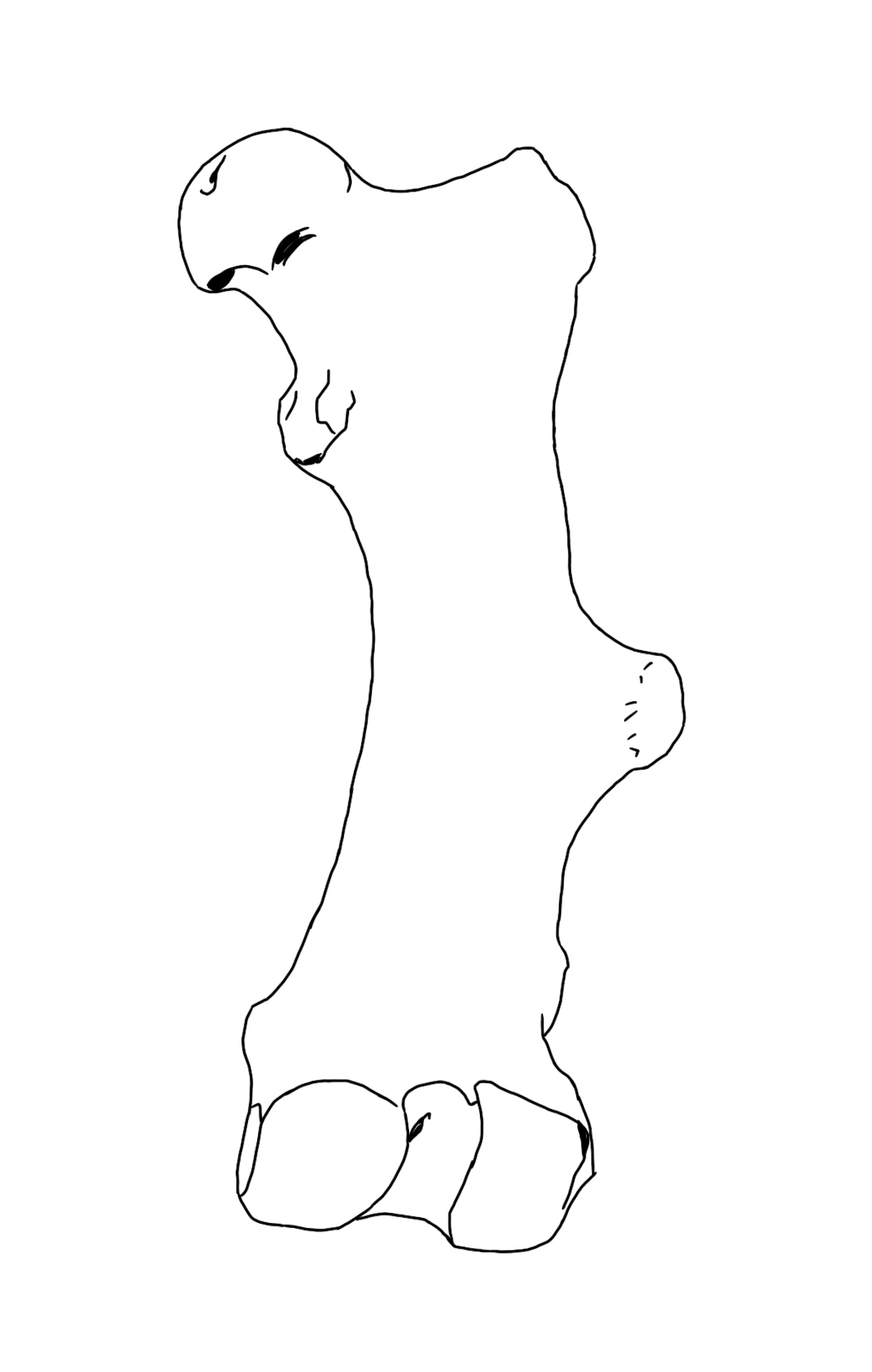
- illustration of Cryptomanis gobiensis right femur bone

Scientific classification
- Kingdom: Animalia
- Phylum: Chordata
- Class: Mammalia
- Infraclass: Placentalia
- Order: Pholidota
- Suborder: Eupholidota
- Superfamily: Manoidea
- Family: †Patriomanidae
- Genus: †Cryptomanis; Gaudin, Emry, and Pogue, 2006

Type species
- †Cryptomanis gobiensis Gaudin, Emry, and Pogue, 2006

= Cryptomanis =

Cryptomanis Temporal range: 42.0–39.9 Ma middle Eocene

Genus of mammals

Cryptomanis ("hidden pangolin") is an extinct genus of pangolin from extinct family Patriomanidae. The genus is only known from the holotype specimen from middle Eocene deposits from Inner Mongolia, China. The holotype, AMNH 26140, was labeled as an unnamed pangolin in the fossil collection for decades. The remains consist of an incomplete postcranial specimen, with nearly complete hind limbs, an incomplete pelvis, a complete lumbar series from an incomplete vertebral column, numerous fragmentary remains of rib and sternal bones, a fragmentary scapula, and partially preserved forelimbs. Based on the femural length Cryptomanis was comparable in size to the modern Sunda pangolin (Manis javanica).

== Phylogeny ==
Phylogenetic position of genus Cryptomanis within order Pholidota based on Rose (2026.) study:

- - outhgroup
  - Pholidotamorpha (Pholidota [sensu lato])
    - - - †Afredentata
        - †Palaeanodonta
      - †Euromanis
    - Pholidota sensu stricto
      - Eupholidota
        - †Eomanoidea
        - Manoidea
          - Manidae
          - - ?
              †Necromanis
            - †Patriomanidae
              - †Patriomanis
              - †Cryptomanis
                †Cryptomanis gobiensis

== See also ==
- Mammal classification
- Patriomanidae
