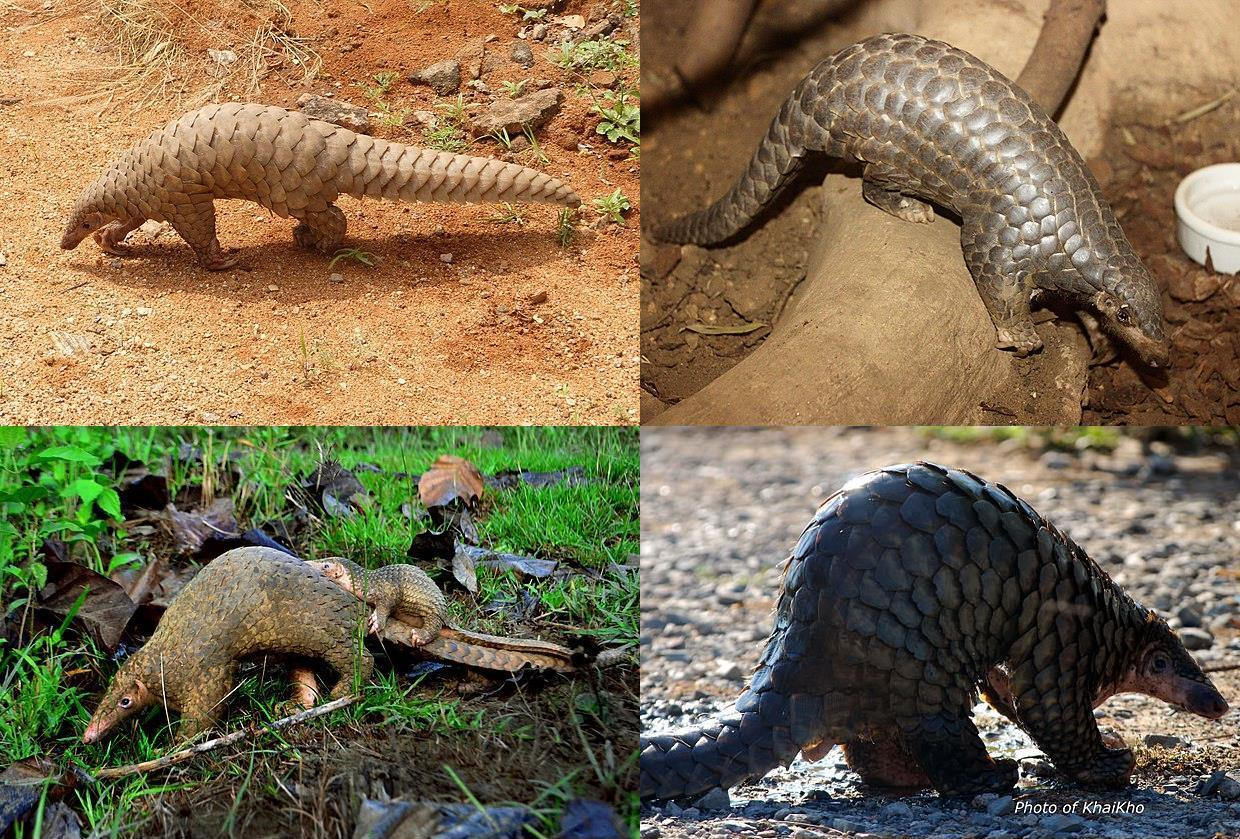
- Living pangolins from genus Manis

Scientific classification
- Kingdom: Animalia
- Phylum: Chordata
- Class: Mammalia
- Order: Pholidota
- Family: Manidae
- Subfamily: Maninae; Gray, 1821
- Genus: Manis; Linnaeus, 1758

Type species
- Manis pentadactyla Linnaeus, 1758

Species
- Manis aurita; Manis crassicaudata; Manis pentadactyla; †Manis hungarica; †Manis lydekkeri; Subgenus: Paramanis; Manis culionensis; Manis javanica; Manis mysteria; †Manis palaeojavanica
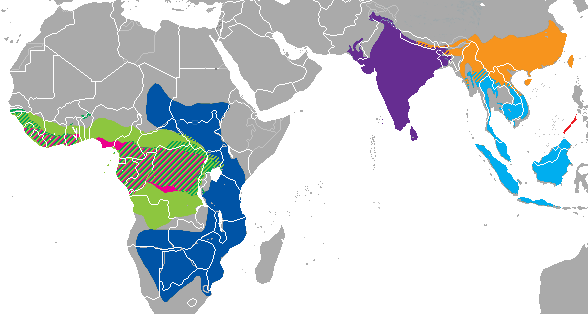
- Manis crassicaudata Manis culionensis Manis javanica Manis pentadactyla

Synonyms
- synonyms of subfamily: Mania; Manidae (Gray, 1821); Manina (Gray, 1825); Pholidotina (Gray, 1873); synonyms of genus: Pangolin (Gray, 1873); Pangolinus (Rafinesque, 1821); Paramanis (Pocock, 1924); Phatages (Sundevall, 1843); Phatagenus (Sundevall, 1843); Pholidotus (Brisson, 1762); Quaggelo (Frisch, 1775)

= Manis =

Asiatic pangolin Temporal range: 12.9–0 Ma Middle Miocene - present

Genus of mammals

Manis ("spirit") is a genus of South Asian and East Asian pangolins, the Asiatic pangolins, from the subfamily Maninae, within the family Manidae.

== Taxonomy ==
- Subfamily: Maninae (Asiatic pangolins)
  - Genus: Manis (Asiatic pangolins)
    - Manis crassicaudata (Indian pangolin)
    - Manis pentadactyla (Chinese pangolin)
    - Manis aurita (= Manis indoburmanica)
    - Manis mysteria (Cryptic pangolin)
    - †Manis hungarica
    - †Manis lydekkeri
    - Subgenus: Paramanis
      - Manis culionensis (Philippine pangolin)
      - Manis javanica (Sunda pangolin)
      - †Manis palaeojavanica (Giant asian pangolin)

== Phylogeny ==
Phylogenetic position of genus Manis within family Manidae.

- Pholidotamorpha (Pholidota sensu lato)
  - †Palaeanodonta
  - Pholidota sensu stricto
    - †Euromanis
    - ?
      †Pholidota sp. (BC 16’08)
    - - †Eurotamanduidae
      - Eupholidota
        - †Eomanoidea
        - Manoidea
          - †Patriomanidae
          - ?
            †Necromanis
          - Manidae
            - Smutsiinae sensu lato
              - Phatagininae
              - Smutsiinae (sensu stricto)
            - ?
              †Manidae sp. (DPC 3972 & DPC 4364)
            - Maninae
              - Manis
                - - Manis pentadactyla
                  - ?
                    †Manis hungarica
                - - - Manis crassicaudata
                    - ?
                      †Manis lydekkeri
                  - - ?
                      Manis sp. (Scale_H4 & Scale_H8)
                    - (Paramanis)
                      - Manis culionensis
                      - Manis javanica
                      - ?
                        †Manis palaeojavanica
