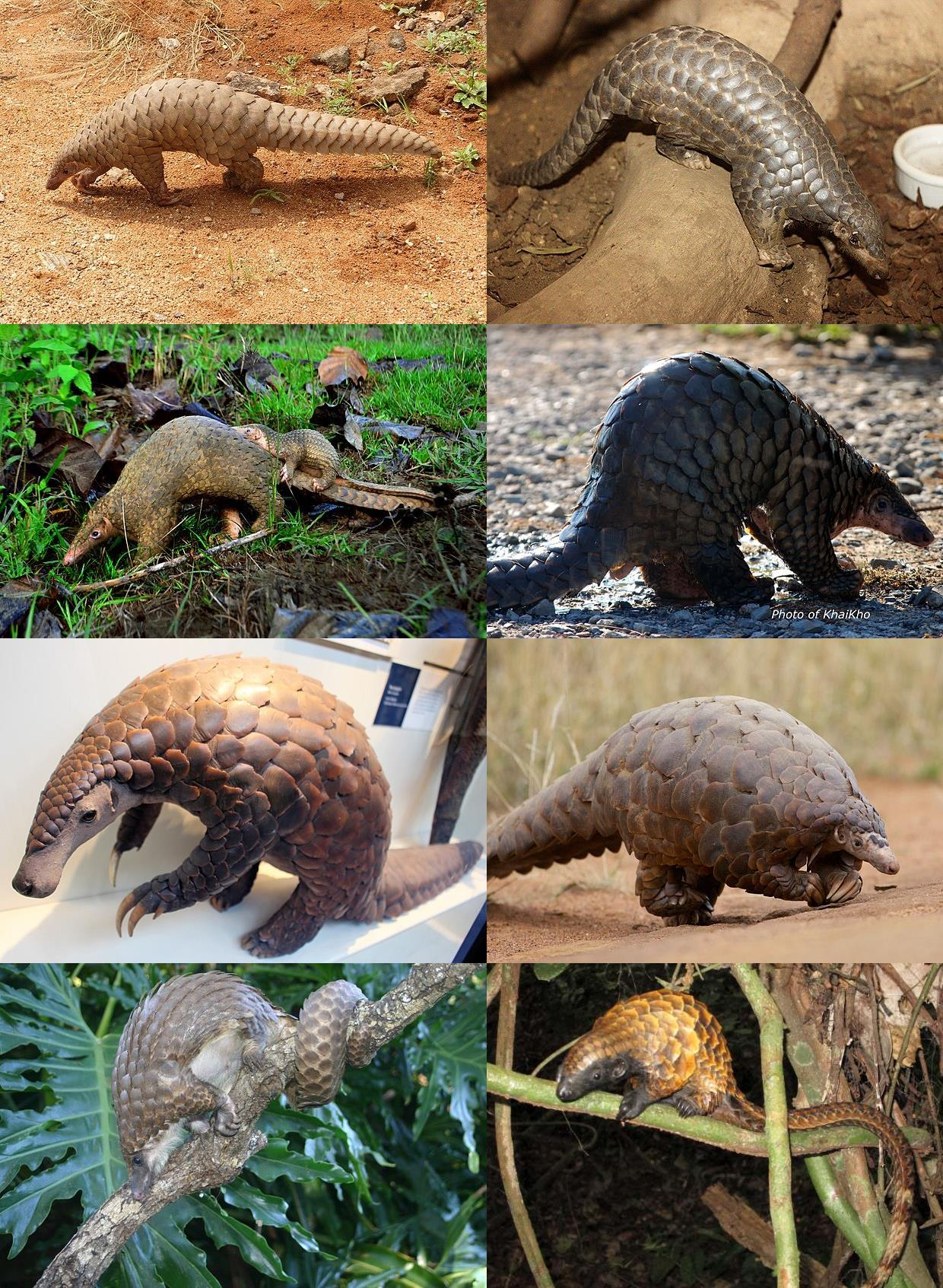
- Living species of pangolins

Conservation status
- CITES Appendix I

Scientific classification
- Kingdom: Animalia
- Phylum: Chordata
- Class: Mammalia
- Clade: Pholidotamorpha
- Order: Pholidota
- Suborder: Eupholidota
- Superfamily: Manoidea
- Family: Manidae; Gray, 1821

Type genus
- Manis Linnaeus, 1758

Genera
- [see classification]
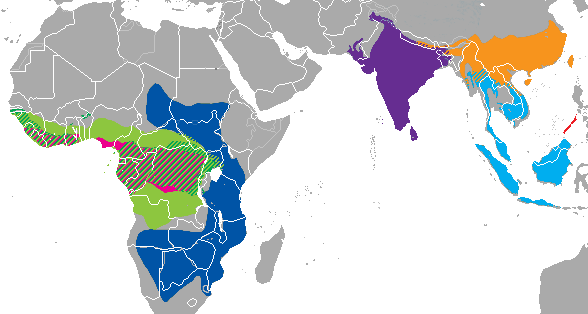
- Species ranges: Manis crassicaudata; Manis pentadactyla; Manis javanica; Manis culionensis; Phataginus tricuspis; Phataginus tetradactyla; Smutsia gigantea; Smutsia temminckii

Synonyms
- list of synonyms: Manida (Kalandadze & Rautian, 1992); Manididae (Gray, 1865); Manina (Gray, 1825); Manisia (Rafinesque, 1815); Perilepia (Rafinesque, 1815)

= Manidae =

Manidae Temporal range: 40.5–0 Ma middle Eocene - present

Family of pangolins

Manidae ("spirits") is the only extant family of pangolins. This family comprises three genera (Manis from subfamily Maninae, Phataginus from subfamily Phatagininae, and Smutsia from subfamily Smutsiinae), as well as the extinct Fayum pangolin.

== Classification and phylogeny ==
=== History of classification ===
All species of living pangolin had been assigned to the genus Manis until the late 2000s, when research prompted the splitting of extant pangolins into three genera: Manis, Phataginus, and Smutsia.

=== Taxonomy ===
Former classification (McKenna & Bell, 1997):	Current classification:
Family: Manidae (Gray, 1821) (pangolins); Subfamily: Maninae (Gray, 1821) (Asian pangolins); Genus: Manis (Linnaeus, 1758) (Asian pangolin); †Manis hungarica (Kormos, 1934) (Hungarian pangolin); †Manis lydekkeri (Dubois, 1908) (Lydekker's pangolin); †Manis palaeojavanica (Dubois, 1907) (giant Asian pangolin); Subgenus: Manis (Linnaeus, 1758); Manis crassicaudata (Gray, 1827) (Indian pangolin); Manis pentadactyla (Linnaeus, 1758) (Chinese pangolin); Subgenus: Paramanis (Pocock, 1924) (Southeast Asian pangolin); Manis javanica (Desmarest, 1822) (Sunda pangolin); Manis culionensis (de Elera, 1895) (Philippine pangolin); Genus: †Eomanis (Storch, 1978); †Eomanis krebsi (Storch & Martin, 1994); †Eomanis waldi (Storch, 1978); Genus: †Necromanis (Filhol, 1894); †Necromanis franconica (Quenstedt, 1885); †Necromanis parva (Koenigswald, 1969); †Necromanis quercyi (Filhol, 1894); Genus: †Patriomanis (Emry, 1970); †Patriomanis americana (Emry, 1970); Subfamily: Smutsiinae (Gray, 1873) (African pangolins); Tribe: Smutsiini (Gray, 1873) (large African pangolins); Genus: Smutsia (Gray, 1865) (African ground pangolin); Smutsia gigantea (Illiger, 1815) (giant pangolin); Smutsia temmincki (Smuts, 1832) (ground pangolin); Tribe: Uromanini (McKenna & Bell, 1997) (small African pangolins); Genus: Phataginus (Rafinesque, 1821); Phataginus tricuspis (Rafinesque, 1821) (white-bellied pangolin); Genus: Uromanis (Pocock, 1924); Phataginus tetradactyla (Linnaeus, 1766) (black-bellied pangolin); Genus: †Eurotamandua (Storch, 1981); †Eurotamandua joresi (Storch, 1981); Incertae sedis: †Manidae sp. [DPC 3972 & DPC 4364] (Gebo & Rasmussen, 1985) (Fayum pangolin)	Family: Manidae (Gray, 1821) (pangolins); Subfamily: Maninae (Gray, 1821) (Asian pangolins); Genus: Manis (Linnaeus, 1758) (Asian pangolin); †Manis hungarica (Kormos, 1934) (Hungarian pangolin); (unranked): northern Asian clade; Manis indoburmanica (Wangmo, 2025) (Indo Burmese pangolin); Manis pentadactyla (Linnaeus, 1758) (Chinese pangolin); (unranked): southern Asian clade; Manis crassicaudata (Gray, 1827) (Indian pangolin); Manis mysteria (Tong-Tong, 2023) (cryptic pangolin); †Manis lydekkeri (Dubois, 1908) (Lydekker's pangolin); Subgenus: Paramanis (Pocock, 1924) (Southeast Asian pangolin); Manis javanica (Desmarest, 1822) (Sunda pangolin); Manis culionensis (de Elera, 1895) (Philippine pangolin); †Manis palaeojavanica (Dubois, 1907) (giant Asian pangolin); (unranked): African clade; Subfamily: Phatagininae (Gaubert, 2017) (small African pangolins); Genus: Phataginus (Rafinesque, 1821) (African tree pangolin); Phataginus tetradactyla (Linnaeus, 1766) (black-bellied pangolin); Phataginus tricuspis (Rafinesque, 1821) (white-bellied pangolin); Subfamily: Smutsiinae (Gray, 1873) (large African pangolins); Genus: Smutsia (Gray, 1865) (African ground pangolin); Smutsia gigantea (Illiger, 1815) (giant pangolin); Smutsia temmincki (Smuts, 1832) (ground pangolin); †Smutsia olteniensis (Terhune, 2021) (Oltenian pangolin); Incertae sedis; †Manidae sp. [DPC 3972 & DPC 4364] (Gebo & Rasmussen, 1985) (Fayum pangolin)

=== Phylogeny ===
Cladogram of phylogeny within family Manidae
Position within order Pholidota based on Rose (2026.) study:

- - outhgroup
  - Pholidotamorpha (Pholidota [sensu lato])
    - - - †Afredentata
        - †Palaeanodonta
      - †Euromanis
    - Pholidota sensu stricto
      - Eupholidota
        - †Eomanoidea
        - Manoidea
          - - †Patriomanidae
            - ?
              †Necromanis
          - Manidae
            - Maninae
              Manis
            - Smutsiinae sensu lato
              - Phatagininae
                Phataginus
              - Smutsiinae sensu stricto
                Smutsia

Within family based on Wangmo (2025.) study:

- - outhgroup
  - Manidae
    - Maninae
      - Manis
        - - - (Paramanis)
              - Manis culionensis
              - Manis javanica
            - Manis mysteria
          - Manis crassicaudata
        - - Manis indoburmanica
          - Manis pentadactyla
    - Smutsiinae sensu lato
      - Phatagininae
        - Phataginus
          - Phataginus tetradactyla
          - Phataginus tricuspis
      - Smutsiinae sensu stricto
        - Smutsia
          - Smutsia gigantea
          - Smutsia temminckii

== See also ==
- Mammal classification
- Manoidea
