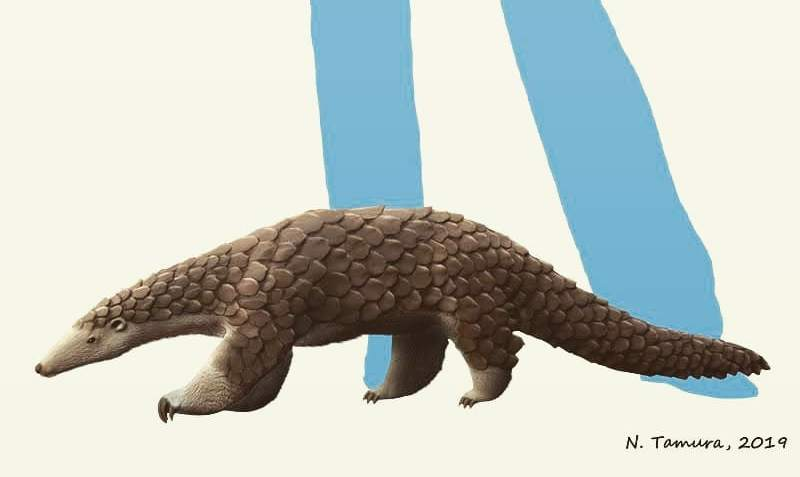
- Artist reconstruction of Patriomanis americana compared to the size of an adult human.
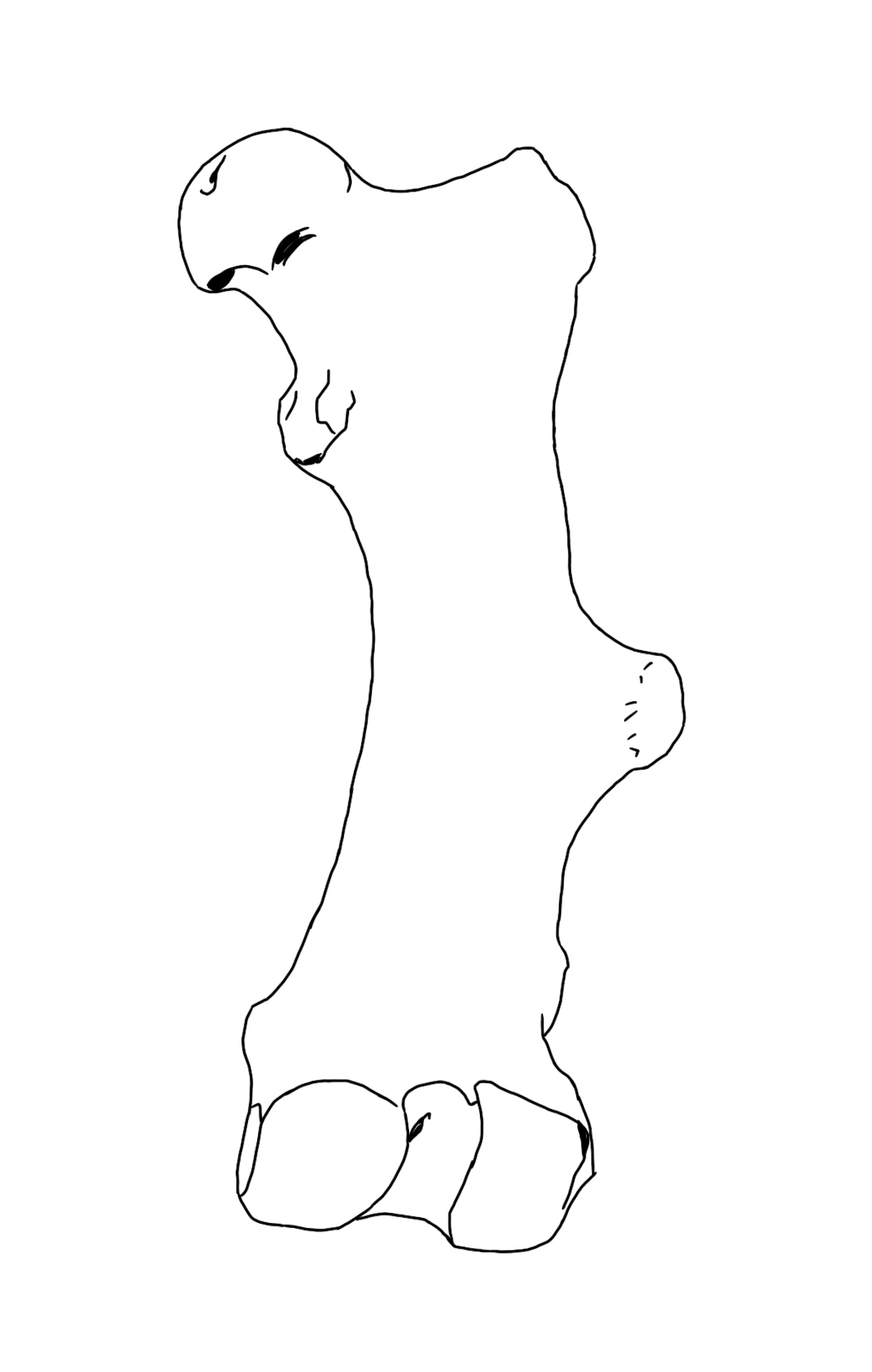
- illustration of Cryptomanis gobiensis right femur bone

Scientific classification
- Kingdom: Animalia
- Phylum: Chordata
- Class: Mammalia
- Infraclass: Placentalia
- Order: Pholidota
- Suborder: Eupholidota
- Superfamily: Manoidea
- Family: †Patriomanidae; Szalay & Schrenk, 1998

Type genus
- †Patriomanis Emry, 1970

Genera
- †Cryptomanis; †Patriomanis

= Patriomanidae =

Patriomanidae Temporal range: 42.0–33.7 Ma middle to late Eocene

Extinct family of pangolins

Patriomanidae ("fathers of pangolins") is an extinct family of pangolins from superfamily Manoidea that includes two extinct genera Patriomanis and Cryptomanis. Their fossils are found in Asia and North America.

== Taxonomy ==
- Family: †Patriomanidae Szalay & Schrenk, 1998
  - Genus: †Cryptomanis Gaudin, Emry, and Pogue, 2006
    - †Cryptomanis gobiensis Gaudin, Emry, and Pogue, 2006
  - Genus: †Patriomanis Emry, 1970
    - †Patriomanis americana Emry, 1970 (american pangolin)

== Phylogeny ==
Phylogenetic position of family Patriomanidae within order Pholidota based on Rose (2026.) study:

- - outhgroup
  - Pholidotamorpha (Pholidota [sensu lato])
    - - - †Afredentata
        - †Palaeanodonta
      - †Euromanis
    - Pholidota sensu stricto
      - Eupholidota
        - †Eomanoidea
        - Manoidea
          - Manidae
          - - ?
              †Necromanis
            - †Patriomanidae
              - †Cryptomanis
                †Cryptomanis gobiensis
              - †Patriomanis
                †Patriomanis americana

== See also ==
- Mammal classification
- Manoidea
