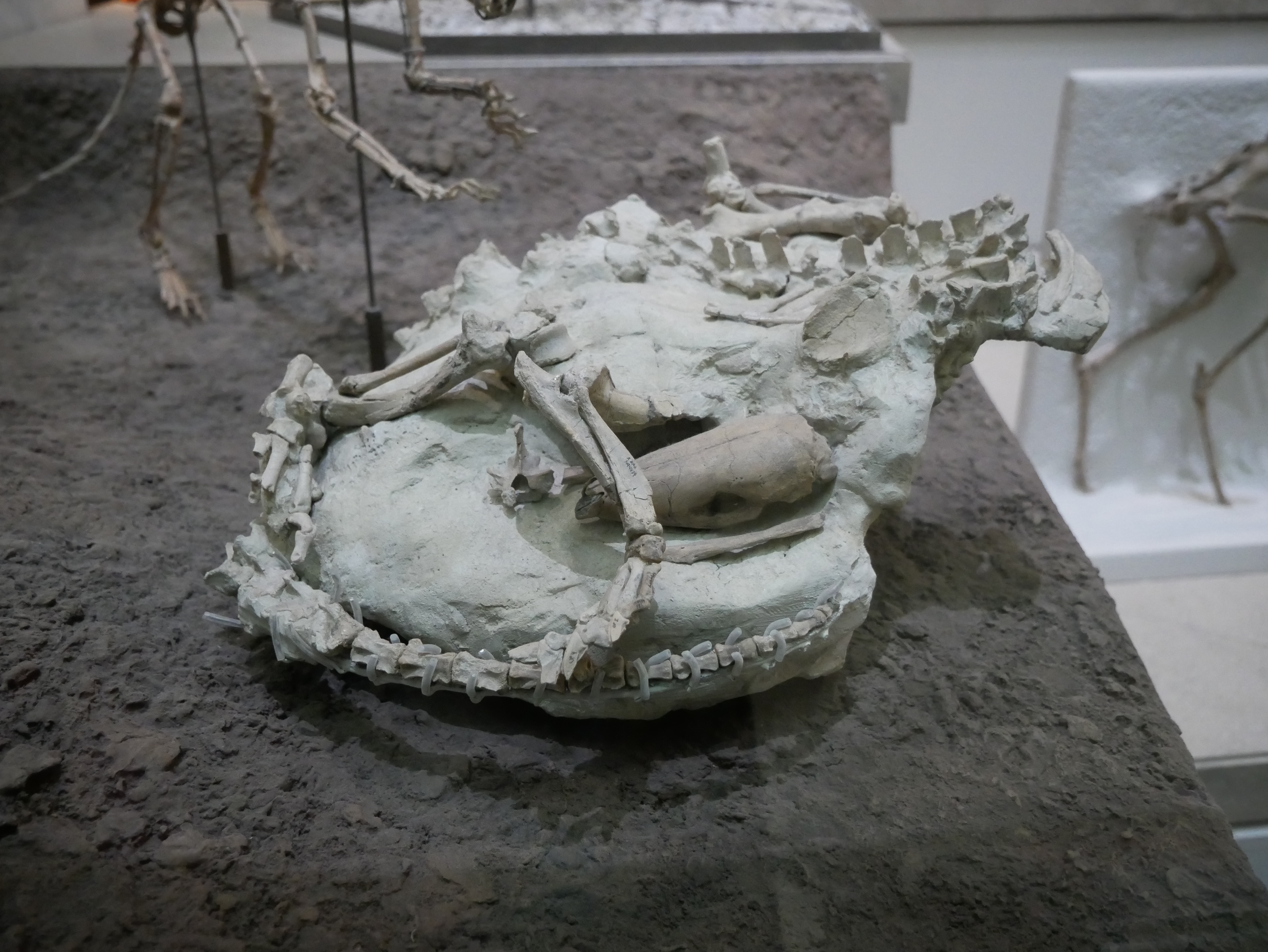
- Fossil of Patriomanis americana
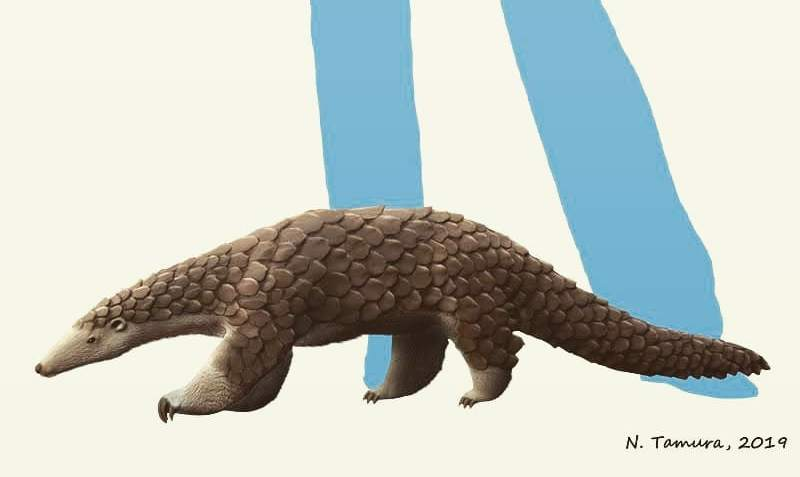
- Artist reconstruction of Patriomanis americana compared to the size of an adult human

Scientific classification
- Kingdom: Animalia
- Phylum: Chordata
- Class: Mammalia
- Infraclass: Placentalia
- Order: Pholidota
- Suborder: Eupholidota
- Superfamily: Manoidea
- Family: †Patriomanidae
- Genus: †Patriomanis; Emry, 1970

Type species
- †Patriomanis americana Emry, 1970

Synonyms
- synonyms of species: P. americana: Patriomanis americanus (Emry, 1970)

= Patriomanis =

Patriomanis Temporal range: 37.0–33.7 Ma Late Eocene to Early Oligocene

Genus of mammals

Patriomanis ("father of pangolins") is an extinct genus of pangolin from extinct family Patriomanidae. It lived from the late Eocene to early Oligocene of North America and it currently represents the only pangolin known from the Western Hemisphere. The genus contains one species, P. americana, also known as american pangolin, which is only known from six specimens, mostly from the Chadronian White River Formation of Wyoming. It had long digits and a prehensile tail, suggesting that it was arboreal, and its jaw was capable of opening wider than modern pangolins. Its ears and the hair between its scales were also longer than modern pangolins.

== Phylogeny ==
Phylogenetic position of genus Patriomanis within order Pholidota based on Rose (2026.) study:

- - outhgroup
  - Pholidotamorpha (Pholidota [sensu lato])
    - - - †Afredentata
        - †Palaeanodonta
      - †Euromanis
    - Pholidota sensu stricto
      - Eupholidota
        - †Eomanoidea
        - Manoidea
          - Manidae
          - - ?
              †Necromanis
            - †Patriomanidae
              - †Cryptomanis
              - †Patriomanis
                †Patriomanis americana

== See also ==
- Mammal classification
- Patriomanidae
