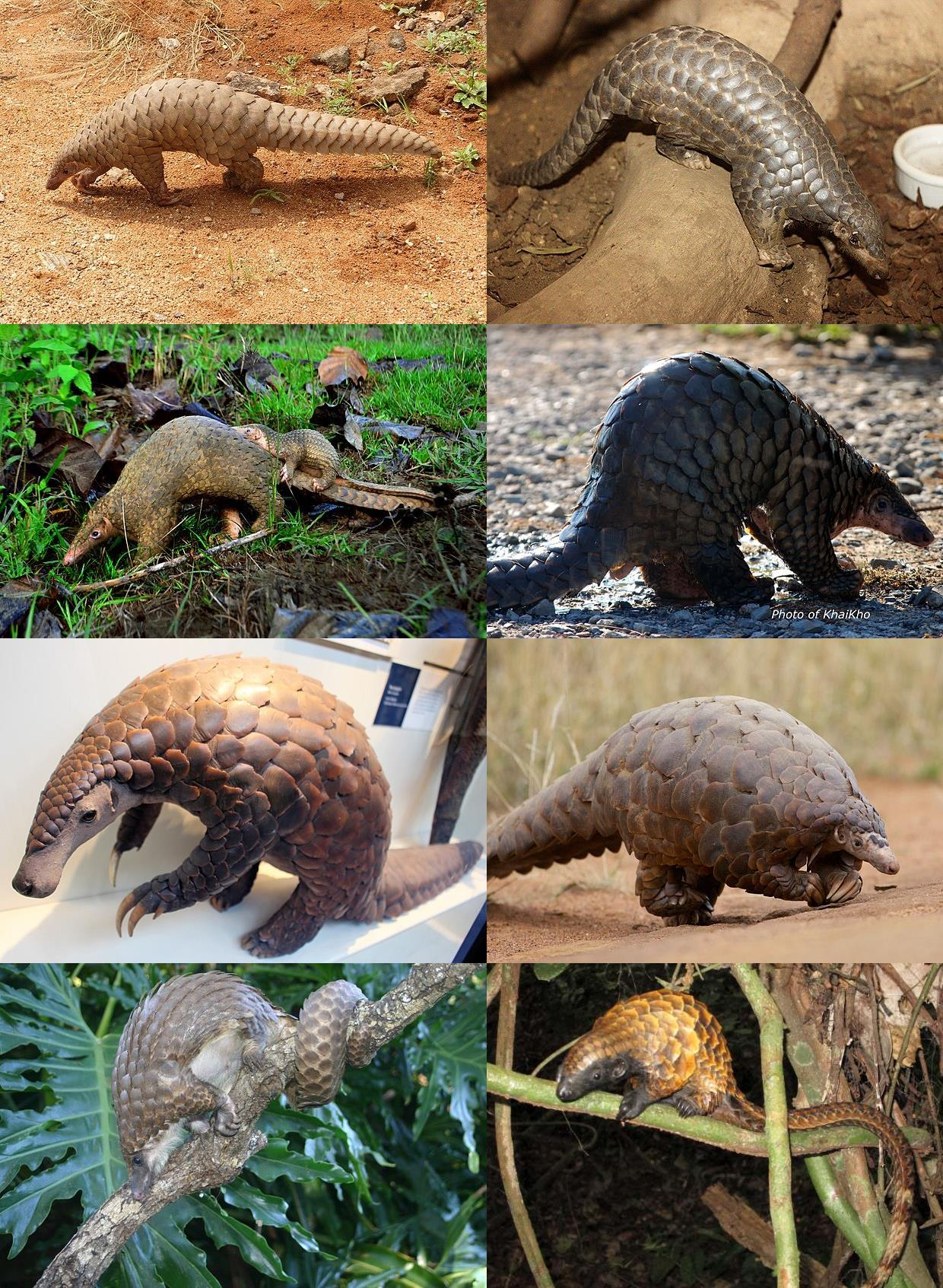
- Living pangolins
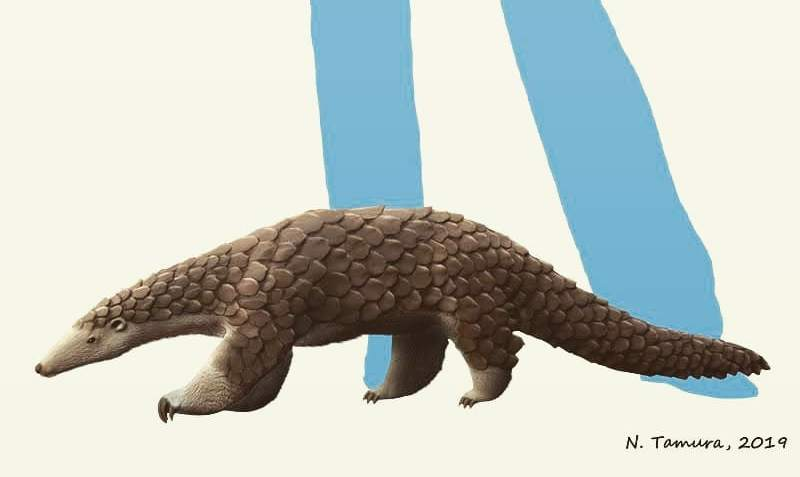
- Artist reconstruction of Patriomanis americana compared to the size of an adult human.

Scientific classification
- Kingdom: Animalia
- Phylum: Chordata
- Class: Mammalia
- Infraclass: Placentalia
- Order: Pholidota
- Suborder: Eupholidota
- Superfamily: Manoidea; Gaudin, 2009

Families
- Manidae; †Patriomanidae; Incertae sedis; Genus: †Necromanis

= Manoidea =

Manoidea Temporal range: 42.0–0 Ma Middle Eocene - Present

Superfamily of pangolins

Manoidea ("spirits") is a superfamily of pangolins from suborder Eupholidota that includes extant family Manidae, extinct family Patriomanidae and extinct genus Necromanis.

== Taxonomy ==
- Superfamily: Manoidea (Gaudin, 2009)
  - Family: Manidae (Gray, 1821) (living pangolins)
  - Family: †Patriomanidae (Szalay & Schrenk, 1998)
  - Incertae sedis
    - Genus: †Necromanis (Filhol, 1894)

== Phylogeny ==
Phylogenetic position of superfamily Manoidea within order Pholidota based on Rose (2026.) study:

- - outhgroup
  - Pholidotamorpha (Pholidota [sensu lato])
    - - - †Afredentata
        - †Palaeanodonta
      - †Euromanis
    - Pholidota sensu stricto
      - Eupholidota
        - †Eomanoidea
        - Manoidea
          - Manidae
          - - ?
              †Necromanis
            - †Patriomanidae

== See also ==
- Mammal classification
- Eupholidota
