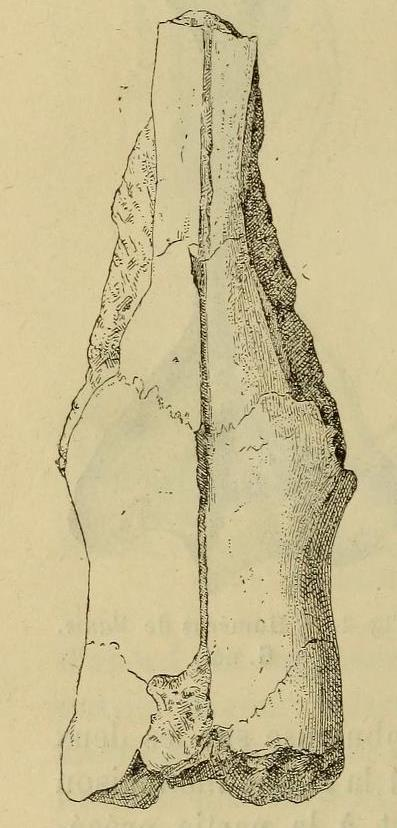
- illustration of Necromanis quercyi skull

Scientific classification
- Kingdom: Animalia
- Phylum: Chordata
- Class: Mammalia
- Infraclass: Placentalia
- Order: Pholidota
- Suborder: Eupholidota
- Superfamily: Manoidea
- Genus: †Necromanis; Filhol, 1894

Type species
- †Necromanis franconica Quenstedt, 1886

Species
- †N. franconica (Quenstedt, 1885); †N. parva (Koenigswald, 1969); †N. quercyi (Filhol, 1894)

Synonyms
- synonyms of genus: Galliaetatus (Ameghino, 1905); Leptomanis (Filhol, 1894); Necrodasypus (Filhol, 1894); Teutomanis (Ameghino, 1905); synonyms of species: N. franconica: Galliaetatus schlosseri (Ameghino, 1905); Lutra franconica (Quenstedt, 1885); Teutomanis franconica; Teutomanis quenstedti (Ameghino, 1905); N. quercyi: Leptomanis edwardsi (Filhol, 1894); Necromanis edwardsi (Koenigswald & Martin, 1990)

= Necromanis =

Necromanis Temporal range: 28.8–12.75 Ma Middle Oligocene to Middle Miocene

Extinct genus of mammals

Necromanis ("extinct pangolin") is an extinct genus of pangolin from superfamily Manoidea. It lived from the middle Oligocene to middle Miocene in Europe. It was originally placed within family Manidae, but was eventually removed from it as more fossil pholidotids from outside that family were found and studied more extensively (i.e., with the discovery and study of Eomanis and Patriomanis). Currently, Necromanis is placed as incertae sedis within the pholidotid superfamily Manoidea, together with the families Manidae and Patriomanidae.

N. quercyi was originally placed within Teutomanis by Ameghino in 1905, but was later subsumed into Necromanis. A new fossil humerus attributed to N. franconica from Quercy, France, led researchers to reaffirm Teutomanis quercyi's status as distinct from Necromanis.

== Phylogeny ==
Phylogenetic position of genus Necromanis within order Pholidota based on Rose (2026.) study:

- - outhgroup
  - Pholidotamorpha (Pholidota [sensu lato])
    - - - †Afredentata
        - †Palaeanodonta
      - †Euromanis
    - Pholidota sensu stricto
      - Eupholidota
        - †Eomanoidea
        - Manoidea
          - Manidae
          - - †Patriomanidae
            - †Necromanis ?
              - †Necromanis quercyi
              - - †Necromanis franconica
                - †Necromanis parva

== See also ==
- Mammal classification
- Manoidea
