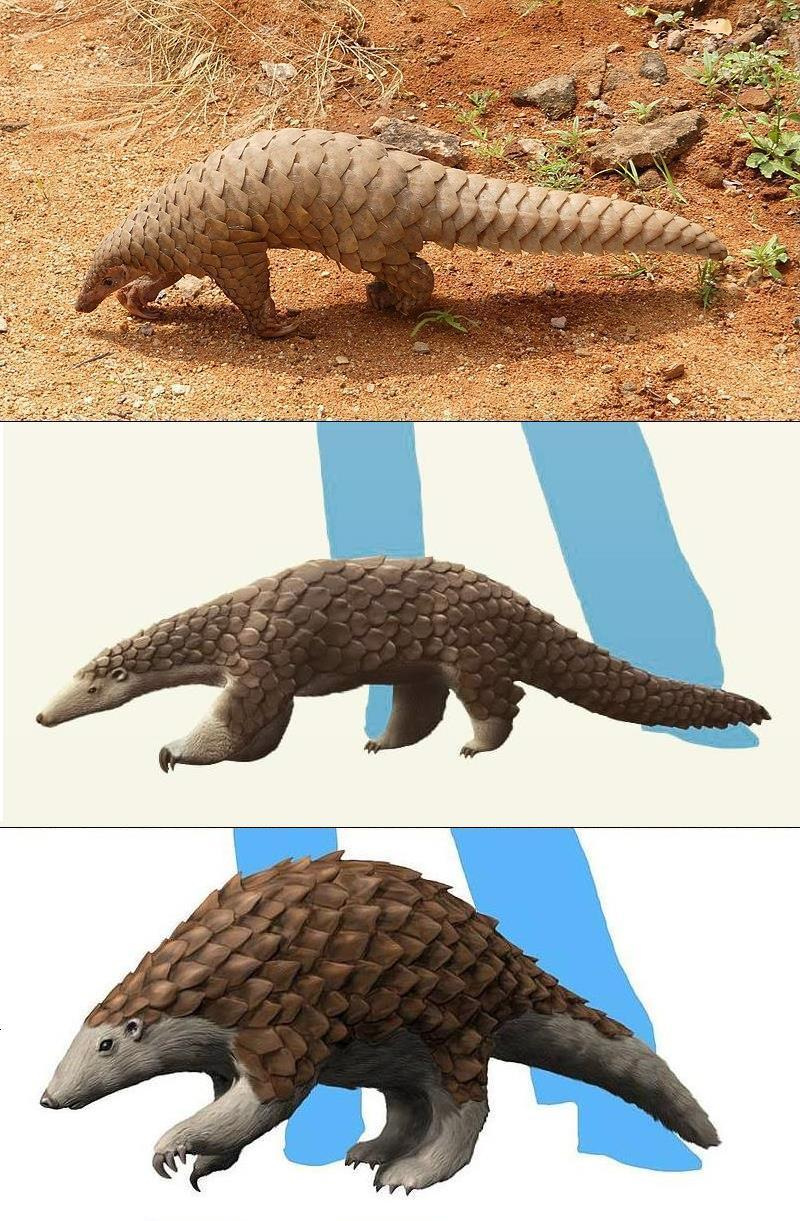
- Various living and extinct pangolin genera; from top down: Manis, Patriomanis and Eomanis

Scientific classification
- Kingdom: Animalia
- Phylum: Chordata
- Class: Mammalia
- Infraclass: Placentalia
- Clade: Pholidotamorpha
- Order: Pholidota
- Suborder: Eupholidota; Gaudin, 2009

Superfamilies
- Manoidea; †Eomanoidea

= Eupholidota =

Eupholidota Temporal range: 47.8–0 Ma Middle Eocene - Present

Suborder of pangolins

Eupholidota ("true pangolins") is a suborder of pangolins that includes two superfamilies: extant Manoidea and extinct Eomanoidea.

== Description ==
One of the main features that defines the members of the suborder Eupholidota, and which is not present in other members of the order Pholidota, is the large protective keratin scales that cover their thick skin. They are arranged like tiles over their bodies, overlapping one another to form a shell that covers the entire body except for the abdomen. Short hairs can also be found between the scales and on the rest of the body.

== Taxonomy ==
- Suborder: Eupholidota (Gaudin, 2009) (true pangolins)
  - Superfamily: Manoidea (Gaudin, 2009)
    - Family: Manidae (Gray, 1821) (living pangolins)
    - Family: †Patriomanidae (Szalay & Schrenk, 1998)
    - Incertae sedis
      - Genus: †Necromanis (Filhol, 1894)
  - Superfamily: †Eomanoidea (Gaudin, 2009)
    - Family: †Eomanidae (Storch, 2003)

== Phylogeny ==
Phylogenetic position of suborder Eupholidota within order Pholidota based on Rose (2026.) study:

- - outhgroup
  - Pholidotamorpha (Pholidota [sensu lato])
    - - - †Afredentata
        - †Palaeanodonta
      - †Euromanis
    - Pholidota sensu stricto
      - Eupholidota
        - †Eomanoidea
          †Eomanidae
        - Manoidea
          - Manidae
          - - ?
              †Necromanis
            - †Patriomanidae

== See also ==
- Mammal classification
- Pangolin
