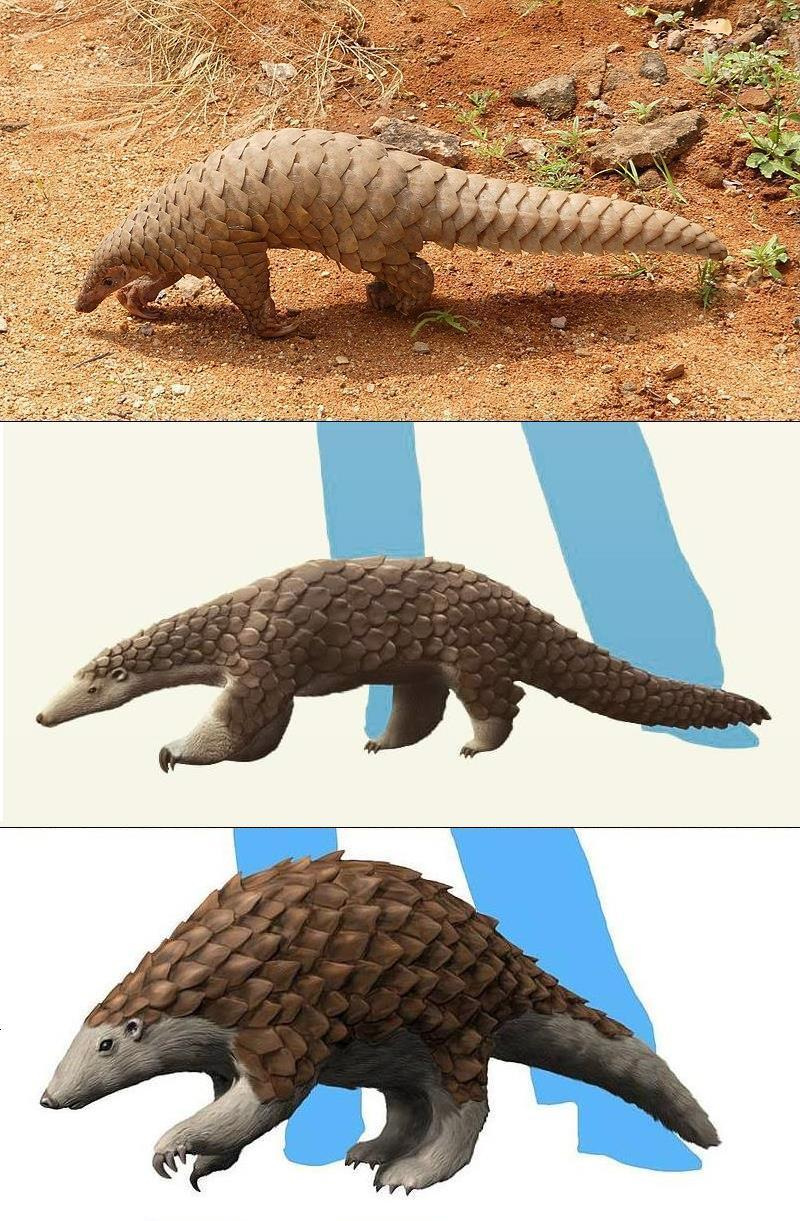
- Various living and extinct pangolin genera; from top down: Manis, Patriomanis and Eomanis

Scientific classification
- Kingdom: Animalia
- Phylum: Chordata
- Class: Mammalia
- Mirorder: Ferae
- Clade: Pholidotamorpha
- Order: Pholidota; Weber, 1904

Living genera
- Manis; Smutsia; Phataginus; For fossil groups, see text
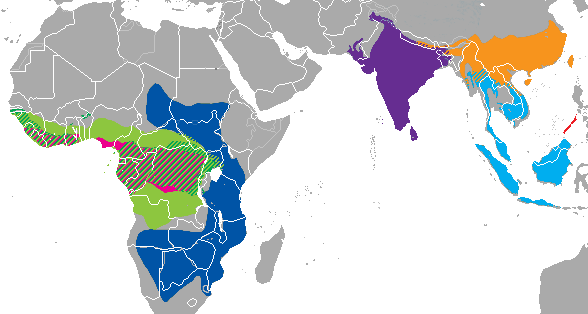
- Ranges of living species

Synonyms
- list of synonyms: Afredentata Szalay & Schrenk, 1994; Lepidota Lane, 1910; Manides Gervais, 1854; Maniformes Zagorodniuk, 2008; Manitheria Haeckel, 1895; Neomanida Haeckel, 1895; Nomarthra Cope, 1889; Pholidotheria Haeckel, 1895; Pholidotiformes Kinman, 1994; Pholidotina Pearse, 1936; Repentia Newman, 1843; Scutata Murray, 1866; Squamata Huxley, 1872; Squamigera Gill, 1910; Squamosa Haeckel, 1895

= Pangolin =

Pangolin Temporal range: 47.8–0 Ma Middle Eocene – present

Mammals of the order Pholidota

Pangolins, also called scaly anteaters, are mammals of the order Pholidota (/fɒlɪˈdoʊtə/). The one extant family, the Manidae, has three genera: Manis, Phataginus, and Smutsia. Manis comprises five species found in Asia, while Phataginus and Smutsia include two species each, all found in sub-Saharan Africa. These species range in size from 30 to 100 cm (12 to 39 in). Several extinct pangolin species are also known. In September 2023, a ninth species was reported, although it is only known from confiscated scales and has never been observed in the wild.

Pangolins have large protective keratin scales covering their skin. Depending on the species, they live in hollow trees or burrows. Pangolins are nocturnal, and their diet consists of mainly ants and termites, which they capture using their long tongues. They tend to be solitary animals, meeting only to mate and produce a litter of one to three offspring, which they raise for about two years.

Pangolins are threatened by poaching (for their meat and scales, which are used in traditional medicine) and heavy deforestation of their natural habitats, and are also the most trafficked mammals in the world. As of January 2020, there are eight species of pangolin whose conservation status is listed in the threatened tier. Three (Manis culionensis, M. pentadactyla and M. javanica) are critically endangered, three (Phataginus tricuspis, Manis crassicaudata and Smutsia gigantea) are endangered and two (Phataginus tetradactyla and Smutsia temminckii) are vulnerable on the Red List of Threatened Species of the International Union for Conservation of Nature.

== Etymology ==
The name of order Pholidota comes from Ancient Greek Φολιδωτός – "clad in scales" from φολίς pholís "scale".

The name "pangolin" comes from the Malay word pengguling meaning "one who rolls up" from guling or giling "to roll"; it was used for the Sunda pangolin (Manis javanica). However, the modern name is tenggiling. In Javanese, it is terenggiling; and in the Philippine languages, it is goling, tanggiling, or balintong (with the same meaning).

In ancient India, according to Aelian, it was known as the phattáges (φαττάγης).

== Description ==
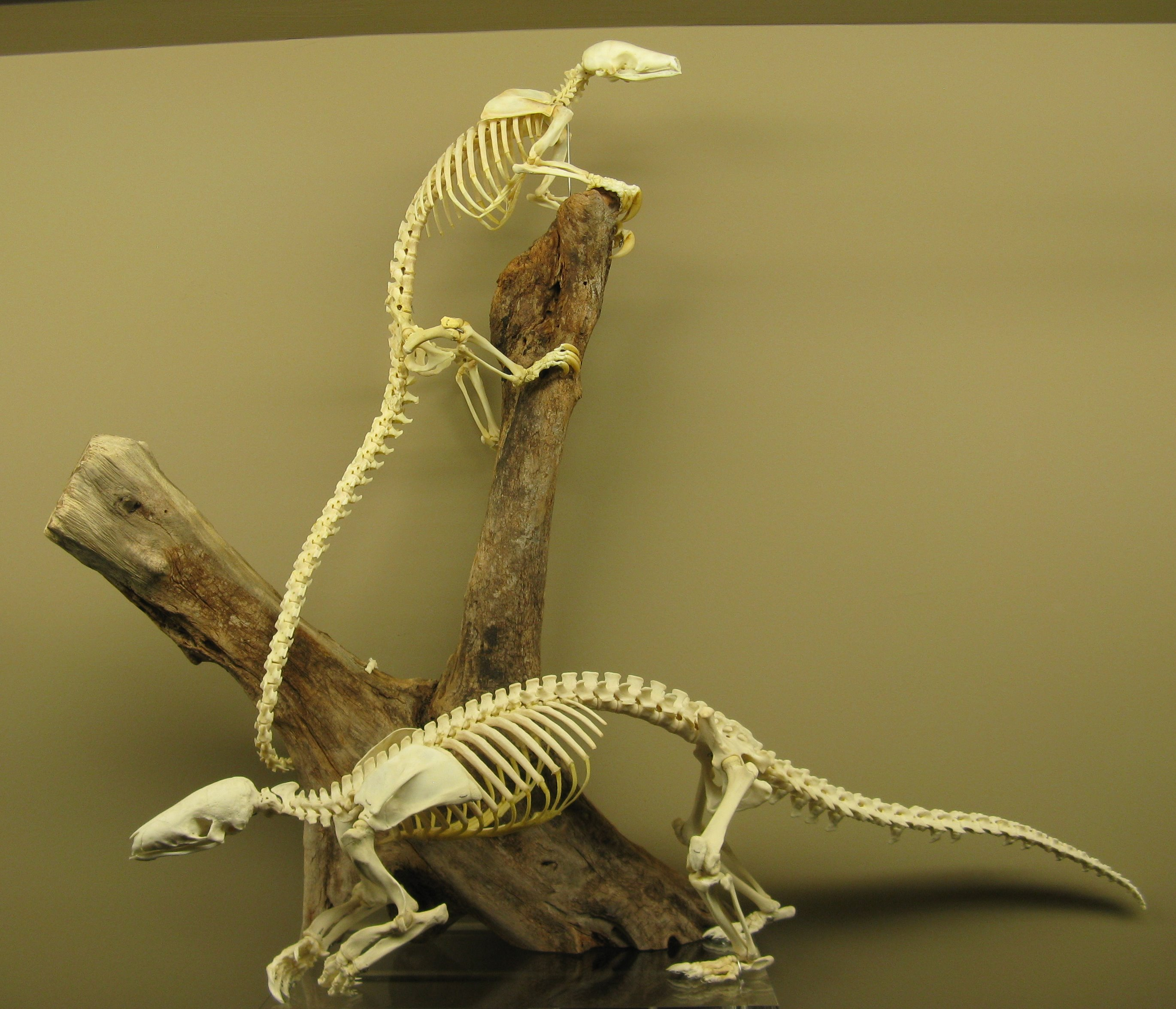
Pangolin skeletons at the Museum of Osteology (2009)

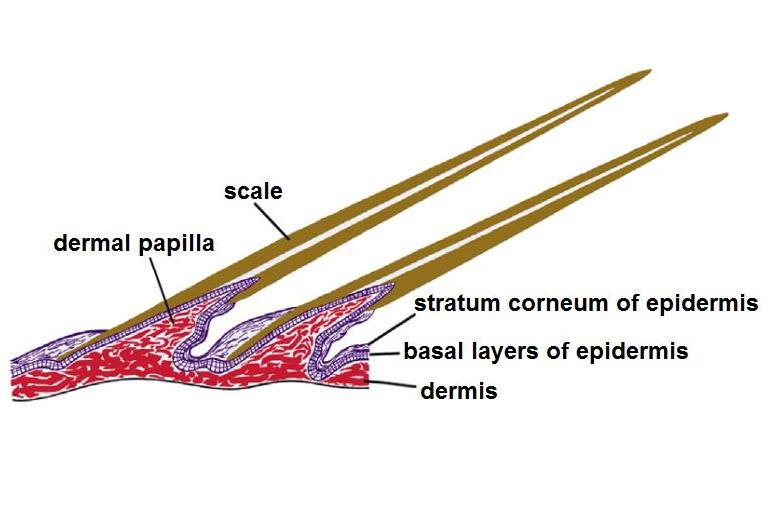
Schematic drawing of pangolin scale histology

The physical appearance of a pangolin is marked by large, hardened, overlapping, plate-like scales, which are soft on newborn pangolins, but harden as the animal matures. They are made of keratin, the same material from which human fingernails and tetrapod claws are made, and are structurally and compositionally very different from the scales of reptiles. The pangolin's scaled body is comparable in appearance to a pine cone. It can curl up into a ball when threatened, with its overlapping scales acting as armor, while it protects its face by tucking it under its tail. The scales are sharp, providing extra defense from predators. Despite their appearance, they are not closely related to armadillos, having both evolved scales by convergent evolution.

Pangolins can emit a noxious-smelling chemical from glands near the anus, similar to the spray of a skunk. They have short legs, with sharp claws which they use for burrowing into ant and termite mounds and for climbing.

The tongues of pangolins are extremely long, and like those of the giant anteater and the tube-lipped nectar bat, the root of the tongue is not attached to the hyoid bone but is in the thorax between the sternum and the trachea. Large pangolins can extend their tongues as much as 40 cm (16 in), with a diameter of only about 0.5 cm (1/5 in).

== Behaviour ==
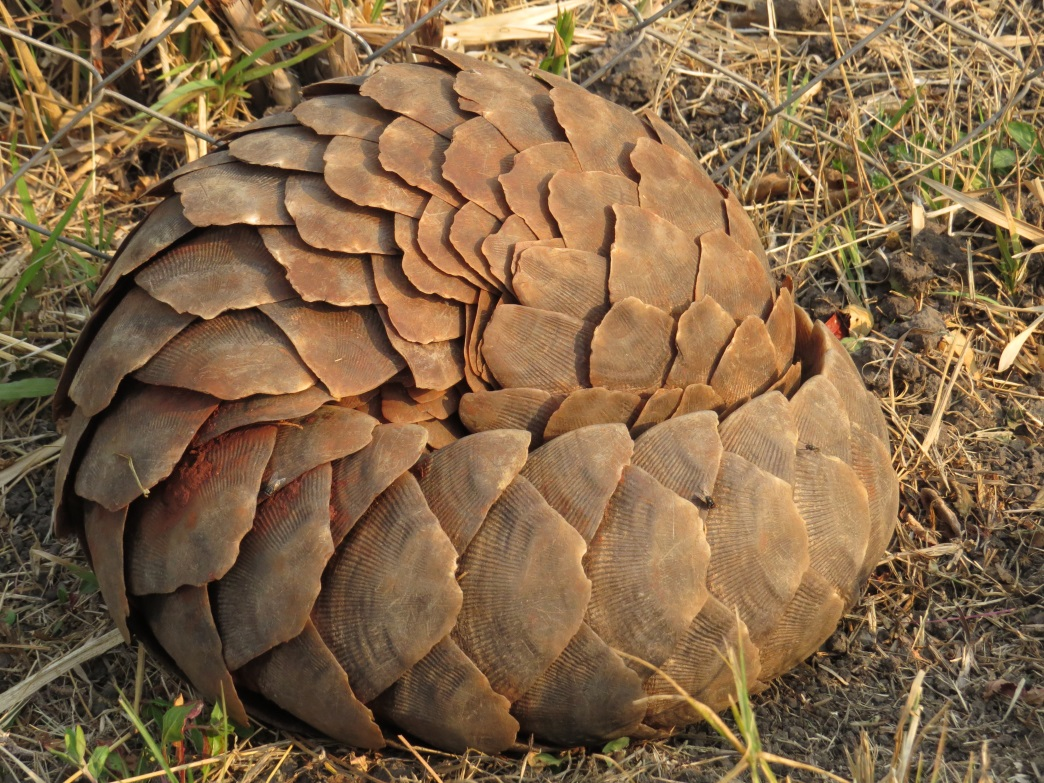
Ground pangolin in defensive posture

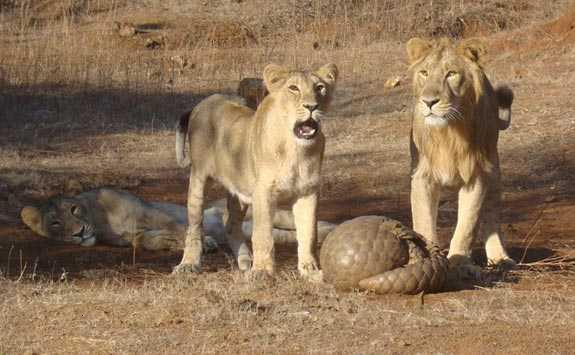
Indian pangolin defending itself against Asiatic lions

Most pangolins are nocturnal animals which use their well-developed sense of smell to find insects. The long-tailed pangolin is also active by day, while other species of pangolins spend most of the daytime sleeping, curled up into a ball ("volvation").

Arboreal pangolins live in hollow trees, whereas the ground-dwelling species dig tunnels to a depth of 3.5 m (11 ft).

Some pangolins walk with their front claws bent under the foot pad, although they use the entire foot pad on their rear limbs. Furthermore, some exhibit a bipedal stance for some behavior, and may walk a few steps bipedally. Pangolins are also good swimmers.

=== Diet ===
Pangolins are insectivorous. Most of their diet consists of various species of ants and termites and may be supplemented by other insects, especially larvae. They are somewhat particular and tend to consume only one or two species of insects, even when many species are available. A pangolin can consume 140–200 g (5–7 oz) of insects per day. Pangolins are an important regulator of termite populations in their natural habitats.

Pangolins have very poor vision. They also lack teeth. They rely heavily on smell and hearing, and they have other physical characteristics to help them eat ants and termites. Their skeletal structure is sturdy and they have strong front legs used for tearing into termite mounds. They use their powerful front claws to dig into trees, soil, and vegetation to find prey, then proceed to use their long tongues to probe inside the insect tunnels and to retrieve their prey.

The structure of their tongue and stomach is key to aiding pangolins in obtaining and digesting insects. Their saliva is sticky, causing ants and termites to stick to their long tongues when they are hunting through insect tunnels. However, without teeth, pangolins cannot chew; so while foraging, they ingest small stones (gastroliths), which accumulate in their stomachs to help to grind up ants. This part of their stomach is called the gizzard, and it is also covered in keratinous spines. These spines further aid in the grinding up and digestion of the pangolin's prey.

Some species, such as the tree pangolin, use their strong, prehensile tails to hang from tree branches and strip away bark from the trunk, exposing insect nests inside.

=== Reproduction ===
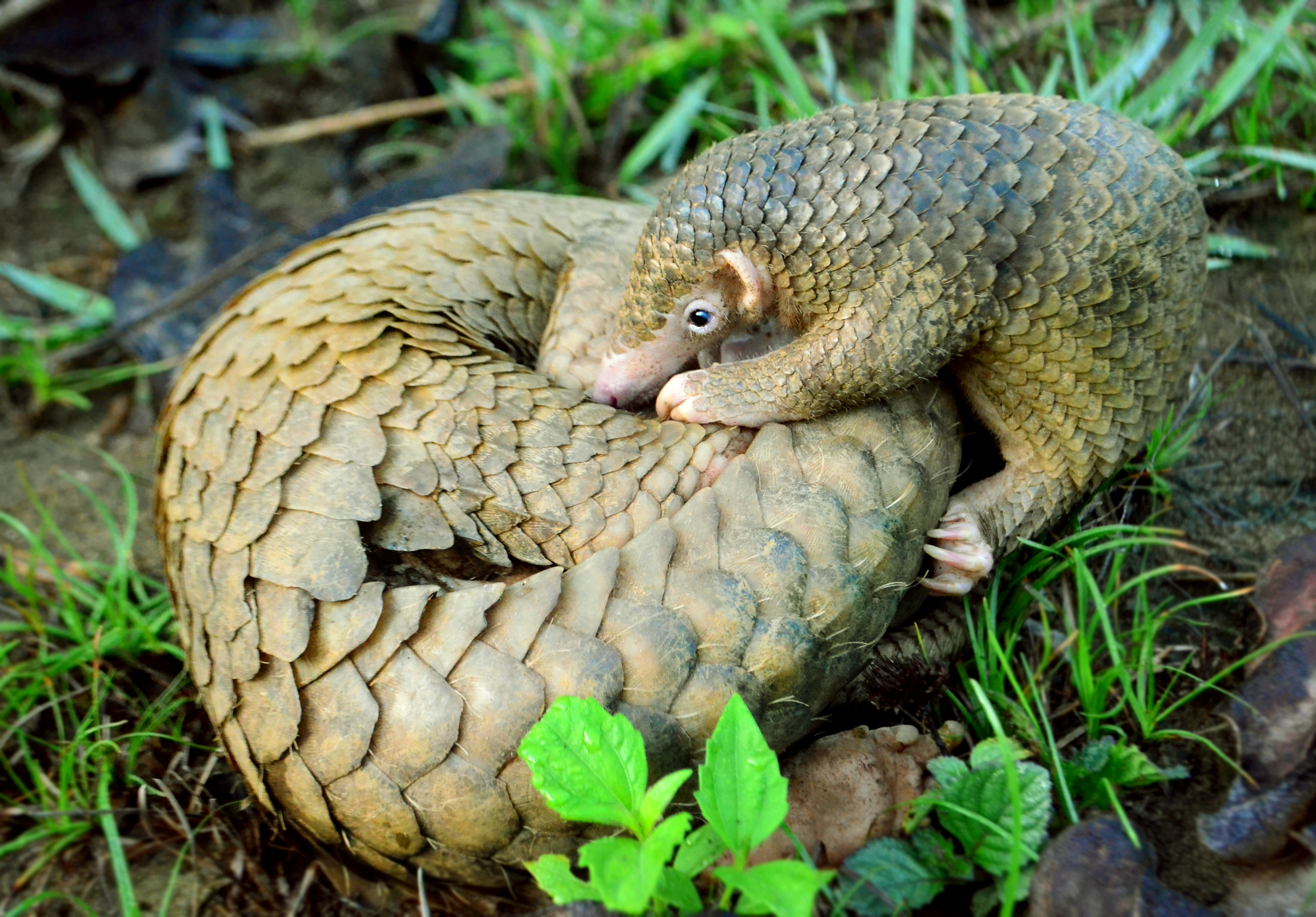
A Philippine pangolin pup and its mother, a critically endangered species endemic to the Palawan island group. It is threatened by illegal poaching for the pangolin trade to China and Vietnam, where it is regarded as a luxury medicinal delicacy.

Pangolins are solitary and meet only to reproduce, with mating typically taking place at night after the male and female pangolin meet near a watering hole. Males are larger than females, weighing up to 40% more. While the mating season is not defined, they typically mate once each year, usually during the summer or autumn. Rather than the males seeking out the females, males mark their location with urine or feces and the females find them. If competition over a female occurs, the males use their tails as clubs to fight for the opportunity to mate with her.

Gestation periods differ by species, ranging from roughly 70 to 140 days. African pangolin females usually give birth to a single offspring at a time, but the Asiatic species may give birth to from one to three. Weight at birth is 80 to 450 g (2 3/4 to 15 3/4 oz), and the average length is 150 mm (6 in). At the time of birth, the scales are soft and white. After several days, they harden and darken to resemble those of an adult pangolin. During the vulnerable stage, the mother stays with her offspring in the burrow, nursing it, and wraps her body around it if she senses danger. The young cling to the mother's tail as she moves about, although, in burrowing species, they remain in the burrow for the first two to four weeks of life. At one month, they first leave the burrow riding on the mother's back. Weaning takes place around three months of age, when the young begin to eat insects in addition to nursing. At two years of age, the offspring are sexually mature and are abandoned by the mother.

== Classification and phylogeny ==
=== Taxonomy ===
Former classification:	Current classification:
Order: Pholidota (Weber, 1904) (pangolins); Family: Manidae (Gray, 1821) (living pangolins); Family: †Eomanidae (Storch, 2003); Family: †Patriomanidae (Szalay & Schrenk, 1998); Suborder: †Palaeanodonta (Matthew, 1918) (stem-pangolins); Family: †Epoicotheriidae (Simpson, 1927); Family: †Escavadodontidae (Rose & Lucas, 2000); Family: †Metacheiromyidae (Wortman, 1903); Incertae sedis: Genus: †Arcticanodon (Rose, 2004); Genus: †Melaniella (Fox, 1984); Suborder: †Ernanodonta (Ding, 1979); Family: †Ernanodontidae (Ding, 1979)	Order: Pholidota (Weber, 1904) (pangolins); Suborder: Eupholidota (Gaudin, Emry & Wible, 2009) (true pangolins); Superfamily: Manoidea (Gaudin, Emry & Wible, 2009); Family: Manidae (Gray, 1821) (living pangolins); Family: †Patriomanidae (Szalay & Schrenk, 1998 [sensu Gaudin, Emry & Pogue, 2006]); Incertae sedis; Genus: †Necromanis (Filhol, 1893); Superfamily: †Eomanoidea (Gaudin, Emry & Wible, 2009); Family: †Eomanidae (Storch, 2003); Incertae sedis: †Pholidota sp. (BC 16’08) (Pickford, 2008)

=== Summary of extant species ===
Common name	Binomial name	Population	Status	Trend	Notes	Image
Cryptic pangolin	Manis mysteria	unknown	NE	▼	Identified via genetic analyses in 2023. Species has not been assessed by IUCN.	
Philippine pangolin	Manis culionensis	unknown	CR	▼		
Sunda pangolin	Manis javanica	unknown	CR	▼	Population in Singapore is estimated to be 1,068 individuals. Thousands of this species are estimated to be illegally exported annually.	
Chinese pangolin	Manis pentadactyla	45,000-120,000	CR	▼	Values given are a very rough estimate given various, disjointed national estimates. Some taxonomists split another species, the Indo Burmese pangolin, from this species; IUCN currently retains it as a subspecies of M. pentadactyla.	
Indian pangolin	Manis crassicaudata	unknown	EN	▼	Species is heavily threatened by exportation for illegal wildlife trade.	
White-bellied pangolin	Phataginus tricuspis	unknown	EN	▼	The scales of >400,000 individuals were seized from illegal wildlife trade between 2015-2019.	
Giant ground pangolin (Giant pangolin)	Smutsia gigantea	unknown	EN	▼		
Black-bellied pangolin (Long-tailed pangolin)	Phataginus tetradactyla	unknown	VU	▼		
Temminck's ground pangolin (Ground pangolin)	Smutsia temminckii	unknown	VU	▼	Population of this species over its South African range is estimated to be 16,329–24,102 mature individuals.	

=== Phylogeny ===
==== Among placentals ====
The order Pholidota was long considered to be the sister taxon to Xenarthra (neotropical anteaters, sloths, and armadillos), but recent genetic evidence indicates their closest living relatives are the carnivorans, with which they form a clade, the Ferae. Palaeanodonts are even closer relatives to pangolins, being classified with pangolins in the clade Pholidotamorpha. The split between carnivoran and pangolin lineages is estimated to have occurred 75.31 Ma (million years) ago.

Cladogram of pangolin phylogeny within order Pholidota
Based on Kondrashov & Agadjanian (2012.) study:

- - - Eulipotyphla
      Erinaceus
  - - Carnivora
      Nandinia
    - Pholidotamorpha (Pholidota [sensu lato])
      - †Palaeanodonta
      - Pholidota sensu stricto
        - †Euromanis
        - - †Afredentata
            †Eurotamanduidae
          - Eupholidota
            - †Eomanoidea
              †Eomanidae
            - Manoidea
              - †Patriomanidae
              - ?
                †Necromanis
              - Manidae

Based on Rose (2026.) study:

- - outhgroup
  - Pholidotamorpha (Pholidota [sensu lato])
    - - - †Afredentata
        - †Palaeanodonta
      - †Euromanis
    - Pholidota sensu stricto
      - Eupholidota
        - †Eomanoidea
          †Eomanidae
        - Manoidea
          - Manidae
          - - ?
              †Necromanis
            - †Patriomanidae

==== Among Manidae ====
The first dichotomy in the phylogeny of extant Manidae separates Asian pangolins (Manis) from African pangolins (Smutsia and Phataginus). Within the former, Manis pentadactyla is the sister group to a clade comprising M. crassicaudata and M. javanica. Within the latter, a split separates the large terrestrial African pangolins of the genus Smutsia from the small arboreal African pangolins of the genus Phataginus.

Asian and African pangolins are thought to have diverged about 38.05 Ma ago. Moreover, the basal position of Manis within Pholidota suggests the group originated in Eurasia, consistent with their laurasiatherian phylogeny.

Cladogram of living pangolins after Wangmo (2025.) study:

- - outhgroup
  - Manidae
    - Maninae
      - Manis
        - - - (Paramanis)
              - Manis culionensis
              - Manis javanica
            - Manis mysteria
          - Manis crassicaudata
        - - Manis indoburmanica
          - Manis pentadactyla
    - Smutsiinae sensu lato
      - Phatagininae
        - Phataginus
          - Phataginus tetradactyla
          - Phataginus tricuspis
      - Smutsiinae sensu stricto
        - Smutsia
          - Smutsia gigantea
          - Smutsia temminckii

== Threats ==
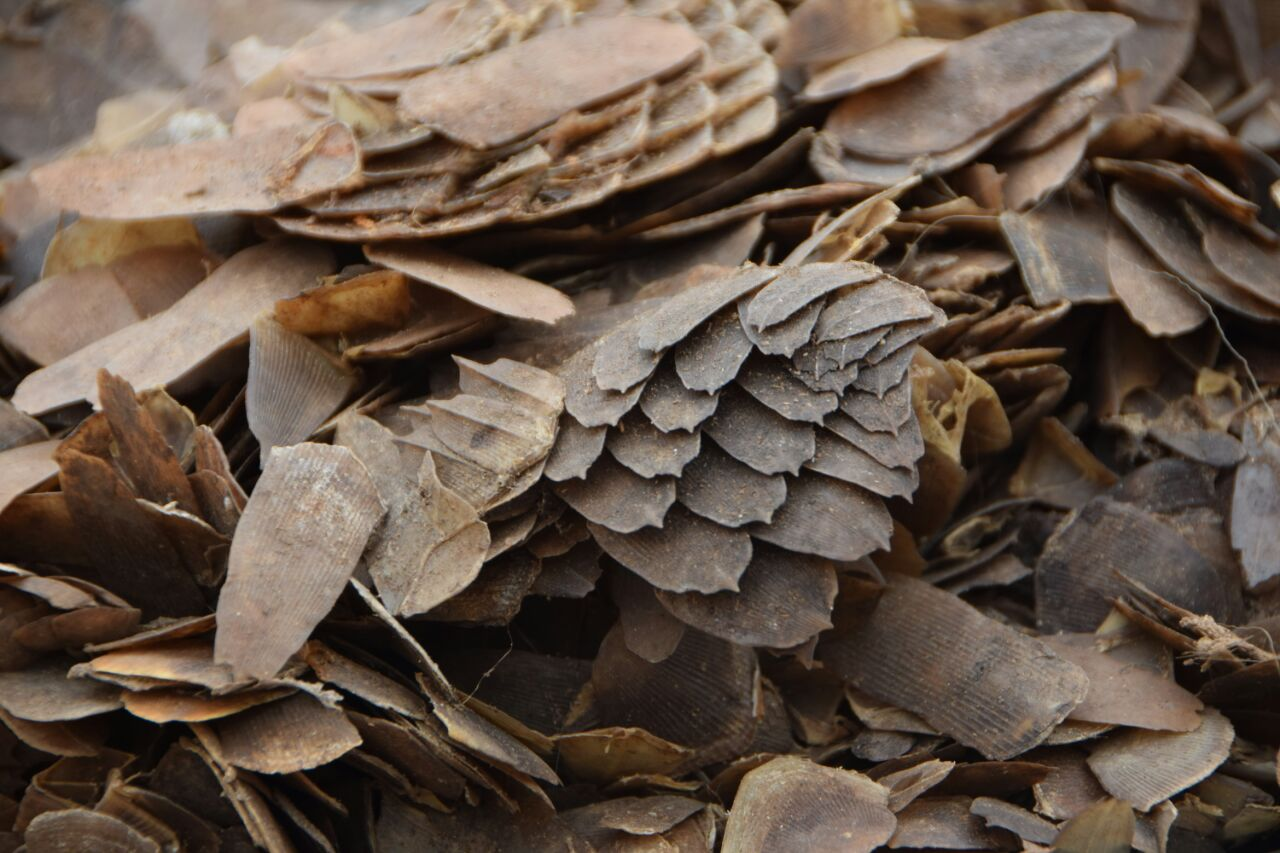
Confiscated black market pangolin scales, which are in high demand in traditional Chinese medicine, which were destroyed by authorities in Cameroon in 2017

Pangolins are in high demand in southern China and Vietnam because their scales are believed to have medicinal properties in traditional Chinese and Vietnamese medicine. Their meat is also considered a delicacy. 100,000 are estimated to be trafficked a year to China and Vietnam, amounting to over one million over the past decade. This makes them the most trafficked animal in the world. This, coupled with deforestation, has led to a large decrease in the numbers of pangolins. Some species, such as Manis pentadactyla have become commercially extinct in certain ranges as a result of overhunting.

In November 2010, pangolins were added to the Zoological Society of London's list of evolutionarily distinct and endangered mammals. All eight species of pangolin are assessed as threatened by the IUCN, while three are classified as critically endangered. All pangolin species are currently listed under Appendix I of CITES which prohibits international trade, except when the product is intended for non-commercial purposes and a permit has been granted.

China had been the main destination country for pangolins until 2018, where it was surpassed by Vietnam. In 2019, Vietnam was reported to have seized the largest volumes of pangolin scales, surpassing Nigeria that year.

Pangolins are also hunted and eaten in Ghana and are one of the more popular types of bushmeat, while local healers use the pangolin as a source of traditional medicine. A 2025 study in Nature Ecology & Evolution found that opportunistic hunting for meat, rather than hunting for scales used in traditional medicine, is the primary driver of pangolin population declines in Nigeria.

Though pangolins are protected by an international ban on their trade, populations have suffered from illegal trafficking due to beliefs in East Asia that their ground-up scales can stimulate lactation or cure cancer or asthma. In the past decade, numerous seizures of illegally trafficked pangolin and pangolin meat have taken place in Asia. In one such incident in April 2013, 10,000 kg (22,000 pounds) of pangolin meat were seized from a Chinese vessel that ran aground in the Philippines. In another case in August 2016, an Indonesian man was arrested after police raided his home and found over 650 pangolins in freezers on his property. The same threat is reported in Nigeria, where the animal is on the verge of extinction due to overexploitation. The overexploitation comes from hunting pangolins for game meat and the reduction of their forest habitats due to deforestation caused by timber harvesting. The pangolin are hunted as game meat for both medicinal purposes and food consumption.

== Virology ==
=== COVID-19 infection ===
The nucleic acid sequence of a specific receptor-binding domain of the spike protein belonging to coronaviruses taken from pangolins was found to be a 99% match with SARS coronavirus 2 (SARS-CoV-2), the virus which causes COVID-19 and is responsible for the COVID-19 pandemic. Researchers in Guangzhou, China, hypothesized that SARS-CoV-2 had originated in bats, and prior to infecting humans, was circulating among pangolins. The illicit Chinese trade of pangolins for use in traditional Chinese medicine was suggested as a vector for human transmission. However, whole-genome comparison found that the pangolin and human coronaviruses share only up to 92% of their RNA. Ecologists worried that the early speculation about pangolins being the source may have led to mass slaughters, endangering them further, which was similar to what happened to Asian palm civets during the SARS outbreak. It was later proved that the testing which suggested that pangolins were a potential host for the virus was flawed, when genetic analysis showed that the spike protein and its binding to receptors in pangolins had minimal effect from the virus, and therefore were not likely mechanisms for COVID-19 infections in humans.

=== Pestivirus and Coltivirus ===
In 2020, two novel RNA viruses distantly related to pestiviruses and coltiviruses have been detected in the genomes of dead Manis javanica and Manis pentadactyla. To refer to both sampling site and hosts, they were named Dongyang pangolin virus (DYPV) and Lishui pangolin virus (LSPV). The DYPV pestivirus was also identified in Amblyomma javanense nymph ticks from a diseased pangolin.

In addition to pestiviruses and coltiviruses, genomic surveys of healthy pangolins have revealed the presence of multiple potentially zoonotic viruses, including coronaviruses, flaviviruses, and circoviruses, indicating that pangolins naturally harbor diverse viral communities without showing disease symptoms.

== Folk medicine ==
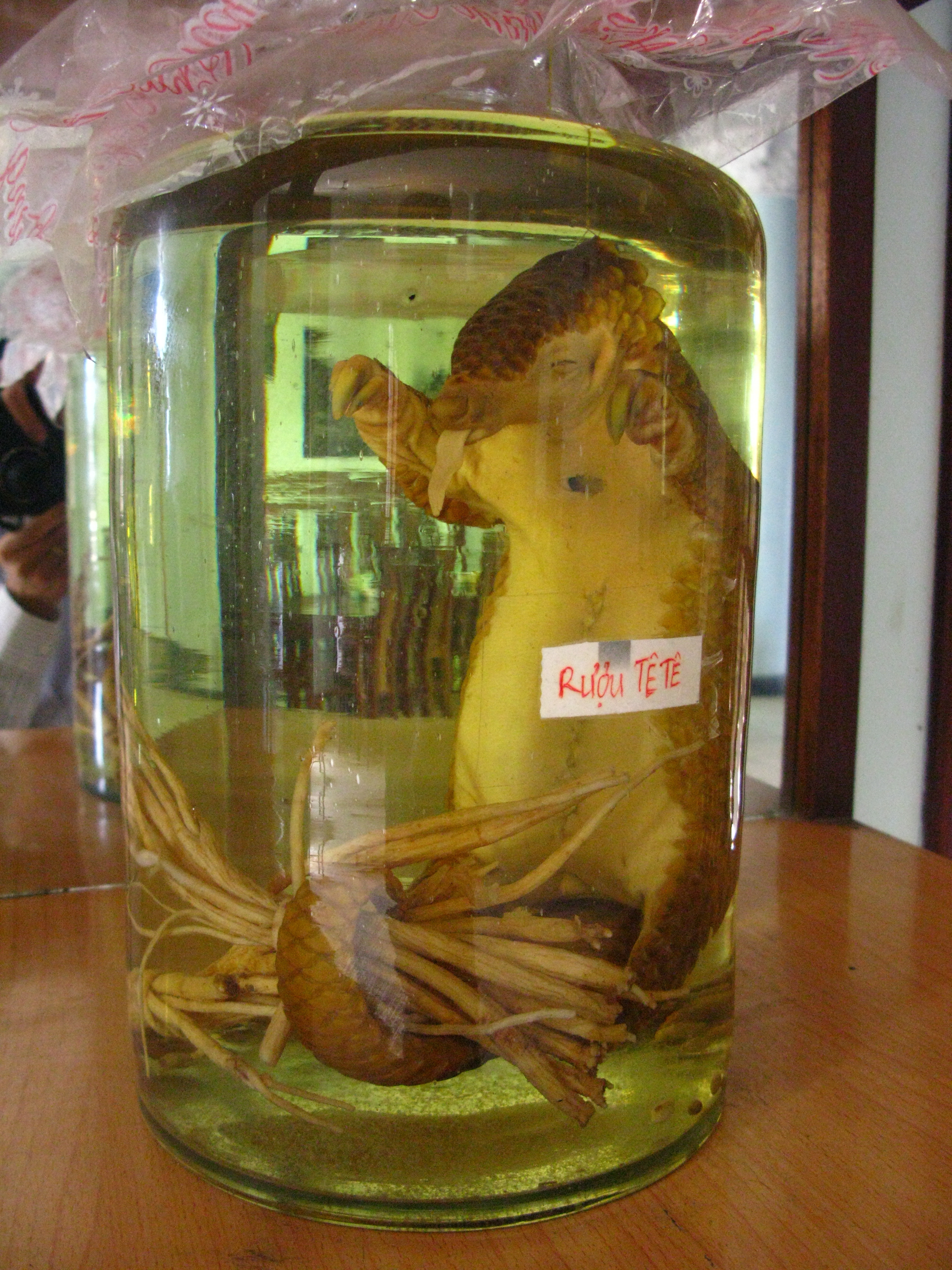
Pangolins are threatened by illegal hunting and trading due to their use in folk medicine.

Pangolin scales and flesh are used as ingredients for various traditional Chinese medicine preparations. While no scientific evidence exists for the efficacy of those practices, and they have no logical mechanism of action, their popularity still drives the black market for animal body parts, despite concerns about toxicity, transmission of diseases from animals to humans, and species extermination. The ongoing demand for parts as ingredients continues to fuel pangolin poaching, hunting and trading.

The first record of pangolin scales occurs in Ben Cao Jinji Zhu ("Variorum of Shennong's Classic of Materia Medica", 500 CE), which recommends pangolin scales for protection against ant bites; burning the scales as a cure for people crying hysterically during the night. During the Tang dynasty, a recipe for expelling evil spirits with a formulation of scales, herbs, and minerals appeared in 682, and in 752 CE the idea that pangolin scales could also stimulate milk secretion in lactating women, one of the main uses today, was recommended in the Wai Tai Mi Yao ("Arcane Essentials from the Imperial Library"). In the Song dynasty, the notion of penetrating and clearing blockages was emphasized in the Taiping sheng hui fan ("Formulas from Benevolent Sages Compiled During the Era of Peace and Tranquility"), compiled by Wang Huaiyin in 992.

In the 21st century, the main uses of pangolin scales are quackery practices based on unproven claims the scales dissolve blood clots, promote blood circulation, or help lactating women secrete milk. The supposed health effects of pangolin meat and scales claimed by folk medicine practitioners are based on their consumption of ants, long tongues, and protective scales. The Pharmacopoeia of the People's Republic of China included Chinese pangolin scales as an ingredient in traditional Chinese medicine formulations. Pangolins were removed from the Pharmacopoeia starting from the first half of 2020. Although pangolin scales have been removed from the list of raw ingredients, the scales are still listed as a key ingredient in various medicines.

Pangolin parts are also used for medicinal purposes in other Asian countries such as India, Nepal and Pakistan. In some parts of India and Nepal, locals believe that wearing the scales of a pangolin can help prevent pneumonia. Pangolin scales have also been used for medicinal purposes in Malaysia, Indonesia and northern Myanmar. Indigenous people in southern Palawan, Philippines, have held the belief that elders could avoid prostate illnesses by wearing belts made with the scales.

== Conservation ==
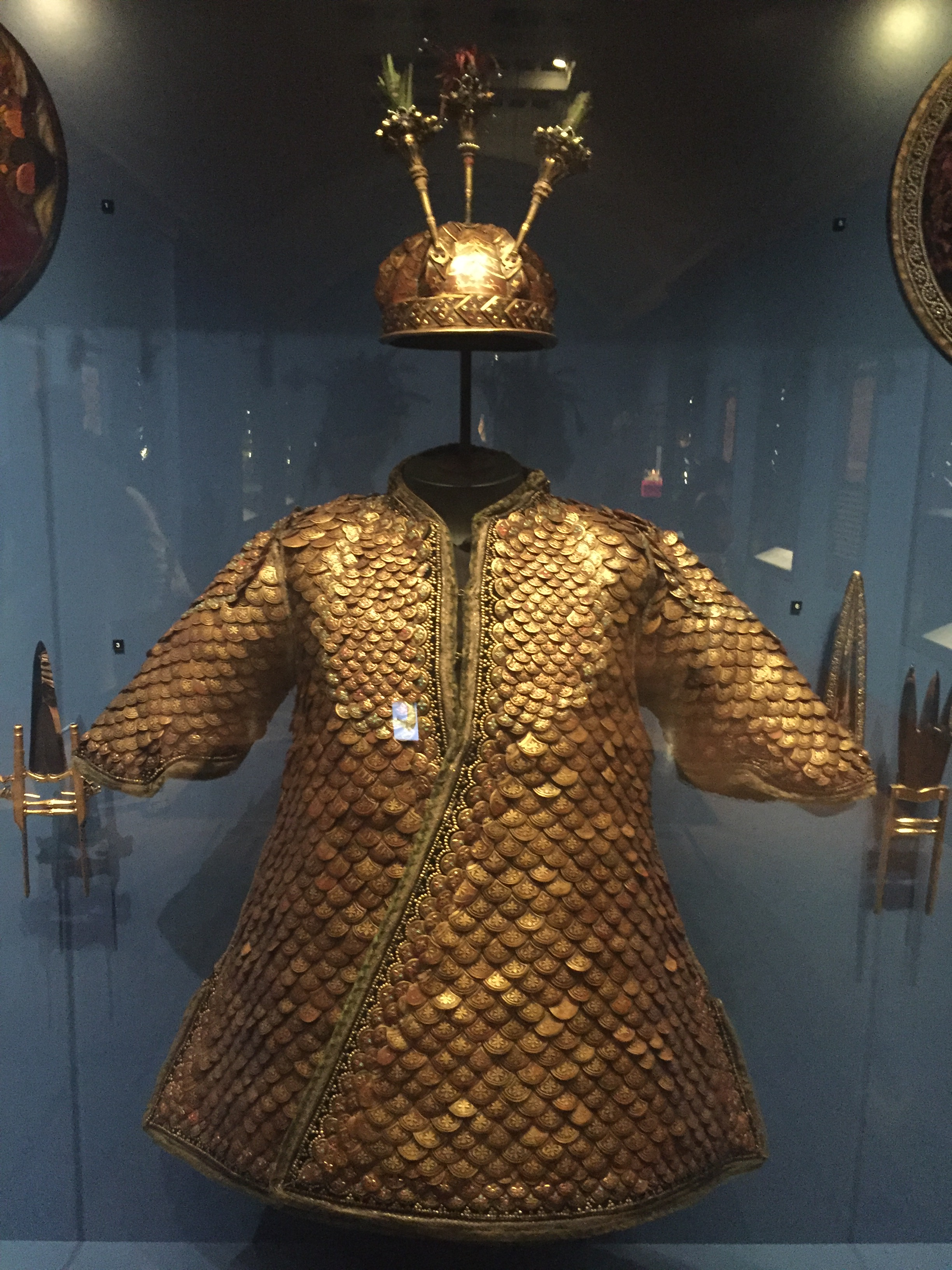
A coat of armour made of gilded pangolin scales from India, presented in 1875–76 to the then Prince of Wales, the later Edward VII.

As a result of increasing threats to pangolins, mainly in the form of illegal, international trade in pangolin skin, scales, and meat, these species have received increasing conservation attention in recent years. As of January 2020, the IUCN considered all eight species of pangolin on its Red List of Threatened Species as threatened. The IUCN SSC Pangolin Specialist Group launched a global action plan to conserve pangolins, dubbed "Scaling up Pangolin Conservation", in July 2014. This action plan aims to improve all aspects of pangolin conservation with an added emphasis on combating poaching and trafficking of the animal while educating communities on its importance.

Another suggested approach to fighting pangolin (and general wildlife) trafficking consists in "following the money" rather than "the animal", which aims to disrupt smugglers' profits by interrupting money flows. Financial intelligence gathering could thus become a key tool in protecting these animals, although this opportunity is often overlooked. In 2018, a Chinese NGO launched the Counting Pangolins movement, calling for joint efforts to save the mammals from trafficking. Wildlife conservation group TRAFFIC has identified 159 smuggling routes used by pangolin traffickers and aims to shut these down.

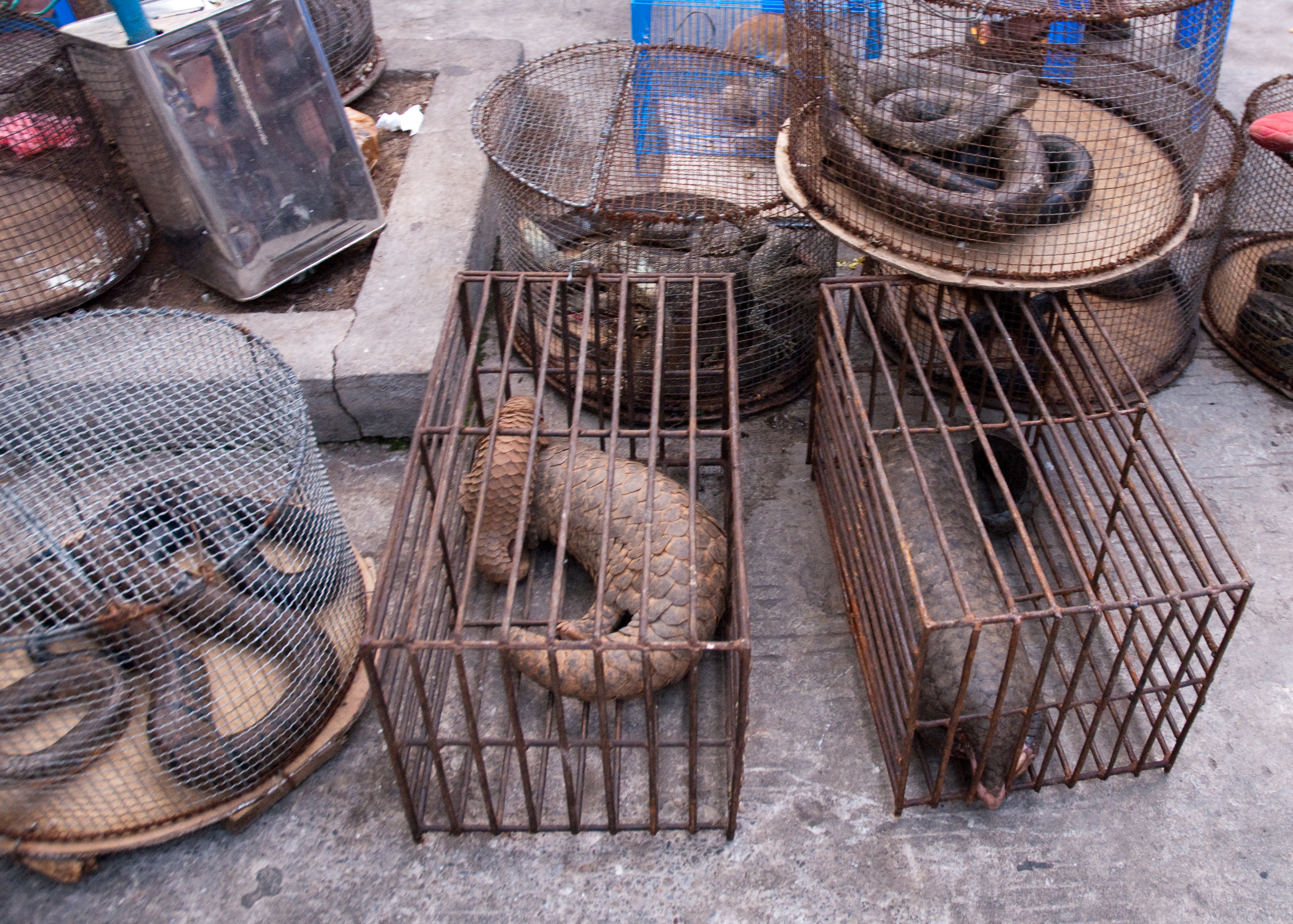
Pangolins (in rectangular cages) in an illegal wildlife market in Myanmar

Many attempts have been made to breed pangolins in captivity, but due to their reliance on wide-ranging habitats and very particular diets, these attempts are often unsuccessful. Pangolins have significantly decreased immune responses due to a genetic dysfunction, making them extremely fragile. They are susceptible to diseases such as pneumonia and the development of ulcers in captivity, complications that can lead to an early death. In addition, pangolins rescued from illegal trade often have a higher chance of being infected with parasites such as intestinal worms, further lessening their chance for rehabilitation and reintroduction to the wild.

The idea of farming pangolins to reduce the number being illegally trafficked is being explored with little success. The third Saturday in February is promoted as World Pangolin Day by the conservation NPO Annamiticus. World Pangolin Day has been noted for its effectiveness in generating awareness about pangolins.

In 2017, Jackie Chan made a public service announcement called WildAid: Jackie Chan & Pangolins (Kung Fu Pangolin).

In December 2020, a study found that it is "not too late" to establish conservation efforts for Philippine pangolins (Manis culionensis), a species that is only found on the island province of Palawan.

=== Taiwan ===
Taiwan is one of the few conservation grounds for pangolins in the world after the country enacted the 1989 Wildlife Conservation Act. The introduction of Wildlife Rehabilitation Centers in places like Luanshan (Yanping Township) in Taitung and Xiulin townships in Hualien became important communities for protecting pangolins and their habitats and has greatly improved the survival of pangolins. These centers work with local aboriginal tribes and forest police in the National Police Agency to prevent poaching, trafficking, and smuggling of pangolins, especially to black markets in China. These centers have also helped to reveal the causes of death and injury among Taiwan's pangolin population. Today, Taiwan has the highest population density of pangolins in the world.

== See also ==
- Mammal classification
- Pholidotamorpha
