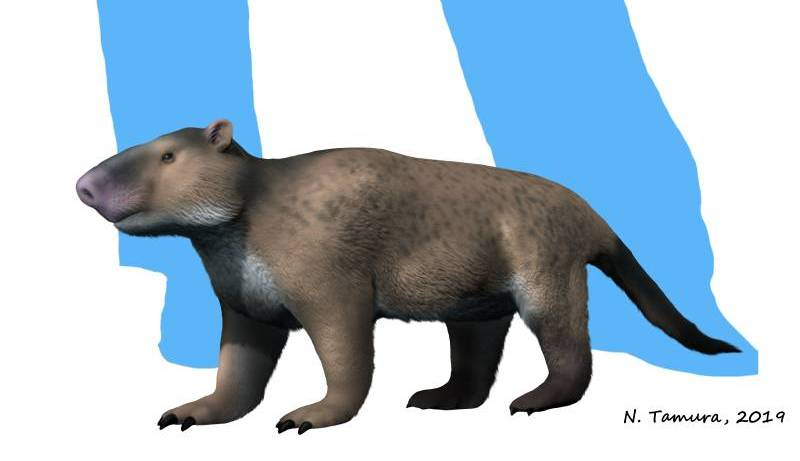
- Reconstruction of Ernanodon antelios

Scientific classification
- Kingdom: Animalia
- Phylum: Chordata
- Class: Mammalia
- Infraclass: Placentalia
- Order: †Palaeanodonta
- Family: †Ernanodontidae; Ding, 1979

Type genus
- †Ernanodon Ding, 1979

Genera
- †Asiabradypus; †Ernanodon

= Ernanodontidae =

Ernanodontidae Temporal range: 62.22–56.0 Ma middle to late Paleocene

Extinct family of mammals

Ernanodontidae ("sprouts of toothless animals") is an extinct family of myrmecophagous placental mammals within extinct order Palaeanodonta, that lived in Asia from the middle to late Paleocene.

== Classification and phylogeny ==
=== Taxonomy ===
- Family: †Ernanodontidae (Ting, 1979)
  - Genus: †Asiabradypus (Nessov, 1987)
    - †Asiabradypus incompositus (Nessov, 1987)
  - Genus: †Ernanodon (Ting, 1979)
    - †Ernanodon antelios (Ting, 1979)

== See also ==
- Mammal classification
- Palaeanodonta
