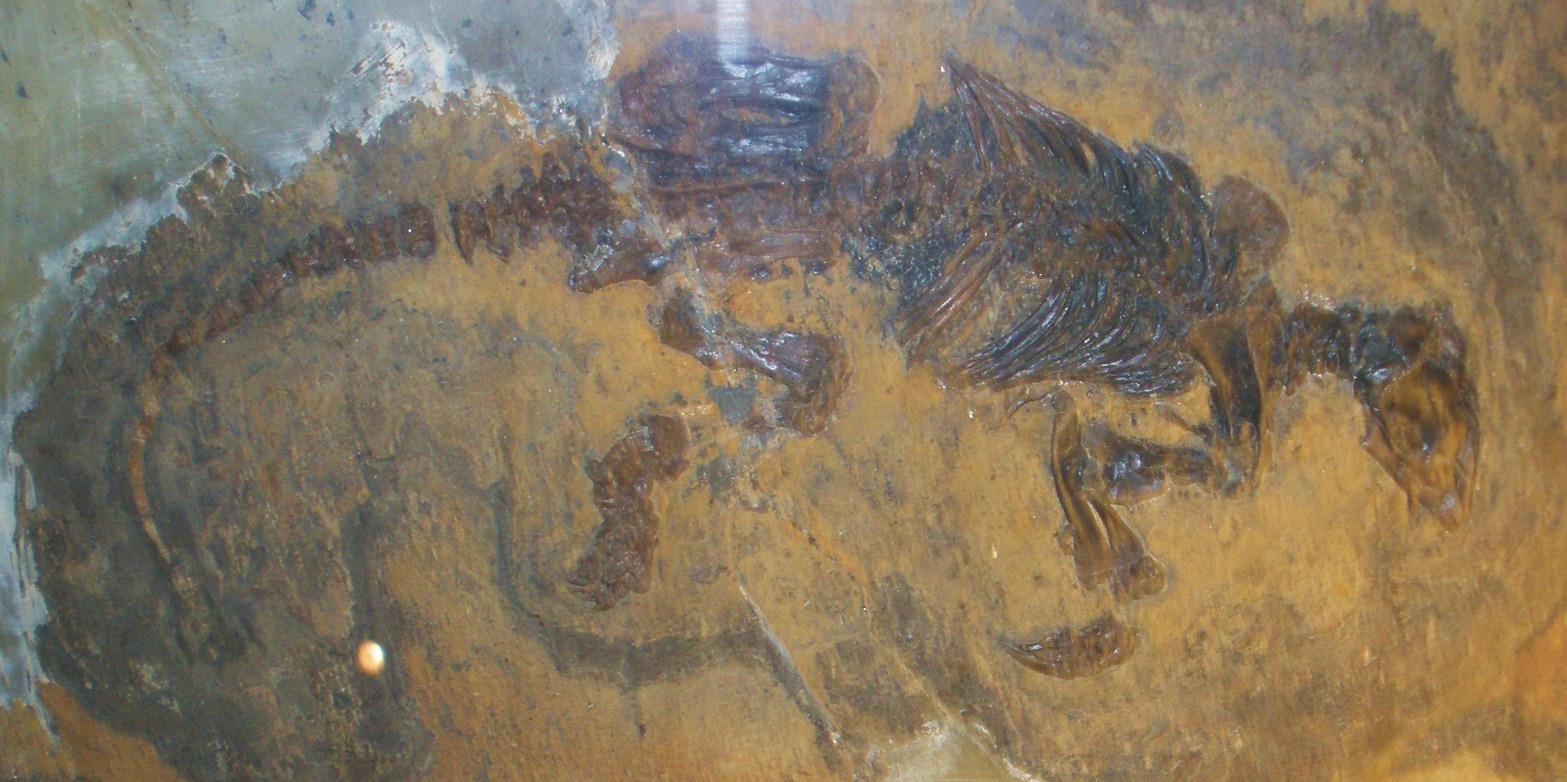
- Fossil of Eomanis waldi
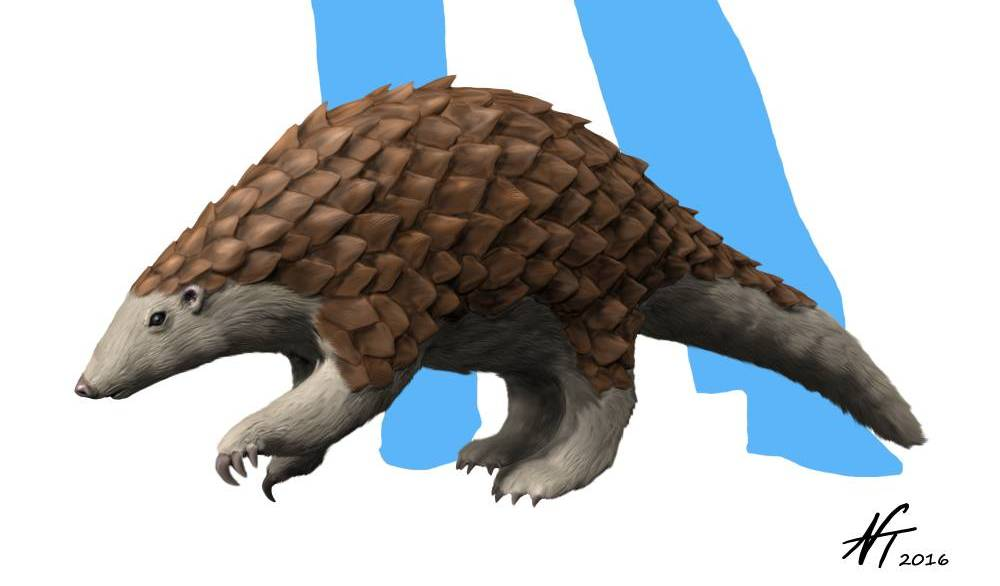
- Life reconstruction of Eomanis waldi

Scientific classification
- Kingdom: Animalia
- Phylum: Chordata
- Class: Mammalia
- Order: Pholidota
- Suborder: Eupholidota
- Superfamily: †Eomanoidea; Gaudin, 2009
- Family: †Eomanidae; Storch, 2003
- Genus: †Eomanis; Storch, 1978

Type species
- †Eomanis waldi Storch, 1978

= Eomanis =

Eomanis Temporal range: 47.8–46.3 Ma Middle Eocene

Extinct genus of mammals

Eomanis ("dawn pangolin") is the earliest known true (and scaled) pangolin from extinct family Eomanidae (and extinct superfamily Eomanoidea) within suborder Eupholidota. It lived during the Eocene in Europe. Eomanis fossils found in the Messel Pit in Germany are very similar in size and anatomy to living pangolins of the genus Manis, indicating that pangolins have remained largely unchanged in morphology and behavior for 50 million years. However, unlike modern pangolins, its tail and legs did not bear scales. According to the stomach contents of the excellently preserved Messel specimens, Eomanis' diet consisted of both insects and plants.

== Phylogeny ==
Phylogenetic position of genus Eomanis within order Pholidota based on Rose (2026.) study:

- - outhgroup
  - Pholidotamorpha (Pholidota [sensu lato])
    - - - †Afredentata
        - †Palaeanodonta
      - †Euromanis
    - Pholidota sensu stricto
      - Eupholidota
        - Manoidea
        - †Eomanoidea
          - †Eomanidae
            - †Eomanis
              †Eomanis waldi

== See also ==
- Mammal classification
