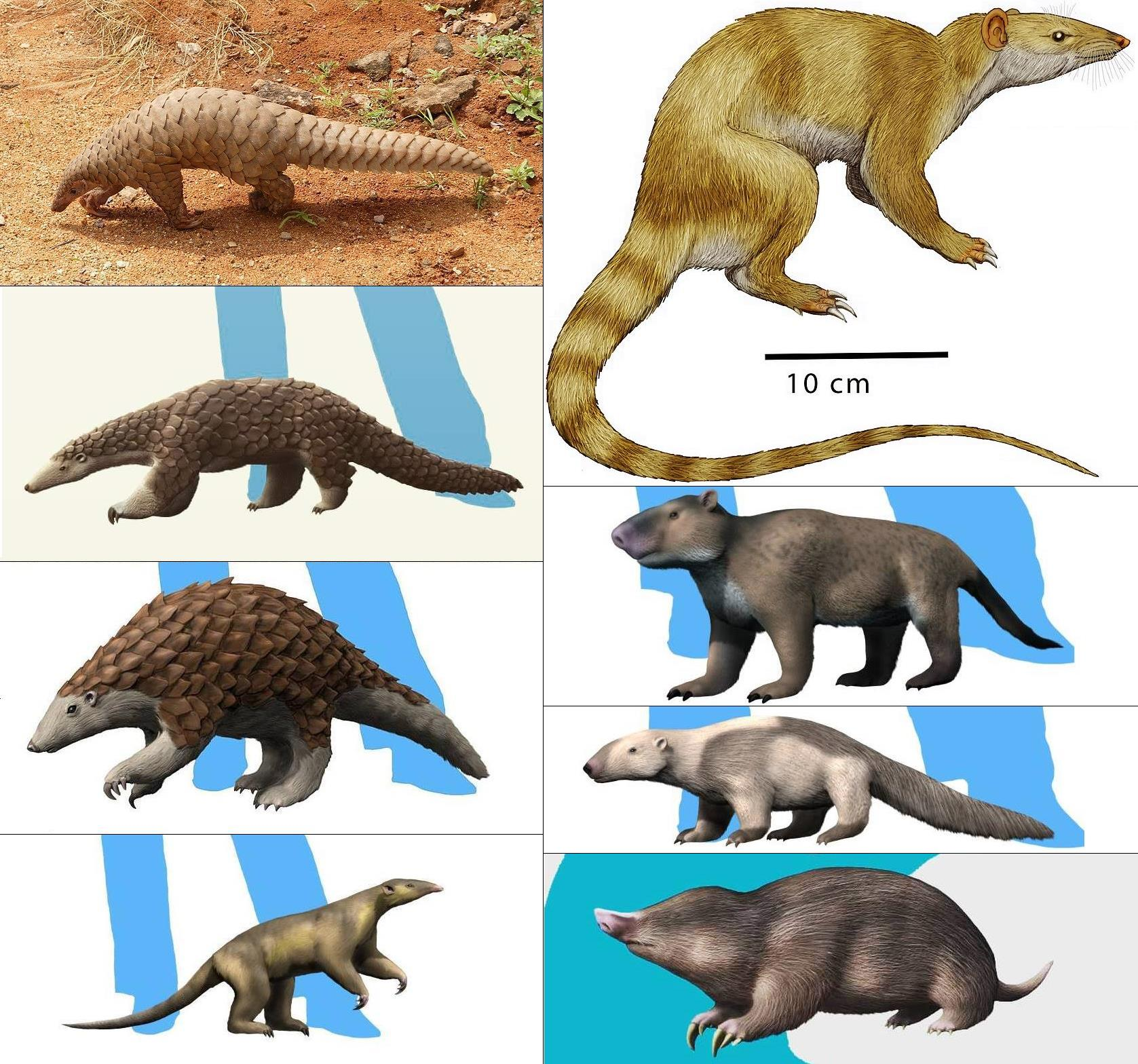
- Various Pholidotamorph genera; clockwise from top left: Manis, Escavadodon, Ernanodon, Xenocranium, Metacheiromys, Eurotamandua, Eomanis and Patriomanis.

Scientific classification
- Kingdom: Animalia
- Phylum: Chordata
- Class: Mammalia
- Infraclass: Placentalia
- Mirorder: Ferae
- Clade: Pholidotamorpha; Gaudin et al., 2009

Subgroups
- Pholidota; †Afredentata; †Palaeanodonta; †Euromanis

Synonyms
- Pholidota (Secord, 2008)

= Pholidotamorpha =

Pholidotamorphs Temporal range: Paleocene–Recent

Clade of mammals

Pholidotamorpha ("pangolin-like forms") is a clade of placental, mostly ant- and termite-eating mammals that (partially) physically resemble anteaters and armadillos. However, those aforementioned species are now placed in the order Xenarthra, along with sloths; Pholidotamorpha is now classified under the mirorder Ferae, which includes the order Carnivora (carnivorous mammals) and the pangolins (Pholidota) as well as the prehistoric order Palaeanodonta, containing only extinct species.

== Classification and phylogeny ==
=== History of taxonomy ===
Both the Pholidota and Palaeanodonta orders were formerly placed with other orders of ant-eating mammals, most notably Xenarthra (armadillos, sloths, anteaters, which they superficially resemble); some palaeontologists, throughout the history of zoology, have placed pangolins and palaeanodonts as a suborder, Pholidota, in the greater order Cimolesta, alongside the extinct family Ernanodontidae (as a separate suborder Ernanodonta) near it. However, this idea fell out of favor when it was determined that cimolestids were not truly placental mammals.

Newer genetic evidence indicates instead that the closest living relatives to Pholidota are the members of order Carnivora, together forming the mirorder Ferae. In 2009, pangolins and palaeanodonts were together placed within the clade Pholidotamorpha. A 2012 study of new remains, found in Late Paleocene Mongolian strata, have led to the assessment that extinct genus Ernanodon is closely related to another extinct genus, Metacheiromys, and is a member of the extinct order Palaeanodonta. A 2026 studies of Eurotamandua remains, found that this extinct genus alongside extinct genis Euromanis are not members of order Pholidota and are more closely related to order Palaeanodonta. Members of extinct order Pantolesta are also recognised to be close relative of clade Pholidotamorpha, based on their dental and postcranial similarities, and semi-fossorial adaptations.

=== Classification ===
Former classification:	Current classification:
Clade: Pholidotamorpha (Gaudin, 2009) (pangolin-like mammals); Order: Pholidota (Weber, 1904) (pangolins); Suborder: Eupholidota (Gaudin, 2009) (true pangolins); Suborder: †Afredentata (Szalay & Schrenk, 1994); Genus: †Euromanis (Gaudin, 2009); Incertae sedis; †Pholidota sp. [BC 16’08] (Pickford, 2008); Order: †Palaeanodonta (Matthew, 1918) (stem-pangolins); Family: †Epoicotheriidae ^{(paraphyletic family)} (Simpson, 1927); Family: †Ernanodontidae (Ding, 1979); Family: †Escavadodontidae (Rose & Lucas, 2000); Family: †Metacheiromyidae ^{(paraphyletic family)} (Wortman, 1903); Incertae sedis: Genus: †Arcticanodon (Rose, 2004); Genus: †Melaniella (Fox, 1984)	Clade: Pholidotamorpha (Gaudin, 2009) (pangolin-like mammals); Order: Pholidota (Weber, 1904) (pangolins); Suborder: Eupholidota (Gaudin, 2009) (true pangolins); Incertae sedis; †Pholidota sp. [BC 16’08] (Pickford, 2008); Order: †Afredentata (Szalay & Schrenk, 1994); Family: †Eurotamanduidae (Szalay & Schrenk, 1994); Order: †Palaeanodonta (Matthew, 1918) (stem-pangolins); Family: †Epoicotheriidae ^{(paraphyletic family)} (Simpson, 1927); Family: †Ernanodontidae (Ding, 1979); Family: †Escavadodontidae (Rose & Lucas, 2000); Family: †Metacheiromyidae ^{(paraphyletic family)} (Wortman, 1903); Incertae sedis: Genus: †Arcticanodon (Rose, 2004); Genus: †Melaniella (Fox, 1984); Genus: †Euromanis (Gaudin, 2009)

=== Phylogeny ===
Cladogram of phylogeny within clade Pholidotamorpha
Based on Kondrashov & Agadjanian (2012.) study:

- - - Eulipotyphla
      Erinaceus
  - - Carnivora
      Nandinia
    - Pholidotamorpha (Pholidota [sensu lato])
      - Pholidota (sensu stricto)
      - †Palaeanodonta

Based on Rose (2026.) study:

- - outhgroup
  - Pholidotamorpha (Pholidota [sensu lato])
    - Pholidota (sensu stricto)
    - - †Euromanis
      - - †Afredentata
        - †Palaeanodonta

== See also ==
- Mammal classification
- Ferae
