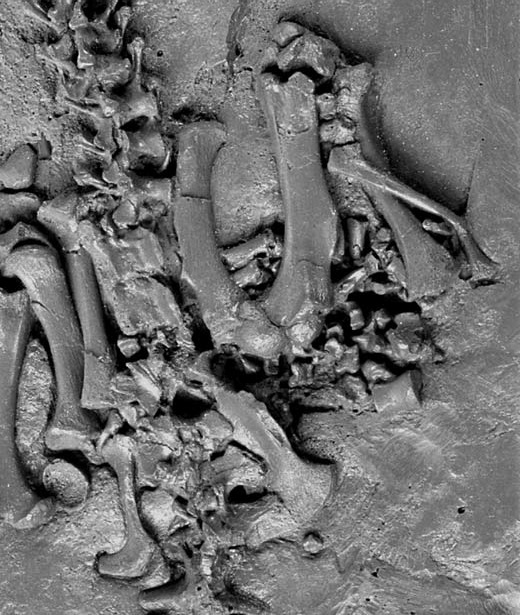
- Fossil of Euromanis krebsi

Scientific classification
- Kingdom: Animalia
- Phylum: Chordata
- Class: Mammalia
- Clade: Pholidotamorpha
- Genus: †Euromanis; Gaudin, 2009

Type species
- †Euromanis krebsi (Storch & Martin, 1994)

Synonyms
- synonyms of species: Е. krebsi; Eomanis krebsi Storch & Martin, 1994

= Euromanis =

Euromanis Temporal range: 47.8–46.3 Ma Middle Eocene

Genus of mammals

Euromanis ("european pangolin") is an extinct genus of placental mammals from clade Pholidotamorpha. It lived during the middle Eocene in Europe. Euromanis fossils found in the Messel Pit in Germany.

== Classification and phylogeny ==
=== History of taxonomy ===
Euromanis krebsi was originally described as a species of pangolins from genus Eomanis. In later studies, it was assigned to its own genus as an basal representative of order Pholidota. However, a 2026 studies found that this extinct genus of mammals is not member of order Pholidota, and is more closely related to order Palaeanodonta alongside genus Eurotamandua.

=== Phylogeny ===
Phylogenetic position of genus Euromanis based on Rose (2026.) study:

- - outhgroup
  - Pholidotamorpha (Pholidota [sensu lato])
    - Pholidota (sensu stricto)
    - - - †Afredentata
        - †Palaeanodonta
      - - †Euromanis
          †Euromanis krebsi

== See also ==
- Mammal classification
- Pholidotamorpha
