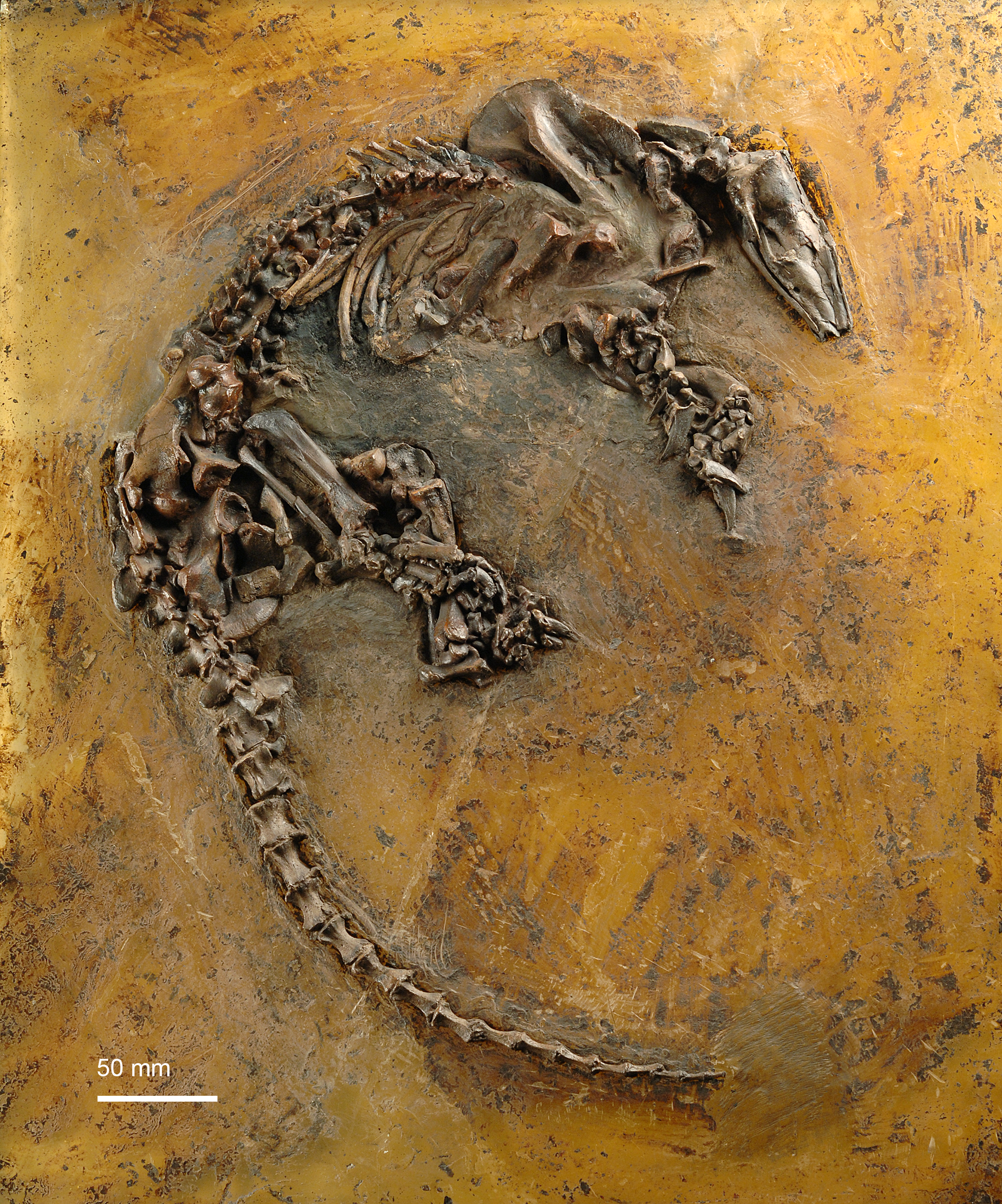
- Fossil of Eurotamandua joresi
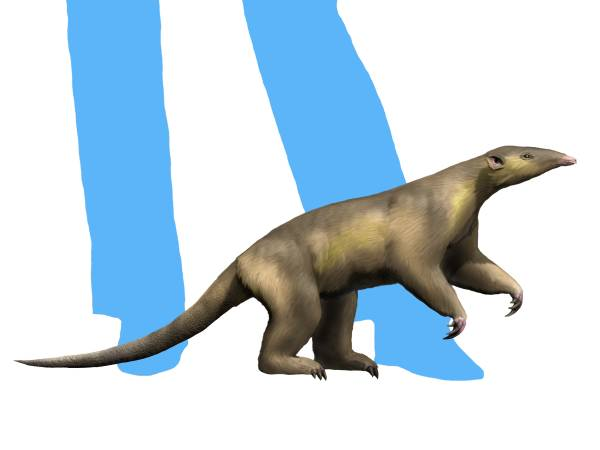
- Life reconstruction of Eurotamandua joresi

Scientific classification
- Kingdom: Animalia
- Phylum: Chordata
- Class: Mammalia
- Clade: Pholidotamorpha
- Order: †Afredentata; Szalay & Schrenk, 1994
- Family: †Eurotamanduidae; Szalay & Schrenk, 1994
- Genus: †Eurotamandua; Storch, 1981

Type species
- †Eurotamandua joresi Storch, 1981

= Eurotamandua =

Eurotamandua Temporal range: 47.8–46.3 Ma Middle Eocene

Extinct genus of pangolins

Eurotamandua ("European Tamandua") or European anteater, is an extinct genus of placental mammals from extinct family Eurotamanduidae and extinct order Afredentata from clade Pholidotamorpha. It lived during the middle Eocene in Europe. Eurotamandua fossils found in the Messel Pit in southwestern Germany.

== Characteristics and paleobiology ==
A single fossil is known, coming from the Messel Pit in Germany. Eurotamandua was about 90 cm (35 in) long. Eurotamandua bears characteristics found in almost all ant-eating mammals: long claws, an elongated snout, and most likely the same long, sticky tongue. These features led Eurotamandua to be initially misclassified as a xenarthran anteater, which was common for many ant-eating mammals prior to the 20th century. Presumably it also fed on ants and termites. The generic name comments on the strong, albeit possibly superficial resemblance to modern arboreal anteaters of the genus Tamandua, especially with its long, prehensile tail.

== Classification and phylogeny ==
=== History of taxonomy ===
When its fossils were first discovered, Eurotamandua was originally thought to be an anteater related to genus Tamandua, and later as primitive member of Xenarthra. However, this classification was highly unlikely because all known fossil evidence indicates that xenarthrans existed exclusively in South America from the beginning of the Cenozoic era until the formation of the Panama land bridge (3 million years ago), after which they spread to North America, but never to Eurasia or Africa. Another possibility that arose at the time was that Eurotamandua belongs to Afrotheria.

Later studies set Eurotamandua's placement within the pangolins was made primarily because of a lack of the characteristic "xenarthran" joints found in all xenarthrans, including tamanduas. It was thought to be a primitive member of order Pholidota as it lacked the characteristic fused-hair scales of other pangolins. It was closer to suborder Eupholidota more than genus Euromanis.

However, a 2026 studies found that this extinct genus of mammals is not member of order Pholidota, and is more closely related to order Palaeanodonta along side genus Euromanis.

=== Phylogeny ===
Phylogenetic position of genus Eurotamandua based on Rose (2026.) study:

- - outhgroup
  - Pholidotamorpha (Pholidota [sensu lato])
    - Pholidota (sensu stricto)
    - - †Euromanis
      - - †Palaeanodonta
        - †Afredentata
          - †Eurotamanduidae
            - †Eurotamandua
              †Eurotamandua joresi

== See also ==
- Mammal classification
- Pholidotamorpha
