= Palaeanodonta =

Palaeanodonta Temporal range: 62.4–30.9 Ma Middle Paleocene – Early Oligocene
- From top to bottom: Escavadodon zygus, Ernanodon antelios, Metacheiromys marshi and Xenocranium pileorivale

Scientific classification
- Kingdom: Animalia
- Phylum: Chordata
- Class: Mammalia
- Mirorder: Ferae
- Clade: Pholidotamorpha
- Order: †Palaeanodonta; Matthew, 1918

Families and genera
- [see classification]

Synonyms
- list of synonyms: Ernodonta (Ding, 1987); Ernanodonta (Ding, 1987); Palaeanodontidae (Carroll, 1988); Palaeanodontiformes (Kinman, 1994); Palaenodonta (Rose, 2008); Palaenodontina (Pearse, 1936)

Extinct clade of mammals

Palaeanodonta ("ancient toothless animals") is an extinct order of placental mammals in the clade Pholidotamorpha. They were insectivorous (myrmecophagous), fossorial or semifossorial, and lived from the middle Paleocene to early Oligocene in North America, Europe and Asia. While the taxonomic grouping of Palaeanodonta has been debated, it is widely thought that they are a sister group to pangolins.

== Anatomy ==
=== Skull ===
Palaeanodonts generally have low and caudally-broad skulls, with notable lambdoid crests and inflated bullae and squamosals.

=== Teeth ===
Despite the name of the group and contrary to their pangolin relatives, palaeanodonts are known to have had teeth. Early palaeanodonts retained minimal tribosphenic post-canines while later species had peglike or otherwise reduced molar crowns. Many also had large, characteristic cuspids.

== Classification and phylogeny ==
Former classification:	Current classification:
Order: †Palaeanodonta (Matthew, 1918) (stem-pangolins); Family: †Epoicotheriidae ^{(paraphyletic family)} (Simpson, 1927); Family: †Escavadodontidae (Rose & Lucas, 2000); Family: †Metacheiromyidae (Wortman, 1903); Incertae sedis: Genus: †Arcticanodon (Rose, 2004); Genus: †Melaniella (Fox, 1984)	Order: †Palaeanodonta (Matthew, 1918) (stem-pangolins); Family: †Epoicotheriidae ^{(paraphyletic family)} (Simpson, 1927); Genus: †Alocodontulum (Rose, 1978); †Alocodontulum atopum (Rose, 1977); Genus: †Amelotabes (Rose, 1978); †Amelotabes simpsoni (Rose, 1978); Genus: †Auroratherium (Tong & Wang, 1997); †Auroratherium sinense (Tong & Wang, 1997); Genus: †Dipassalus (Rose, 1991); †Dipassalus oryctes (Rose, 1991); Genus: †Myrmecoboides (Gidley, 1915); †Myrmecoboides arenarius (Secord, 2008); †Myrmecoboides montanensis (Gidley, 1915); Genus: †Tubulodon (Jepsen, 1932); †Tubulodon taylori (Jepsen, 1932); Subfamily: †Epoicotheriinae ^{(paraphyletic subfamily)} (Simpson, 1927); Genus: †Pentapassalus (Gazin, 1952); †Pentapassalus pearcei (Gazin, 1952); †Pentapassalus woodi (Guthrie, 1967); Genus: †Tetrapassalus (Simpson, 1959); †Tetrapassalus mckennai (Simpson, 1959); †Tetrapassalus proius (West, 1973); †Tetrapassalus sp. A [AMNH 10215] (Rose, 1978); †Tetrapassalus sp. B (Robinson, 1963); (unranked): †Epoicotherium/Xenocranium clade; Genus: †Epoicotherium (Simpson, 1927); †Epoicotherium unicum (Douglass, 1905); Genus: †Molaetherium (Storch & Rummel, 1999); †Molaetherium heissigi (Storch & Rummel, 1999); Genus: †Xenocranium (Colbert, 1942); †Xenocranium pileorivale (Colbert, 1942); Family: †Ernanodontidae (Ting, 1979); Genus: †Asiabradypus (Nessov, 1987); †Asiabradypus incompositus (Nessov, 1987); Genus: †Ernanodon (Ting, 1979); †Ernanodon antelios (Ting, 1979); Family: †Escavadodontidae (Rose & Lucas, 2000); Genus: †Escavadodon (Rose & Lucas, 2000); †Escavadodon zygus (Rose & Lucas, 2000); Family: †Metacheiromyidae ^{(paraphyletic family)} (Wortman, 1903); Genus: †Brachianodon (Gunnell & Gingerich, 1993); †Brachianodon westorum (Gunnell & Gingerich, 1993); Genus: †Mylanodon (Secord, 2002); †Mylanodon rosei (Secord, 2002); Subfamily: †Metacheiromyinae ^{(paraphyletic subfamily)} (Wortman, 1903); Genus: †Metacheiromys (Wortman, 1903); †Metacheiromys dasypus (Osborn, 1904); †Metacheiromys marshi (Wortman, 1903); Genus: †Palaeanodon (Matthew, 1918); †Palaeanodon ignavus (Matthew, 1918); †Palaeanodon nievelti (Gingerich, 1989); †Palaeanodon parvulus (Matthew, 1918); †Palaeanodon sp. [Le Quesnoy] (Gheerbrant, 2005); Subfamily: †Propalaeanodontinae (Schoch, 1984); Genus: †Propalaeanodon (Rose, 1979); †Palaeanodon parvulus (Rose, 1979); Incertae sedis: Genus: †Arcticanodon (Rose, 2004); †Arcticanodon dawsonae (Rose, 2004); Genus: †Melaniella (Fox, 1984); †Melaniella timosa (Fox, 1984)

=== Phylogeny ===
Cladogram of phylogeny within order Palaeanodonta
Based on Rose (2000.) study:

- - - Scandentia
      - Tupaiidae
        Tupaia
  - - - †Leptictida
        †Leptictidae
    - - Erinaceomorpha
      - - †Pantolesta
          †Pantolestidae
        - Pholidota sensu lato
          - †Palaeanodonta
            - †Escavadodontidae
              †Escavadodon
            - other Palaeanodonta

Based on Rose (2005.) study:

- - †Ernanodonta
    †Ernanodontidae
  - †Pantolesta
    †Pantolestidae
  - Pholidota sensu lato
    - †Escavadodontidae
    - - †Epoicotheriidae
      - - †Metacheiromyidae
        - ?
          †Afredentata
        - Pholidota

Based on Rose (2008.) study:

- - †Pantolesta
    †Pantolestidae
  - †Palaeanodonta
    - - †Escavadodontidae
        †Escavadodon
    - - †Amelotabes
      - - - - - - †Epoicotherium
                - †Xenocranium
              - †Tetrapassalus
            - †Dipassalus
          - †Alocodontulum
          - †Pentapassalus
          - †Tubulodon
        - ?
          †Arcticanodon
        - - †Metacheiromyidae
            - †Propalaeanodon
            - - †Mylanodon
              - - †Brachianodon
                - - †Metacheiromys
                  - †Palaeanodon

Based on Kondrashov & Agadjanian (2012.) study:

- - - Eulipotyphla
      Erinaceus
  - - Carnivora
      Nandinia
    - Pholidotamorpha (Pholidota [sensu lato])
      - Pholidota (sensu stricto)
      - †Palaeanodonta
        - †Palaeanodon
        - - †Metacheiromys
          - †Ernanodontidae
            †Ernanodon

Based on Hooker (2013.) study:

- - outhgroup
  - - †Pantolesta
    - †Palaeanodonta
      - †Escavadodon
      - - †Myrmecoboides
        - - †Alocodontulum
          - †Amelotabes

Based on Rose (2026.) study:

- - outhgroup
  - Pholidotamorpha (Pholidota [sensu lato])
    - Pholidota (sensu stricto)
    - - †Euromanis
      - - †Afredentata
        - †Palaeanodonta
          - †Metacheiromyidae
            - †Metacheiromys
            - †Palaeanodon

== See also ==
- Mammal classification
- Pholidotamorpha
