= Pangolin (disambiguation) =

Pangolin, sometimes known as a scaly anteater, is a mammal of the order Pholidota -one extant family, Manidae; more specifically:

- Manidae (pangolins)

- Maninae (subfamily: Asiatic pangolins)

- Manis (Asiatic pangolins)

- Manis crassicaudata (Indian pangolin)
- Manis pentadactyla (Chinese pangolin)
- Paramanis

- Manis javanica (Sunda pangolin)
- Manis culionensis (Philippine pangolin)
- †Manis palaeojavanica

- Phatagininae (small African pangolins)

- Phataginus (African tree pangolins)

- Phataginus tetradactyla (Long-tailed pangolin)
- Phataginus tricuspis (Tree pangolin)

- Subfamily: Smutsiinae (large African pangolins)

- Smutsia (African ground pangolins)

- Smutsia gigantea (Giant pangolin)
- Smutsia temmincki (Ground pangolin)

== Science, and technology, and mathematics ==
- Pangolin Editions, a metal foundry in England, specialising in casting sculptures

=== Software ===
- Precise Pangolin, a release of the Ubuntu operating system: Ubuntu 12.04 LTS
- Phylogenetic Assignment of Named Global Outbreak Lineages (PANGOLIN)
