= Pangolin trade =

Illegal poaching, sale and trafficking of pangolins

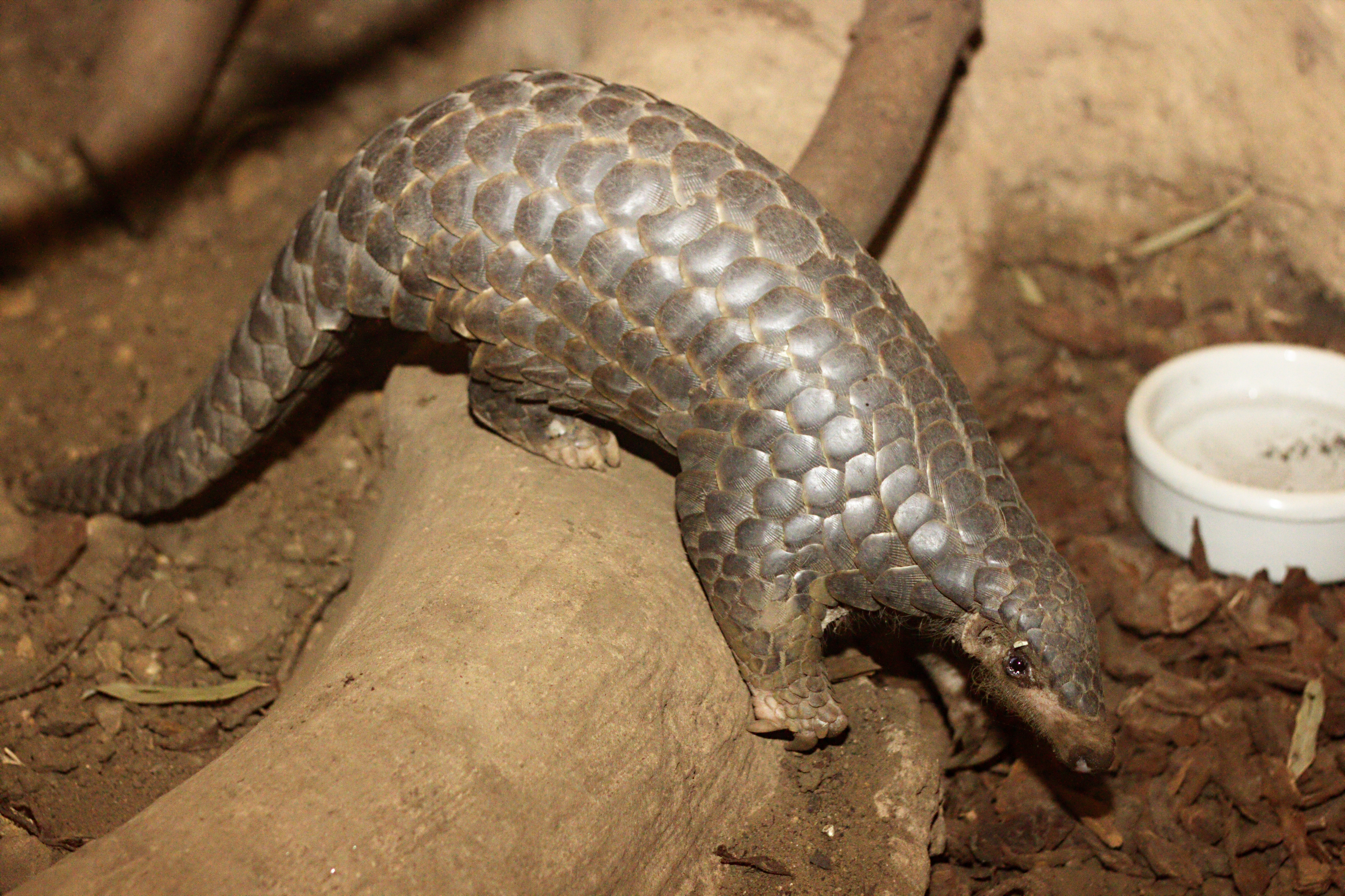
A Chinese pangolin (Manis pentadactyla) at Zoo Leipzig in Leipzig, Germany

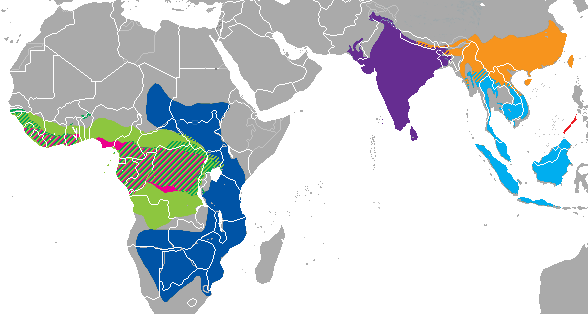
Pangolin species distributions: Indian pangolin (Manis crassicaudata) Chinese pangolin (Manis pentadactyla) Sunda pangolin (Manis javanica) Philippine pangolin (Manis culionensis) Tree pangolin (Phataginus tricuspis) Long-tailed pangolin (Phataginus tetradactyla) Giant pangolin (Smutsia gigantea) Cape pangolin (Smutsia temminckii)

The pangolin trade is the illegal poaching, trafficking, and sale of pangolins, parts of pangolins, or pangolin-derived products on the black market. Pangolins are believed to be the world's most trafficked mammal, accounting for as much as 20% of all illegal wildlife trade. According to the International Union for Conservation of Nature (IUCN), more than a million pangolins were poached in the decade prior to 2014.

The animals are trafficked mainly for their scales, which are believed to treat a variety of health conditions in traditional Chinese medicine (TCM), and as a luxury food in Vietnam and China. In Africa, pangolins are sold as a form of bushmeat, for ritual or spiritual purposes, and use in traditional African medicine. Many times the animal is trafficked just for clothing and fashion.

The Convention on International Trade in Endangered Species (CITES), which regulates the international wildlife trade, has placed restrictions on the pangolin market since 1975, and in 2016, it added all eight pangolin species to its Appendix I, reserved for the strictest prohibitions on animals threatened with extinction. They are also listed on the IUCN Red List, all with decreasing populations and designations ranging from Vulnerable to Critically Endangered.

== Background ==
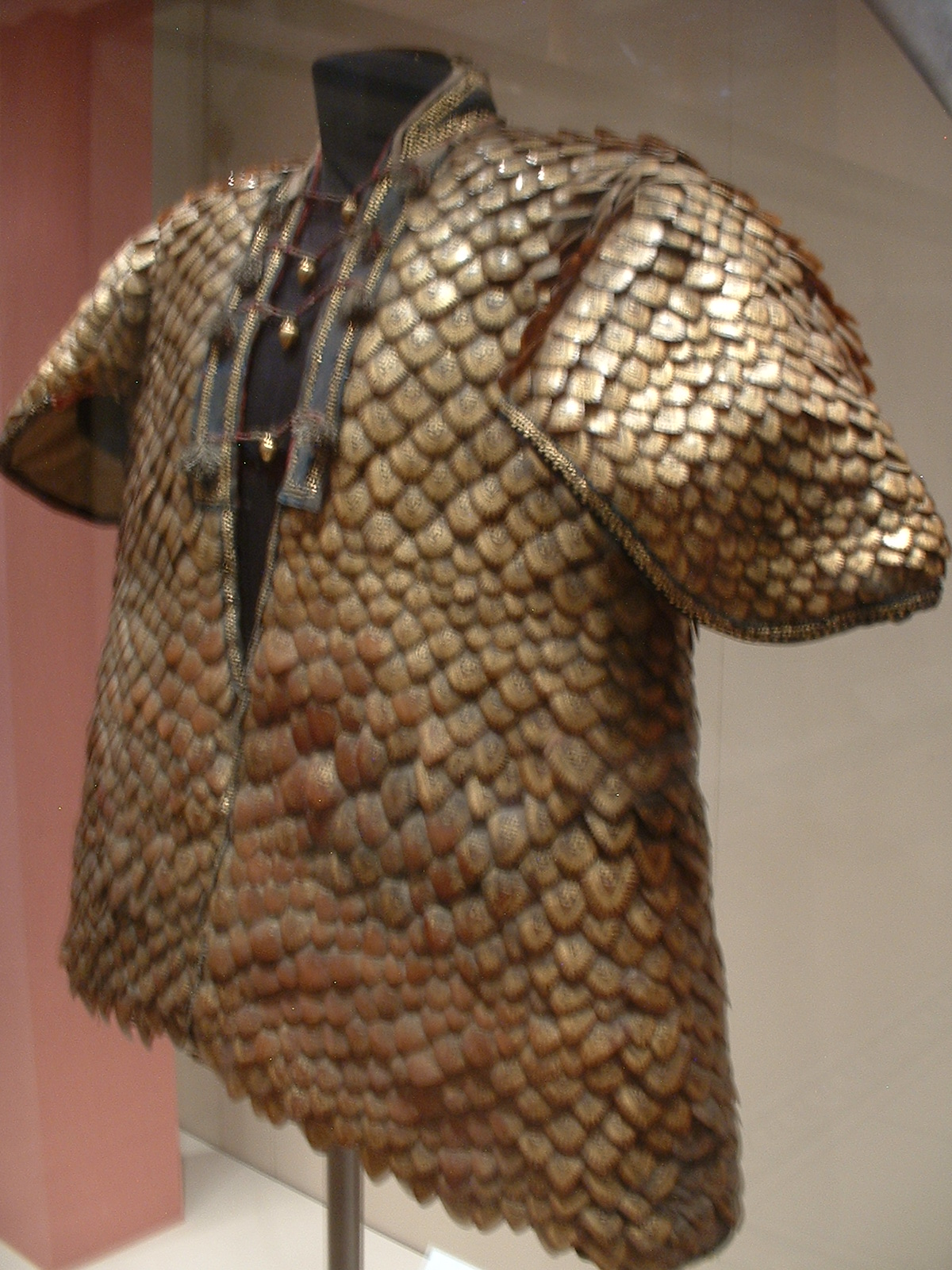
A coat made with Manis crassicaudata scales on display at the Royal Armouries in Leeds. The coat was given to King George III in 1820, along with a helmet, also made with pangolin scales.

Pangolins are mammals of the order Pholidota, of which there is one extant family, Manidae, with three genera: Manis includes four species in Asia, and Phataginus and Smutsia each comprise two species in Africa. They are the only mammal known to have a layer of large, protective keratin scales covering their skin. Though sometimes known by the common name "scaly anteater," and formerly considered to be in the same order as anteaters, they are taxonomically distant, grouped with Carnivora under the clade Ferae.

Pangolin behavior varies by species, with some living on the ground, in burrows, and some living in trees. A common predator, big cats, struggle to contend with pangolins' scales when rolled up. But while well-equipped to defend against natural predators, they are easily caught by poachers, who simply pick up the animals when they roll into a ball.

All eight species of pangolin are listed on the IUCN Red List, with designations ranging from Vulnerable to Critically Endangered. According to the IUCN and other scientists and activists, the populations of all species are rapidly decreasing.

== History ==
The pangolin trade is centuries old. An early known example is in 1820, when Francis Rawdon, first Marquis of Hastinges and East India Company Governor General in Bengal, presented King George III with a coat made with the scales of Manis crassicaudata. The gifts are owned by The Royal Collections Trust but are on loan to and displayed in the Royal Armouries in Leeds. Additionally, the 'Splendours of the Subcontinent' exhibit in the Royal Collections Trust is home to a coat and a helmet made from pangolin and armadillo scales. The coat and helmet were presented to King Edward VII, when Prince of Wales, during his tour of India in 1875-76 by Bhavani Singh, Maharaja of Datia.

The Convention on International Trade in Endangered Species (CITES), which regulates the international wildlife trade, added the eight known species of pangolin to its appendices in 1975. CITES places species it seeks to protect in three appendices organized according to urgency and, correspondingly, the strictness of the regulations. Appendix I includes the strictest prohibitions and is reserved for animals threatened with extinction. In 1975, Smutsia temminckii was placed in Appendix I; Manis crassicaudata, Manis culionensis, Manis javanica, and Manis pentadactyla were placed in Appendix II; Smutsia gigantea, Phataginus tetradactyla, and Phataginus tricuspis were placed in Appendix III. In 1995, Smutsia and Phataginus were moved to Appendix II. Finally, in 2016, at the 17th CITES Conference of Parties in Johannesburg, representatives of 182 countries unanimously enacted a ban on the international trade of all pangolin species by moving them to Appendix I. Though the individual species are listed in Appendix I, the family as a whole (Manidae) is under Appendix II, with the implication that if additional species are discovered, they will be automatically placed in Appendix II.

Despite restrictions on trade in place since 1975, enforcement is not uniformly strong. Most efforts have focused on curbing the supply side of the trade, but demand remains high and there is a thriving black market. Pangolins are believed to be the world's most trafficked mammal, accounting for as much as 20% of all illegal wildlife trade. In 2014, the Worldwatch Institute reported that more pangolins were seized than any other animal in Asia's wildlife black market. Estimates place the number of pangolins poached each year at between 10,000 and 100,000. The International Union for Conservation of Nature (IUCN) estimates that more than a million pangolins were poached in the decade prior to 2014. Most are sent to China and Vietnam, where their meat is prized and scales used for medicinal purposes.

African and Asian nations frequently report on noteworthy confiscations of pangolins and pangolin parts. When a Chinese boat ran into a coral reef in the Philippines in 2013, officials discovered it to be carrying 10 tonnes of frozen pangolins.

During the 2019-20 coronavirus pandemic, nucleic acid sequences of viruses taken from pangolins had initially been found to be a 99% match with SARS-CoV-2, the virus which causes COVID-19. The virus was believed to have originated in bats, and that pangolins were an intermediate host prior to infecting humans. The illicit Chinese trade of pangolins was suggested as a vector for human transmission. However, pangolins were eventually ruled out as the definitive source of (SARS-CoV-2), after it emerged that the 99% match did not actually refer to the entire genome, but to a specific site known as the receptor-binding domain (RBD). A whole-genome comparison found that the pangolin and human viruses share only up to 92% of their nucleic acid sequence, while at least 99.8% is needed for a conclusive match. Ecologists worried that the early speculation about pangolins being the source may have led to mass slaughters, endangering the animals further.

== Asia ==
The black market pangolin trade is primarily active in Asia, particularly in China where the population can be considered as vermin. Demand is particularly high for their scales, but whole animals are also sold either living or dead for the production of other products with purported medicinal properties or for consumption as exotic food.

=== Scales ===
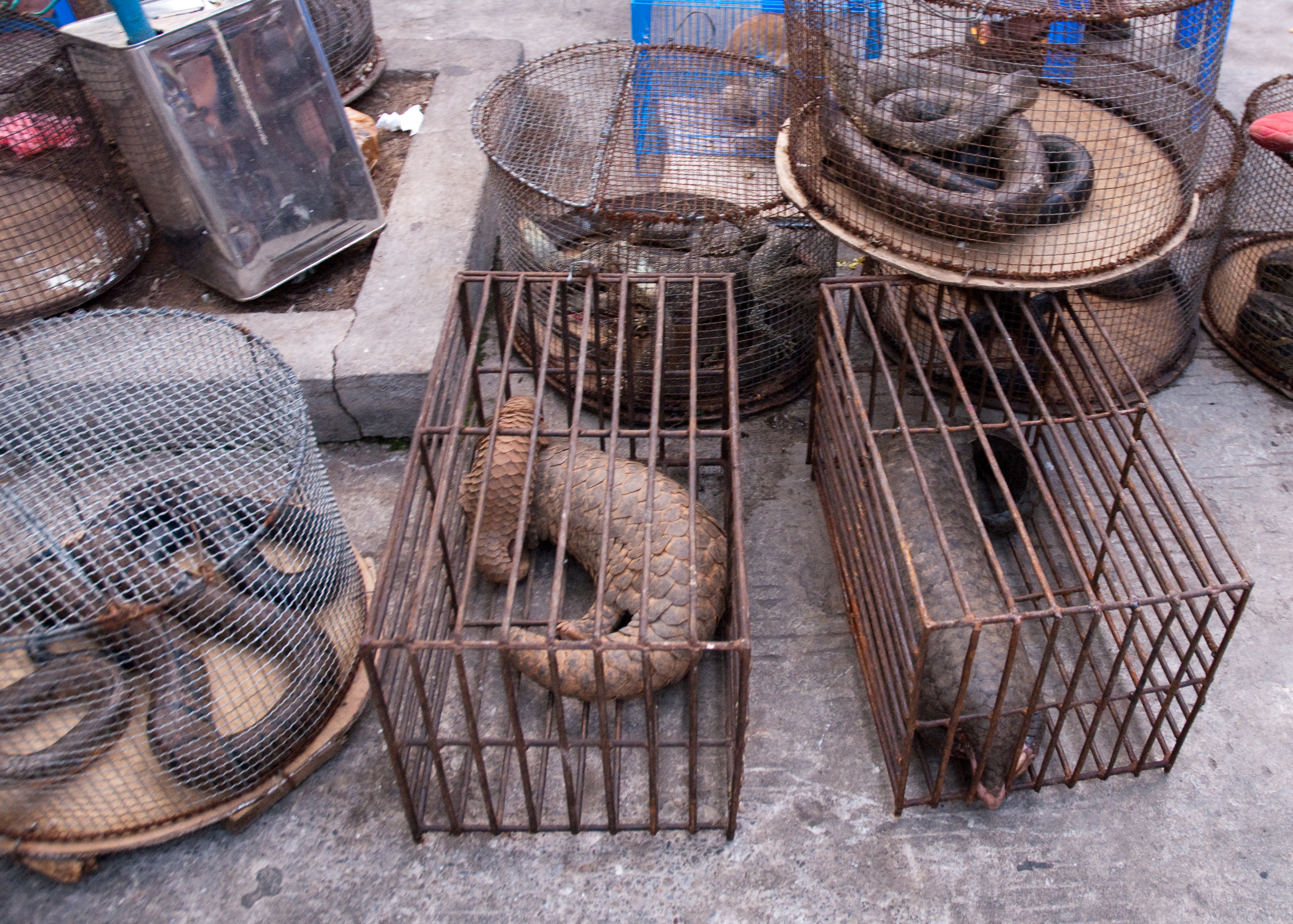
Illicit wildlife trade in Myanmar

Pangolins have a thick layer of protective scales made from keratin, the same material that makes up human fingernails. Scales account for about 20 percent of the animal's weight. When threatened, pangolins curl into a ball, using the scales as armor to defend against predators.

The scales can cost more than $3,000/kg on the black market. In traditional Chinese medicine (TCM), the scales are used for a variety of purposes. The pangolins are boiled to remove the scales, which are dried and roasted, then sold based on claims that they can stimulate lactation, help to drain pus, and relieve skin diseases or palsy. As of 2015, pangolin scales were covered under some health insurance plans in Vietnam.

=== Meat ===
Pangolin meat is prized as a delicacy in parts of China and Vietnam. In China, the meat is believed to have nutritional value to aid kidney function. In Vietnam, restaurants charge as much as $150 per pound of pangolin meat. At one restaurant in Ho Chi Minh City, pangolin is the most expensive item on its menu of exotic wildlife, requiring a deposit and a few hours' notice. Restaurant employees often kill the animal at the table, in front of diners, to show authenticity and freshness.

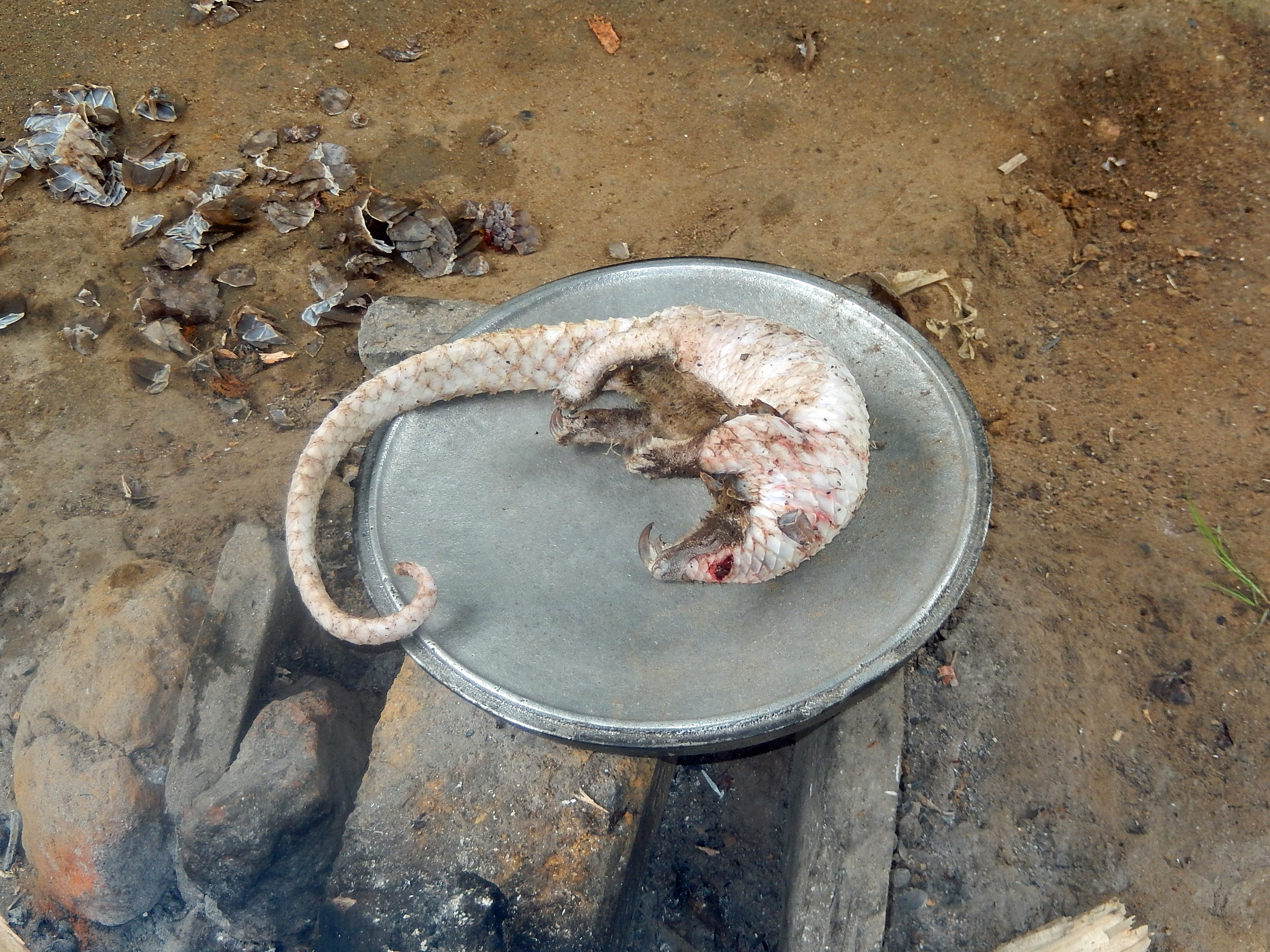
Pangolin prepared for cooking

According to Dan Challender of the International Union for Conservation of Nature's pangolin specialist group, "The fact that it's illegal isn't played down and is even attractive, because it adds this element that you live beyond the law."

=== Use in traditional medicine ===
The official pharmacopoeia of the People's Republic of China continues to include Chinese pangolin scales as an ingredient in TCM formulations, and there is a legal market for scales. Pangolin scales are alleged to unblock blood clots, promote blood circulation, to aid in lactation, and to aid in fertility. The number of purported uses continue to expand, such as patents being filed to cure anorexia in children and to relieve adhesive intestinal obstruction. However, pangolin scales are made predominantly of keratin, a protein family that makes up the majority of human skin, hair, and nails, as well as many other structures throughout the animal kingdom. Human digestive tracts are unable to digest keratin, as they lack the required keratinases needed to break down the strong disulfide bonds found within. Thus, humans cannot absorb ingested keratin, and it passes through the digestive tract mostly unchanged. As such, evidence-based medicine has shown that pangolin scales are not the cures thay are marketed to be, and that any reported benefits are not significantly different than placebo.

=== Other products ===
Though meat and scales are the primary drivers of the intercontinental pangolin trade, there are also other less common parts and uses. Pangolin wine is produced by boiling rice wine with a baby pangolin. It is purported to have various healing properties, such as for treatment of skin disease and improved breathing. Pangolin blood is similarly viewed by some as having medicinal value. Pangolin skins have also been trafficked. In 2015, Uganda reported it had seized two tons of pangolin skins. There is also evidence of live pangolins traded internationally as zoo animals.

== Africa ==
Humans hunt, trade, and traffic pangolins in Africa for spiritual purposes, traditional medicine, and consumption as bushmeat. In some areas, poaching of pangolins is protected by either laws or cultural or spiritual taboos. For example, chiefs within the Hurungwe District of Zimbabwe prohibit the killing or trade of Pangolins.

=== Bushmeat ===
Pangolins are poached by subsistence hunters for direct consumption, sold in local markets, as well as purchased directly from home-working vendors or hunters. A 1988 report found that in Nigeria, the long-tailed (Phataginus tetradactyla) and white-bellied (Phataginus tricuspis) species were the second-most expensive bushmeat. However, in some areas, such as the Democratic Republic of the Congo, pangolins are one of the least frequently captured animals for bushmeat (totaling 1.7% of the species recorded in 1987). This was in-part due to their elusive nature as well as social taboos. In Ghana, pangolins are hunted using traps, guns, or dogs, and often traded directly from hunters to roadside restaurants or wholesalers, bypassing markets. There is an indication of elevated hunting during lean farming periods. This, in-part, seems to be due to low labor demands for cocoa farms (a primary agricultural resource in Ghana) in September and October and consequentially higher labor demands in November and December.

=== Traditional medicine ===
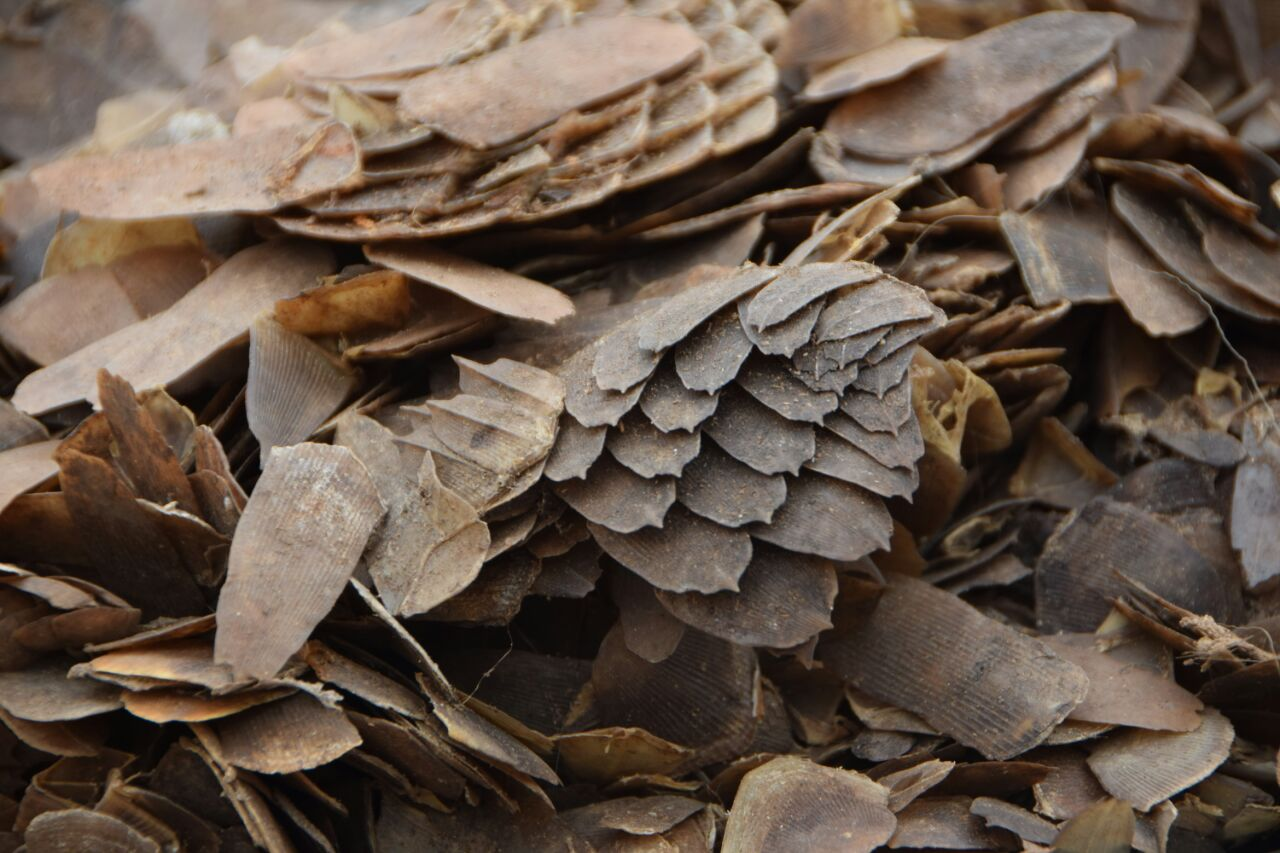
Confiscated pangolin scales set to be destroyed in Cameroon in 2017

Pangolins play a number of roles in traditional African medicine, and a larger number of the animals' parts have a purpose. For example, a study of pangolin use in Kumasi, Ghana, found examples for 13 body parts.

The scales are used by Yorubic medical practitioners in Nigeria to treat, cure, or regulate stomach disorders, gonorrhea, menstrual periods, genital itching or swelling, wounds and cuts, mental illness, stroke, and serve as an antidote for various poisons. The Awori Tribe uses them to treat back pain, mental illness, rheumatism, stomach ulcers, venereal diseases, wounds and cuts, low sexual libido, and as antibiotics. In Ghana, a study in Kumasi found scales used to treat a number of different medical ailments like rheumatism, infertility, convulsions, epilepsy, menstrual pains, stomach disorders, headaches, waist and back pain, stroke, mental illness, skin scars, waterborne illnesses, and leprosy. Research in Lentsweletau, Botswana found scales used for cracked heels, persistent cough, and nose bleeds in humans, and, when burned, the smoke was used to improve the health of cattle. In the Bombali district of Sierra Leone, scales were used for skin disease, impotence, infertility, broken ribs, stomach diseases, inflammation of the naval, athletes foot, nail disorders, healing premature babies, arthritis, rheumatism, epilepsy, body pain, ear infections, rashes, and scars.

In Yorubic medicine, pangolin bones are used to treat stroke, back pain, and rheumatism, while the Awori also use them to treat mental illness. In Ghana, they have been used for rheumatism, convulsions, headaches, stroke, waist pain, asthma, mental illness, fever, bed-wetting, broken legs, rashes, and breast cancer.

The head of a pangolin is used by the Awori to treat convulsions and remove dizziness. In Ghana, it was found to be used for infertility, stroke, headaches, heart disease, fever, gonorrhea, and body aches. In Sierra Leone, evidence was found of use for infertility, headaches, skin diseases, toothaches, heart disease, paralysis, hernias, claw hand, and as an antidote for poison.

Pangolin oil, collected while smoking an animal over a fire, was used in Sierra Leone for rashes, stretch marks, cracked heels, skin diseases, knee pain, heart disease, and elephantiasis.

In some areas, eating pangolin meat is believed to have medicinal value. For example, in Sierra Leone, it is used to heal premature babies, stomach disorders, rheumatism, epilepsy, high blood pressure, body pain, common childhood diseases, convulsions, and anemia.

=== Non-medicinal beliefs ===
In Africa, pangolins are used for a variety of non-medicinal purposes, such as improving finances, improving luck, or protecting against spiritual forces.

Some groups in Nigeria believe the flesh of the pangolin can give the consumer the power of divination, or otherwise bring good luck, safety, or calmness. People looking for business success might use the head and the tip of the tail. The limbs are believed to bring good fortune and money. The scales of a pangolin may be used to give good luck, increase the productivity of a farm, ward off witches and evil forces, have a safe delivery of a child, provide protection, to arrest thieves, and to create amulets. The whole body of a pangolin is used in building rituals, for good fortune, prosperity, warding off sickness, curing infertility in women, granting invisibility, achieving good sales in business, prevent spells or curses, hypnosis, or seduction.

In Ghana, the community in the Kusami area use pangolin scales, bones, head, and meat for non-medical purposes. Pangolins scales are used for spiritual protection, financial rituals, and protection from witchcraft. The bones are used for spiritual protection and protection from witchcraft. The head of a pangolin is used for spiritual protection and financial rituals. The meat of a pangolin is used to create charms for tribal chiefs and pangolin tail is used as a romantic aid.

In the Bombali district of Sierra Leone, scales, meat, blood, intestines, claws, and whole pangolin are part of the pangolin body are used. The scales of the pangolin are used to make one invulnerable to bullets or cuts, to provide protection from witchcraft, and other forms of spiritual protection. The meat of a pangolin is used to increase intelligence of an individual, and the tail of a pangolin is used to prevent against a snake bite and to provide spiritual protection. The blood and claws of a pangolin is used for protection against witchcraft while the intestines of the pangolin are used for good luck.

== Conservation and enforcement ==
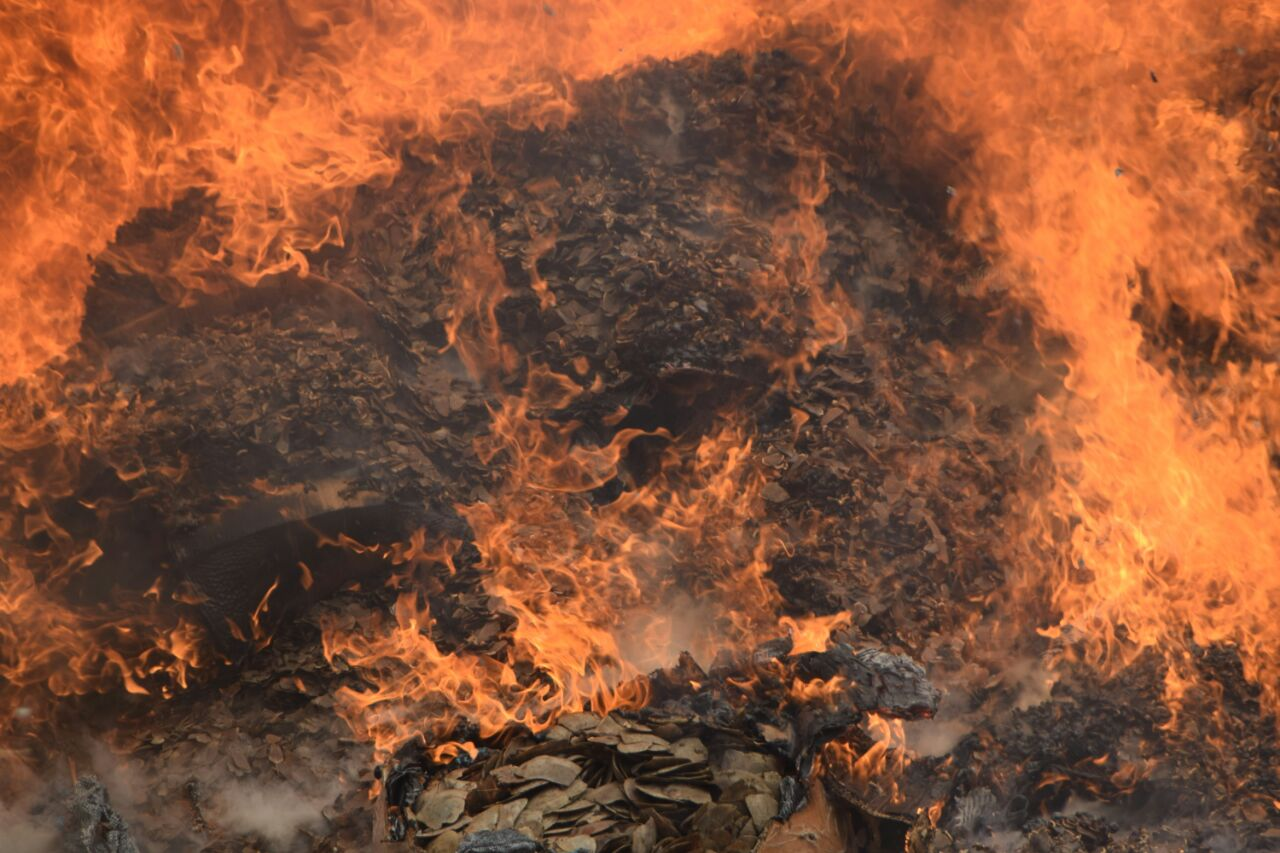
8 tonnes of confiscated pangolin scales burning in Cameroon in 2017

Governments and non-governmental organizations have undertaken a variety of conservation efforts, with varying activities and degrees of success in different parts of the world. The IUCN's Species Survival Commission formed a Pangolin Specialist Group in 2012, comprising 100 experts from 25 countries, hosted by the Zoological Society of London. It also coordinated an annual awareness day, World Pangolin Day, on February 15, starting in 2014. In China, publicity campaigns against the trade in pangolin parts have attracted the support of celebrities including Angelababy and Jackie Chan since 2016.

Public awareness and support for conservation efforts can be important to their success. According to Annette Olsson, technical advisor at Conservation International, one of the problems the pangolin faces is that, unlike more well-known endangered animals like elephants, rhinoceroses, pandas, or tigers, "It's not huge and not very charismatic. It's small and weird and just disappearing." Legal measures focus on curbing poaching and the supply side of the market, while media attention and public awareness can be crucial to the success to animal conservation efforts by affecting demand. According to CNN's John D. Sutter, "the pangolin needs international celebrity to survive, and the CITES vote is a critical step toward achieving that celebrity." In some part due to lack of attention, pangolin conservation has not been a significant recipient of funding from governments or NGOs.

Declining numbers of pangolin population also has detrimental effects on the ecosystem. The pangolins diet consists mainly of ants and termites in which they help with stabilizing forest pest destruction and controls forest termite disasters. When foraging for their food by digging through the ground, pangolins actually help aerate the soil and assists in the process of decomposing organic matter. Additionally, though some pangolin species sleep in trees, others sleep in burrows they dig underground. But, pangolins frequently abandon their burrows which allows other animals to use it for themselves, helping out the rest of the animal kingdom. On 17 February 2017, a day before World Pangolin Day, officials in Cameroon burned 3 tonnes of confiscated pangolin scales, representing up to 10,000 animals. The Cameroonian government had confiscated more than 8 tonnes of pangolin scales since 2013. This conservation strategy is similar to the increasingly common destroying confiscated ivory to deter poaching and generate public outrage or action. As with ivory, there is an opportunity cost to destroying the material, trading awareness via public spectacle for the money which could be gained by reselling what was confiscated.

In Vietnam, one of the countries in which the pangolin trade is most active, activists have access to only two centers able to take care of pangolins, and together they can only keep 50 animals in total. CNN characterized Vietnamese activists as having "vastly inadequate support."

A significant challenge to conservationists is the difficulty pangolins have in captivity. The animals do not adapt well to alternative or artificial foods and suffer stress, depression and malnutrition, leading to significantly shortened lifespans. For these reasons they are rarely found in zoos or visible to the public while alive. For example, as of 2015, the only zoo in the United States to have a pangolin is the San Diego Zoo, and only one because the other died due to digestive problems. Part of the problem, which is also a major cause of the problem, is that without the ability to observe healthy pangolins in captivity, there is still a lot about pangolins humans have not yet been able to learn – variety in their diet, maximum lifespan, maximum size, mating habits, and many aspects of their behavior.

In an episode of the BBC programme Natural World, David Attenborough highlighted the Sunda pangolin as one of the ten species he would like to save from extinction, recalling rescuing "one of the most endearing animals I have ever met" from being eaten while working on a film early in his career.

In January 2022, an endangered pangolin was captured and "held hostage" by rebels in the DRC. They demanded ransom money from conservationists in exchange for the animal's release.
