= Smutsia olteniensis =

Smutsia olteniensis Temporal range: 2.2–1.9 Ma early Pleistocene

Scientific classification
- Kingdom: Animalia
- Phylum: Chordata
- Class: Mammalia
- Order: Pholidota
- Family: Manidae
- Genus: Smutsia
- Species: †S. olteniensis

Binomial name
- †Smutsia olteniensis Terhune, Gaudin, Curran & Petculescu, 2021

Synonyms
- Smutsia hungarica (Terhune, 2021)

Extinct species

Smutsia olteniensis ("pangolin from Olt") is an extinct species of pangolins from genus Smutsia of subfamily Smutsiinae within family Manidae. Fossilized remains of the species were found in Romania, providing evidence regarding the existence of pangolins in Europe during the Plio-Pleistocene period.

== Description ==
The appearance of Smutsia olteniensis is assumed to be closely similar to that of its two extant relatives, Smutsia gigantea and Smutsia temminckii, the giant pangolin and ground pangolin, respectively.

Analysis of a right humerus of Smutsia olteniensis, as well as comparison with extant Smutsia pangolins and a Pliocene humerus belonging to Smutsia gigantea, has led to the discovery of several major differences among the specimen humeri, warranting the creation of a new species. Based on this humerus, the estimated size of Smutsia olteniensis identifies it as smaller than extant adult giant pangolins (normally recorded weighing around 30 kg), making it comparable in size to a juvenile Smutsia gigantea, but larger than the Pliocene counterpart. Humerus size also places it as substantially larger than Smutsia temminckii, the ground pangolin. The majority of bone features suggest that the specimen is closer in morphology to extant pangolin species than any pre-Pliocene fossils. Broadly speaking, the specimen appears to be most similar to the giant pangolin (Smutsia gigantea), but does share some bone resemblance with the ground pangolin (Smutsia temminckii), such as its globose capitulum. It also has some very meaningful differences in bone structure from both of these mentioned species, such as a larger supinator crest, which has been significantly identified as a feature found in older pangolin fossils.

== Discovery and naming ==
A humerus was recovered in the 1960s from the fossil locality of Graunceanu, located in the Oltet River valley of Romania. This region was explored extensively in the 1960s, with multiple fossil localities named in the vicinity of the village of Tetoui. Previous reports and publications regarding the site communicated a difficult to identify species, likely of the genus Manis; however, they did not choose to go into detail on the fossil. Thus, recent reanalysis has expanded information on fauna from the Graunceanu region, as well as other fossil localities existing in the surrounding area. A right humerus was accessioned, catalogued, and photographed in a reinventory process, with prior records and inventories from the original excavation having been lost.

It became clear during the process that the humerus derived from a pangolin, specifically a member of the ground pangolin genus Smutsia. Although very similar to the giant pangolin (Smutsia gigantea) in most respects, the humerus also shared similarities with other extant pangolins, as well as major differences. Unique features justified the creation of a novel species, Smutsia olteniensis. This notably confirmed the presence of pangolins in Pleistocene Europe, while placing the specimen into the genus Smutsia, present today only in Africa.

The species name recognizes the origin of the humerus fossil that determined it as a new species, found in the region of Oltenia, Romania.

== Behavior ==
It is difficult to infer the behavior of Smutsia olteniensis based on its fossil record alone, however specific traits and adaptations shared with the Smutsia genus, as well as among pangolins as a whole, makes it very likely Smutsia olteniensis acted similarly to its extant relatives.

== Taxonomy ==
Of the three species currently recognised with the genus, Smutsia gigantea and Smutsia temminckii are still in existence, while Smutsia olteniensis is thought to have lived around 1.9 to 2.2 million years ago. The fossil record suggests that Smutsia olteniensis may have been more closely related to Smutsia gigantea, the giant pangolin.

== See also ==
- Mammal classification
- Smutsia
