= Eco Defense Group =

- Founded: 2017; 9 years ago
- Founder: Nathan Edmondson
- Type: Non-profit
- Purpose: Environmentalism
- Location: Park City, Utah United States
- Region served: Africa
- Method: Special operations, Park ranger training
- Website: www.ecodefensegroup.org

Eco Defense Group is an American non-profit that sends Special forces operators to develop and train wildlife conservation forces on the African continent.

== History ==
Eco Defense Group operates by invitation only. It is dedicated to leveraging asymmetric advantaged in anti-poaching efforts and supports Rangers on the frontlines through training and equipment. In March 2020, the US Office of Defense Cooperation brought Eco Defense Group to South Africa during the quarantine for a multi-day skills training program with South African National Parks and NCC Environmental Services firefighters.

== See also ==
- Rhinoceros poaching in Southern Africa
- Pangolin trade
