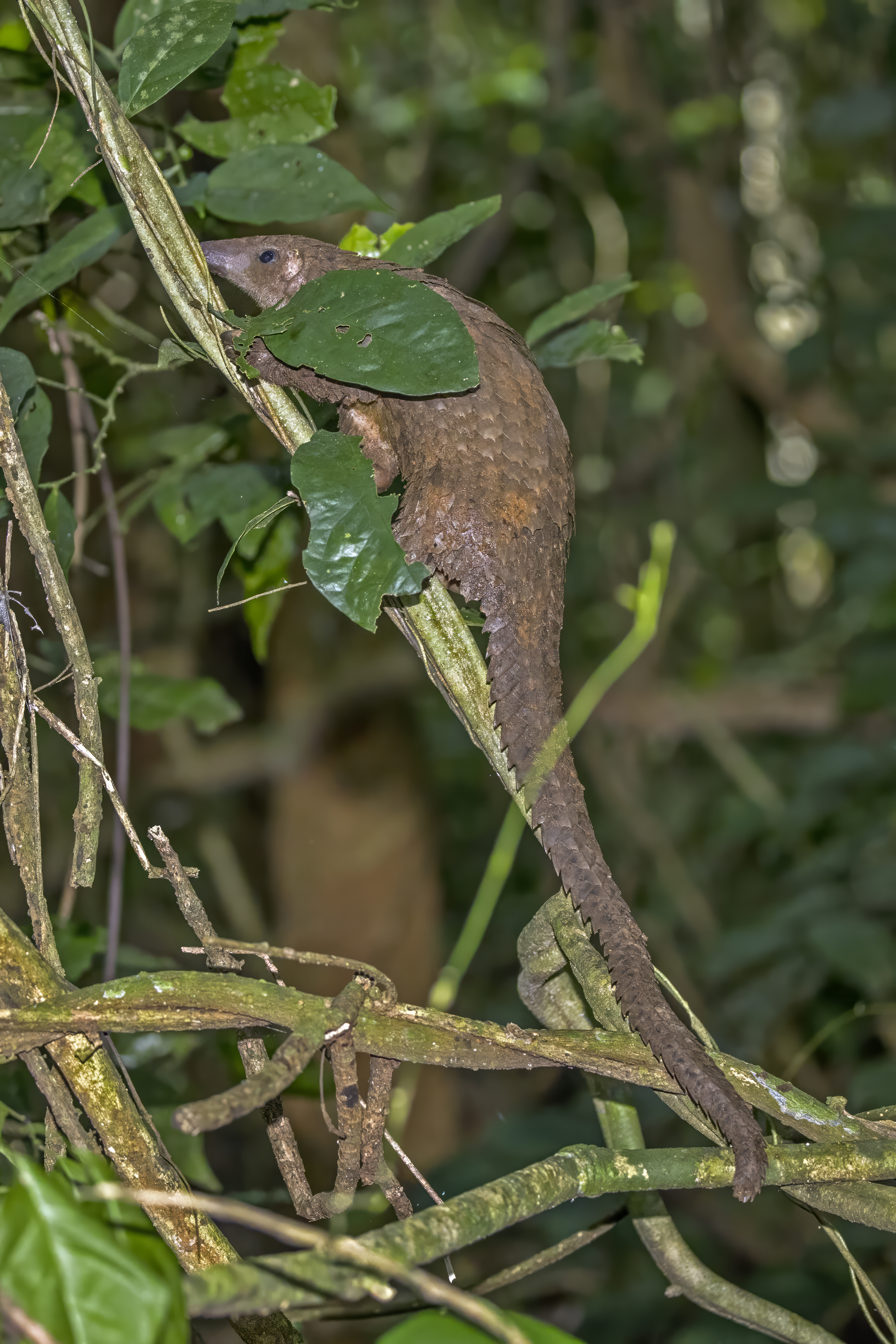
- In Nyamebe Bepo Forest Reserve, Ashanti Region, Ghana

Conservation status
- Endangered (IUCN 3.1)
- CITES Appendix I

Scientific classification
- Kingdom: Animalia
- Phylum: Chordata
- Class: Mammalia
- Order: Pholidota
- Family: Manidae
- Genus: Phataginus
- Species: P. tricuspis

Binomial name
- Phataginus tricuspis (Rafinesque, 1821)
- Distribution of the white-bellied pangolin

= White-bellied pangolin =

White-bellied pangolin Temporal range: 6.93–0 Ma late Miocene - present

Species of mammal

The white-bellied pangolin (Phataginus tricuspis) is one of eight extant species of pangolins ("scaly anteaters"), and is native to equatorial Africa. Also known as the tree pangolin or three-cusped pangolin, it is the most common of the African forest pangolins.

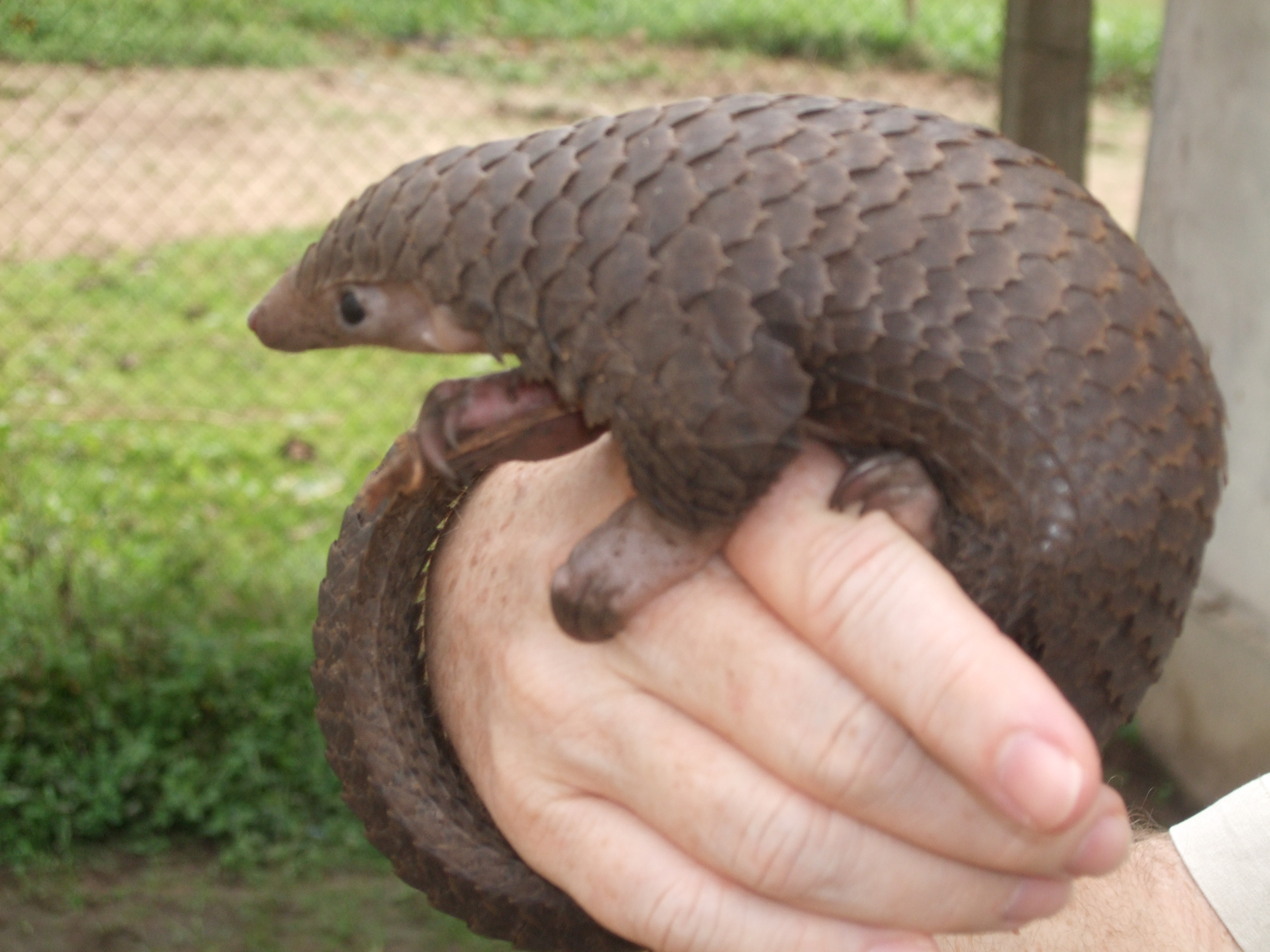
In the Democratic Republic of the Congo

== Description ==
Phataginus tricuspis is a relatively small pangolin. The combined head and body length is 33–43 cm (13–17 in). The tail is 49–62 cm (19–24 in). Each dark brown to brownish yellow scale has three points, to which the specific name tricuspis refers. (The Greek meaning of Phataginus tricuspis is "number by order"),These scales cover the whole body besides the face, underbelly, and insides of the legs. The scales are made of keratin, as are human fingernails, and are anchored at the base to the pangolin's skin. The head is small, and the snout is elongated. The feet are short, and each foot has five long curved claws.

== Taxonomy ==
The white-bellied pangolin had belonged to the genus Manis and subgenus Phataginus before the latter was elevated to generic status. Two subspecies were recognized in 1972 by Meester:

- P. t. tricuspis
- P. t. mabirae (Uganda)

The white-bellied pangolin, along with the long-tailed pangolin, make up the genus Phataginus (the African tree pangolins). This makes Phataginus tetradactyla the closest relative to Phataginus tricuspis.

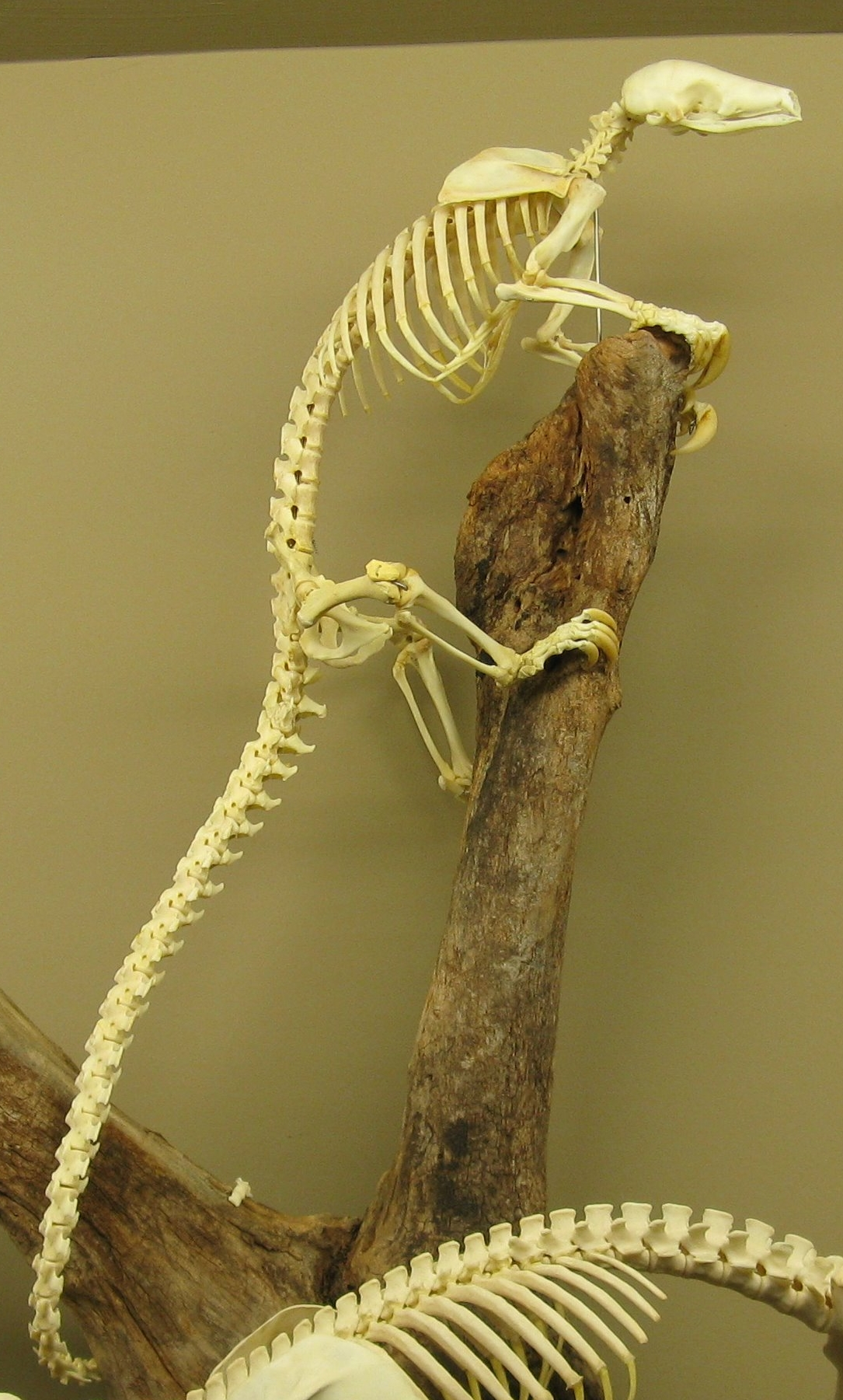
A white-bellied pangolin skeleton on display at The Museum of Osteology

== Range and habitat ==
The white-bellied pangolin ranges from Guinea through Sierra Leone and much of West Africa to Central Africa as far east as extreme southwestern Kenya and northwestern Tanzania. To the south, it extends to northern Angola and northwestern Zambia. It has been found on the Atlantic island of Bioko, but no records confirm a presence in Senegal, Gambia, or Guinea-Bissau.

The white-bellied pangolin is semiarboreal and generally nocturnal. It is found in lowland tropical moist forests (both primary and secondary), as well as savanna/forest mosaics. It probably adapts to some degree to habitat modification, such as commercial plantations, as it favours cultivated and fallow land where it is not aggressively hunted (e.g., abandoned or little-used oil palm trees in secondary growth).

== Behavior ==
The white-bellied pangolin can walk on all fours or on its hind legs using its prehensile tail for balance. It can climb up trees in the absence of branches. When walking on all fours, it walks on its front knuckles with its claws tucked underneath to protect them from wearing down. Its anal scent glands disperse a foul secretion much like a skunk when threatened. It has a well-developed sense of smell, but as a nocturnal animal, it has poor eyesight. Instead of teeth, it has a gizzard-like stomach full of stones and sand it ingests. The white-bellied pangolin in Africa fills its stomach with air before entering water to aid in buoyancy for well-developed swimming.

The white-bellied pangolin has many adaptations. When threatened, it rolls up into a ball ("volvation"), protecting itself with its thick skin and scales. Its scales cover its entire body except for the belly, snout, eyes, ears, and undersides of the limbs. When a mother with young is threatened, she rolls up around the young, which also rolls into a ball. While in a ball, she can extend her scales and make a cutting action by using muscles to move the scales back and forth. She makes an aggressive huff noise when threatened, but that is the extent of her noise-making.

== Diet ==
The white-bellied pangolin eats insects such as ants and termites from their nests, or the armies of insects moving on the trees. This form of diet is called myrmecophagy. It relies on its thick skin for protection, and digs into burrows with its long, clawed forefeet. It eats between 5 and 7 ounces (150 to 200 g) of insects a day. The pangolin uses its 10- to 27-in (250- to 700-mm) tongue which is coated with gummy alkaline mucus to funnel the insects into its mouth. The base of the tongue is attached to the end of the xiphoid process of the sternum in the abdominal cavity.

== Reproduction ==
Female pangolin territories are solitary and small, less than 10 acres (4 ha), and they rarely overlap. Males have larger territories, up to 60 acres (24 ha), which overlap many female territories, resulting in male/female meetings. Pangolins can demonstrate their availability through feces and urine markings as well as by spreading the scent produced by their anal glands. The meetings between males and females are brief unless the female is in estrus, when mating occurs. Gestation of young lasts 150 days, and one young per birth is normal. The young pangolin cannot walk at birth so it is carried on its mother's tail. It is weaned after three months, but it remains with its mother for five months in total. At first, the newborn's scales are soft, but, after a few days, they start to harden.

== Use by humans ==
The white-bellied pangolin is subject to widespread and often intensive exploitation for bushmeat and traditional medicine, and is by far the most common of the pangolins found in African bushmeat markets. Conservationists believe this species underwent a decline of 20–25% between 1993 and 2008 (three pangolin generations) due mainly to the impact of the bushmeat hunting. They assert it continues to be harvested at unsustainable levels in some of its range. Its conservation status has been progressively elevated over time, from "Least Concern" in 1996 to "Endangered" by 2019.
