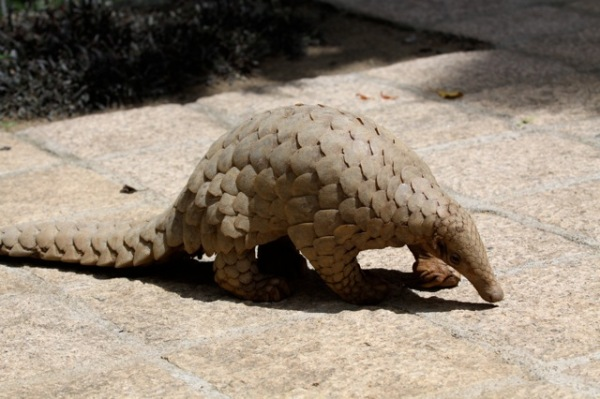
- Indian pangolin in Kandy, Sri Lanka

Conservation status
- Endangered (IUCN 3.1)
- CITES Appendix I

Scientific classification
- Kingdom: Animalia
- Phylum: Chordata
- Class: Mammalia
- Order: Pholidota
- Family: Manidae
- Genus: Manis
- Species: M. crassicaudata

Binomial name
- Manis crassicaudata E. Geoffroy, 1803

= Indian pangolin =

Species of mammal

The Indian pangolin (Manis crassicaudata), also called thick-tailed pangolin and scaly anteater, is a pangolin native to the Indian subcontinent. Like other pangolins, it has large, overlapping scales on its body which act as armour. The colour of its scales varies depending on the colour of the earth in its surroundings. It can also curl itself into a ball as self-defence against predators such as the tiger. It is an insectivore feeding on ants and termites, digging them out of mounds and logs using its long claws, which are as long as its fore limbs. It is nocturnal and rests in deep burrows during the day.

It is not common anywhere in its range, and is threatened by hunting for its meat and various body parts used in traditional medicine.

== Characteristics ==
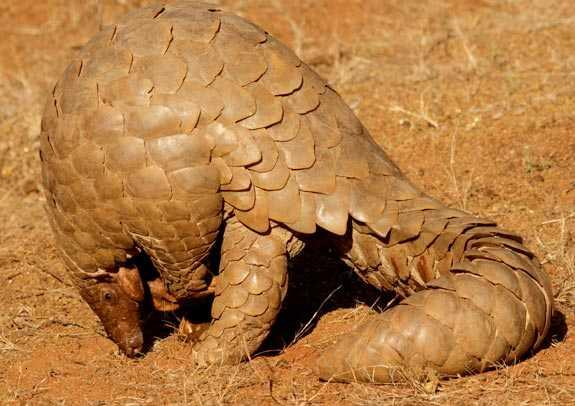
Indian pangolin in Gir forest, Gujarat

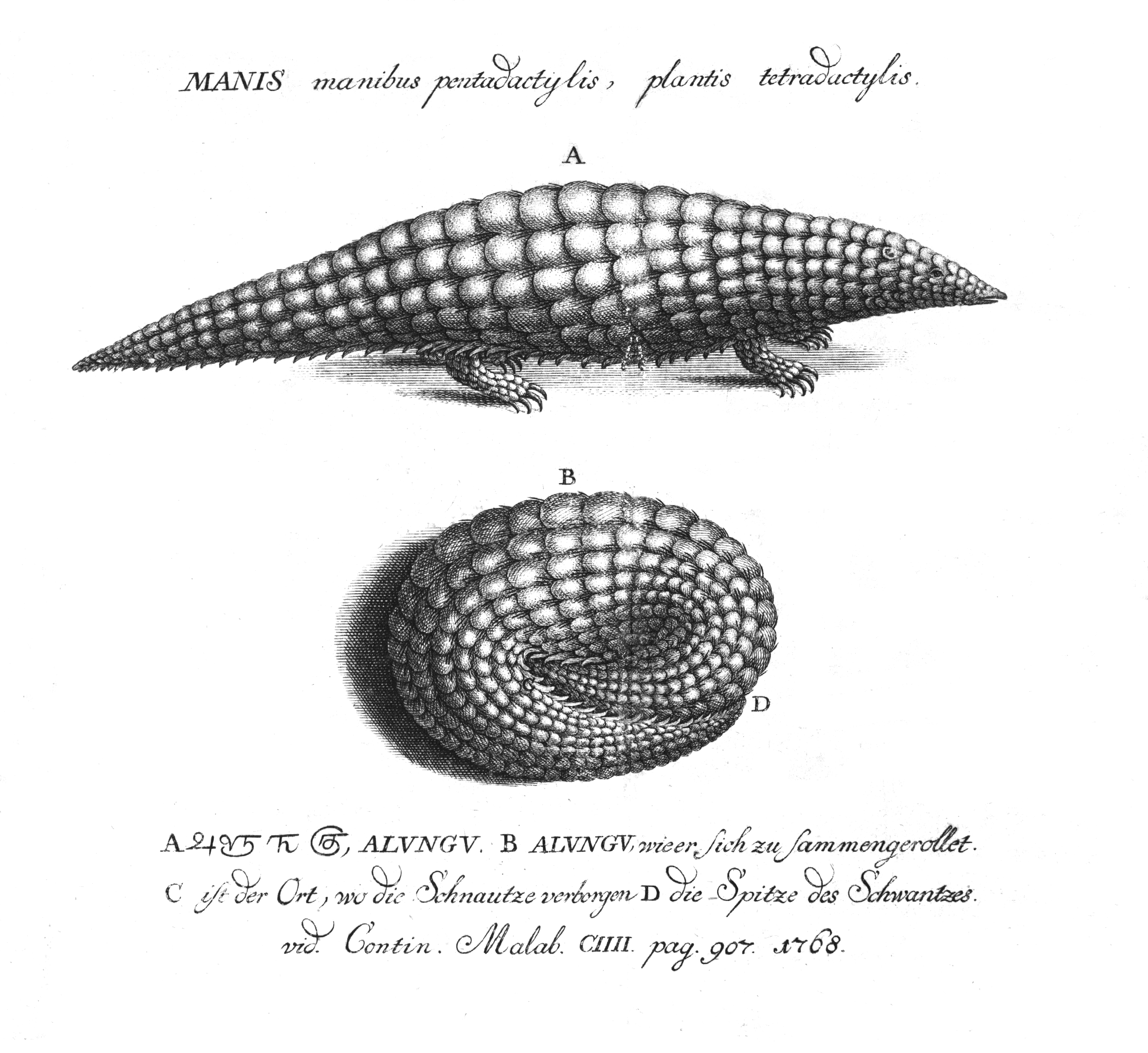
An early illustration of the "alungu" from Tharangambadi, 1768

The Indian pangolin is a solitary, shy, slow-moving, nocturnal mammal. It is about 84–122 cm (33–48 in) long from head to tail, the tail usually being 33–47 cm (13–19 in) long, and weighs 10–16 kg (22–35 lb). Females are generally smaller than the males and have one pair of mammae. The pangolin possesses a cone-shaped head with small, dark eyes, and a long muzzle with a nose pad similar in color, or darker than, its pinkish-brown skin. It has powerful limbs, tipped with sharp, clawed digits. The pangolin has no teeth, but has strong stomach muscles to aid in digestion. The most noticeable characteristic of the pangolin is its massive, scaled armour which covers its upper face and its whole body with the exception of the belly and the inside of the legs. These protective scales are rigid and made of keratin. It has 160–200 scales in total, about 40–46% of which are located on the tail. Scales are 6.5–7 cm (2.6–2.8 in) long, 8.5 cm (3.3 in) wide, and weigh 7–10 g (0.25–0.35 oz). The skin and scales make up about one-fourth to one-third of the total body mass of this species.

== Distribution and habitat ==
The Indian pangolin has been recorded in various forest types, including Sri Lankan rainforest and plains to middle hill levels. It inhabits grasslands and secondary forests, and is well adapted to dry areas and desert regions, but prefers more barren, hilly regions. In Sri Lanka, it was sighted at an elevation of 1,100 m (3,600 ft), and in the Nilgiri mountains at 2,300 m (7,500 ft). It prefers soft and semi-sandy soil conditions suitable for digging burrows.

== Behaviour and ecology ==
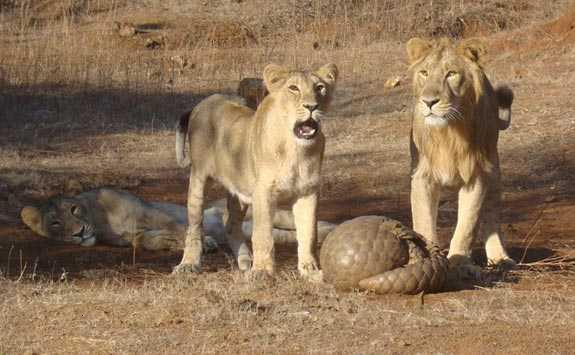
Defending itself from Asiatic lions

The Indian pangolin is nocturnal and mostly active intermittently between 17:00 and 05:00 hr. The peak period of activity was observed between 20:00–21:00 hr in captive individuals with some individual variation.

The Indian pangolin does not climb trees, but it does value the presence of trees, herbs, and shrubs in its habitat because it is easier to dig burrows around them. Features that promote an abundance of ants and termites like grasses, bare grounds, bases of trees, shrubs, roots, leaf litter, fallen logs and elephant feces are often present in pangolin habitats.

Pangolin burrows fall into one of two categories: feeding and living burrows. Feeding burrows are smaller than living burrows (though their sizes vary depending on the abundance of prey) and are created more frequently during the spring, when there is a greater availability of prey. Living burrows are wider, deeper, and more circular, and are occupied for a longer time than feeding burrows, as they are mainly used to sleep and rest during the day. After a few months, the pangolin abandons the burrow and digs a new one close to a food source. However, it is not uncommon for the pangolin to shift back to an old burrow.

=== Diet ===
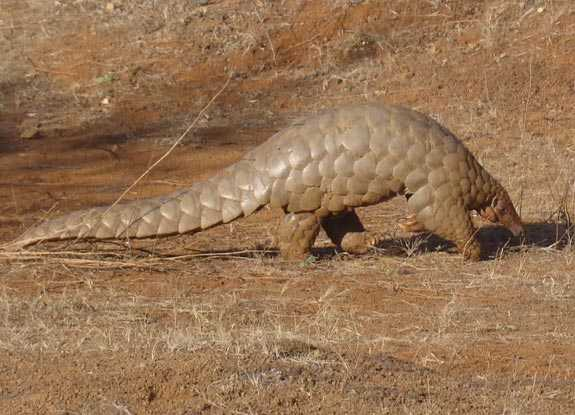
Walking

The Indian pangolin is an almost exclusive insectivore and principally subsists on ants and termites, which it catches with a specially adapted long, sticky tongue. It is specialised to feed on ants and termites, but also forages for beetles and cockroaches. It feeds on the eggs, larvae, and adults of its prey, but eggs are the preferred choice. In the Potohar region of the Punjab province, the majority of its diet was found to consist of two types of ants, Camponotus confuci and Camponotus compressus. Other matter such as plant matter, stones, sand, and clay are consumed as well and in concert with strong stomach muscles aid in breaking down the food in the stomach. The Indian pangolin is nocturnal and uses its well-developed sense of smell to locate ant nests or termite mounds and other food sources. Foraging mostly takes place on the ground but may include arboreal ants, as seen in the rainforest canopy of Sri Lanka. Pangolins tear apart and dig into mounds by using the three centre claws on their forefeet, throwing loose soil backwards with their hind feet. When feeding, the rostral part of the pangolin's tongue is quickly inserted and withdrawn to capture prey. This movement is also used for drinking.

=== Reproduction ===
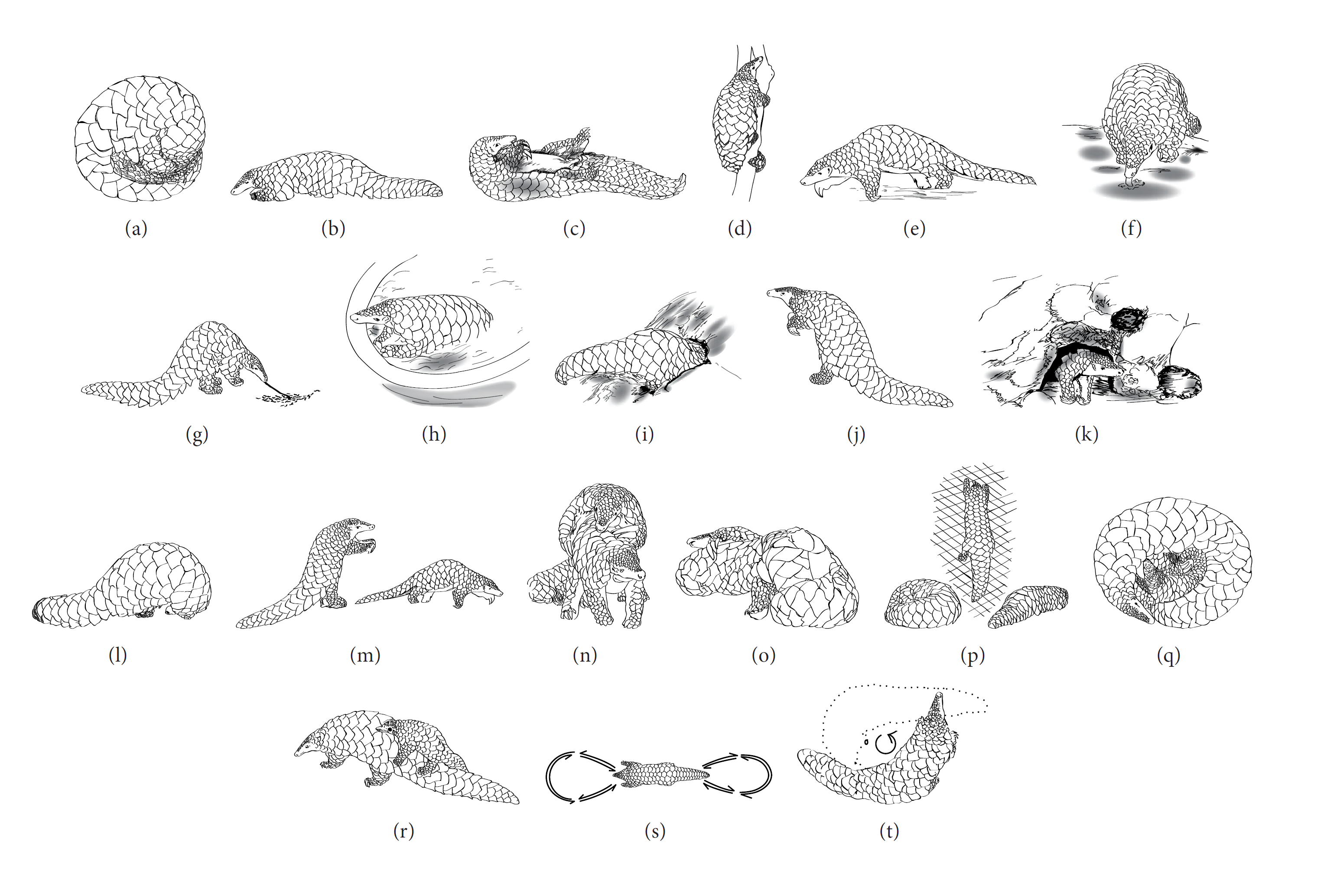

Few details are known about the breeding behaviour of the Indian pangolin. During the animal's mating period, females and males may share the same burrow and show some diurnal activities. Males have testes in a fold of the skin located in their groin areas. The female's embryo develops in one of the uterine horns. The gestation period lasts 65–70 days; the placenta is diffuse and not deciduate. Usually, a single young is born, but twins have been reported in this species. The young weigh 235–400 g at birth and measure roughly 30 cm. The newborn animals have open eyes, and soft scales with protruding hairs between them. The mother pangolin carries her young on her tail. When the mother and young are disturbed, the young pangolin is held against its mother's belly and protected by the mother's tail.

== Threats ==
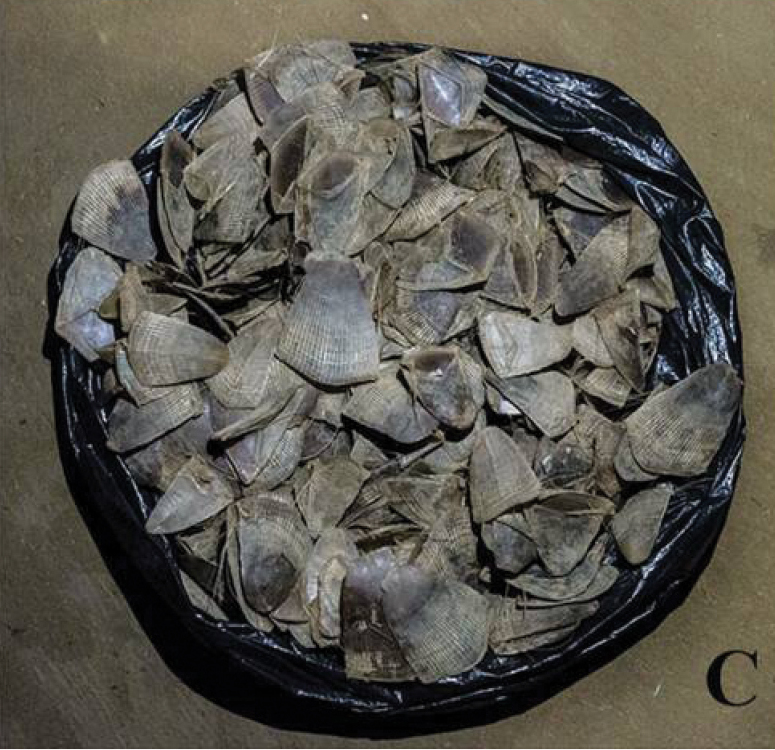
Bag of pangolin scales intended for sale

The Indian pangolin is threatened by poaching for its meat and scales, which are used and consumed by local people, but are also increasingly traded internationally. Various parts of the pangolin are valued as sources of food and medicine. The scales are used as an aphrodisiac, or made into rings or charms. The skins are used to manufacture leather goods, including boots and shoes. The majority of hunting is carried out by nomads and trained local hunters. Indian pangolin body parts have been trafficked for consumption in China since at least the early 2000s. Pangolins are the most heavily trafficked protected mammals. Other threats include habitat loss, e.g. through deforestation.

== Conservation ==
The Indian pangolin is listed on CITES Appendix I since January 2017 and is protected in all range countries.

=== In captivity ===
Successful reproduction by Indian pangolins has been reported from several zoos, including Calcutta Zoo, Oklahoma Zoo, and Nandankanan Zoological Park. Pangolins were found to not show any significant morphological changes during pregnancy. Births in captivity have been reported throughout the year except for May and June. At birth a baby pangolin weighed 235 g and measured 30 cm in total length, including 12.5 cm of tail. A three-day-old Indian pangolin born at Oklahoma Zoo measured 310 mm from tip to tip with a 125 mm tail.
