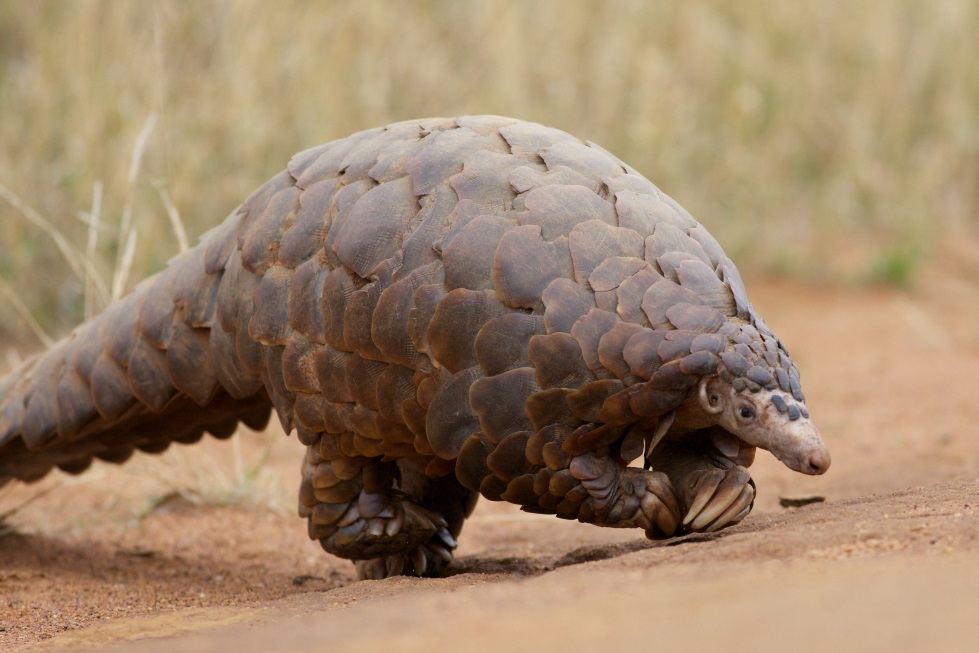
- A ground pangolin in the wilds of Africa
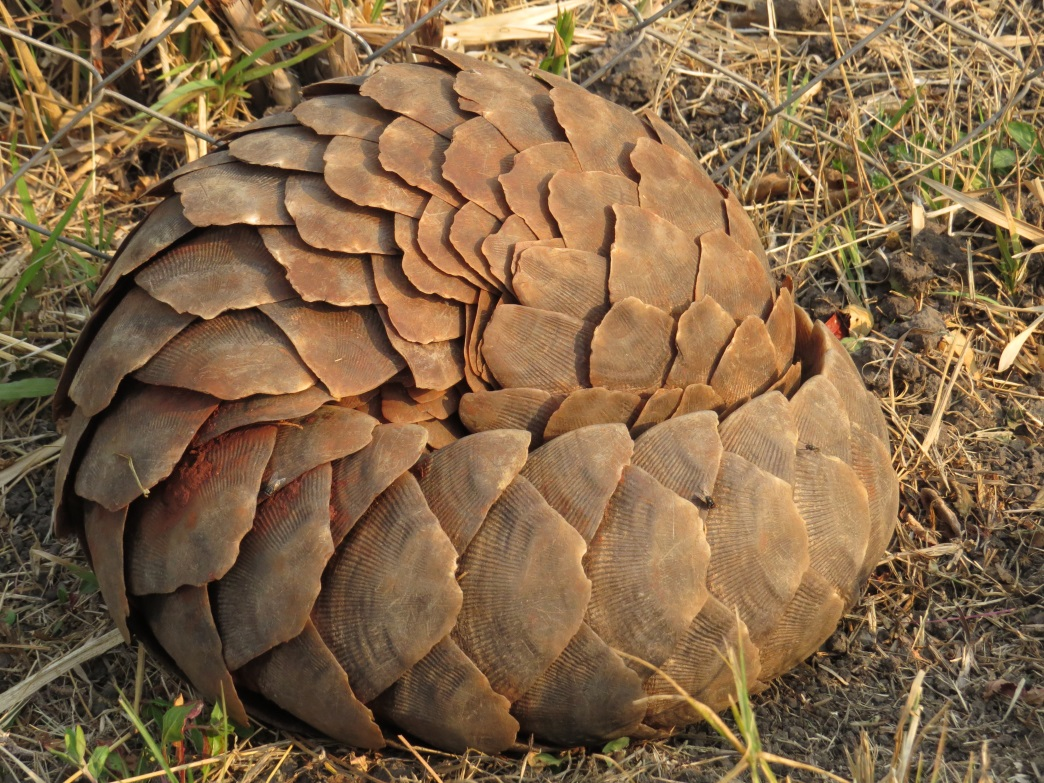
- A ground pangolin in defensive posture

Conservation status
- Vulnerable (IUCN 3.1)
- CITES Appendix I

Scientific classification
- Kingdom: Animalia
- Phylum: Chordata
- Class: Mammalia
- Order: Pholidota
- Family: Manidae
- Genus: Smutsia
- Species: S. temminckii

Binomial name
- Smutsia temminckii Smuts, 1832
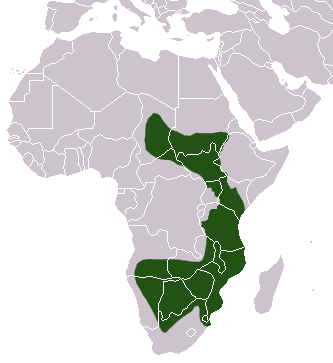
- Ground pangolin range

Synonyms
- synonyms of species: Manis temminckii (Smuts, 1832); Phatages hedenborgii (Fitzinger, 1872); Phataginus temminckii

= Ground pangolin =

Ground pangolin Temporal range: middle Pleistocene - present

Species of mammal

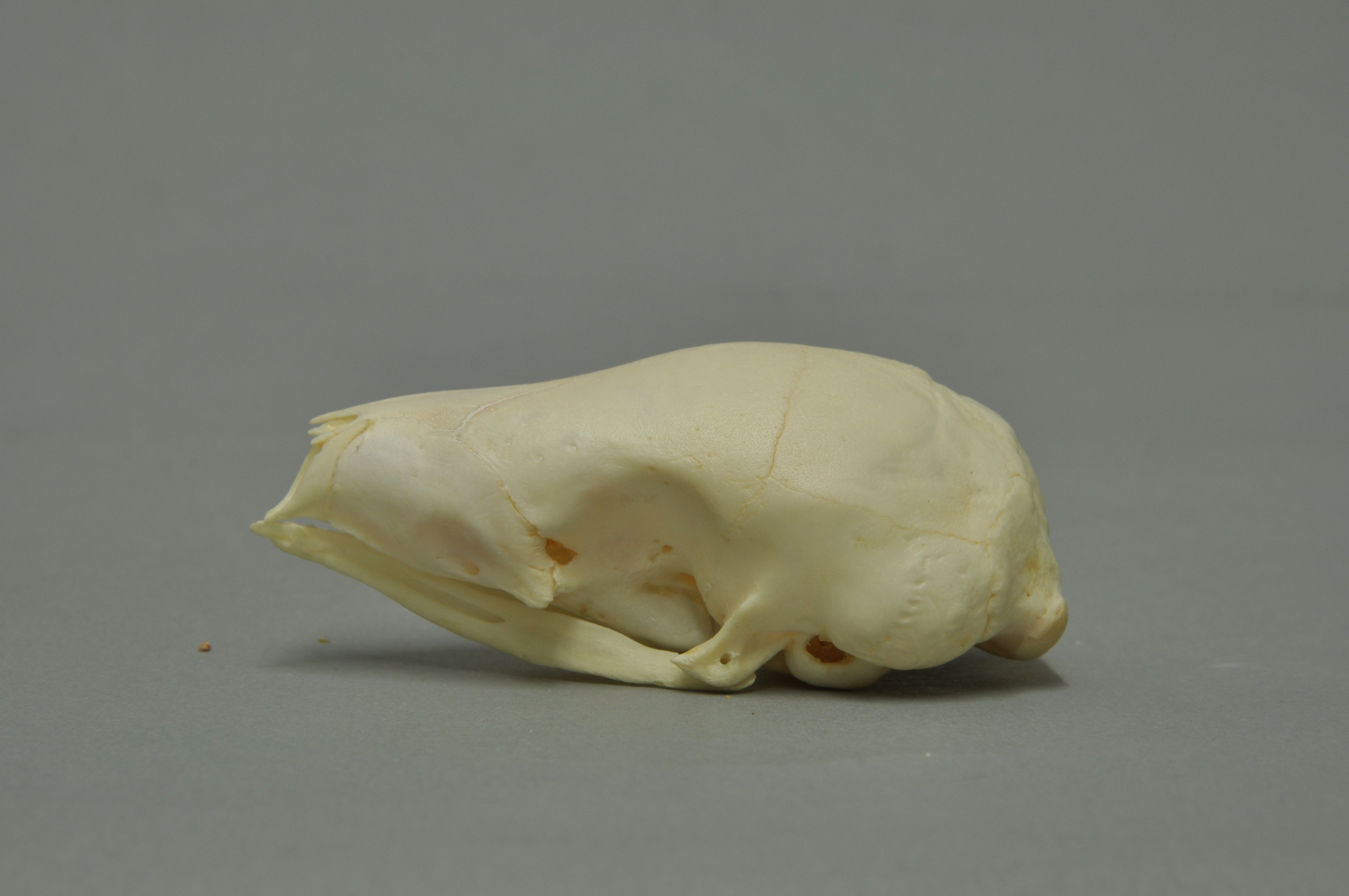
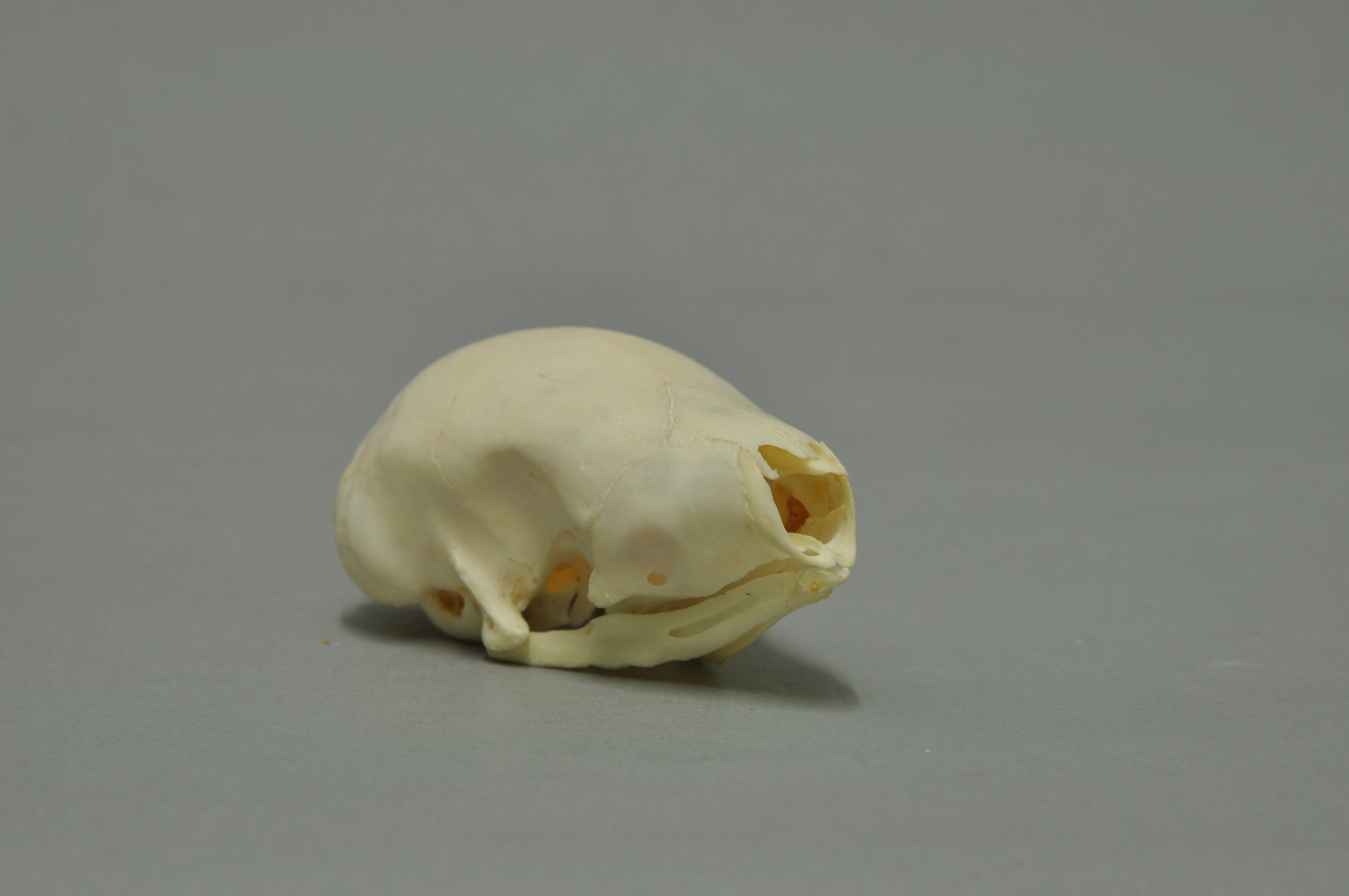
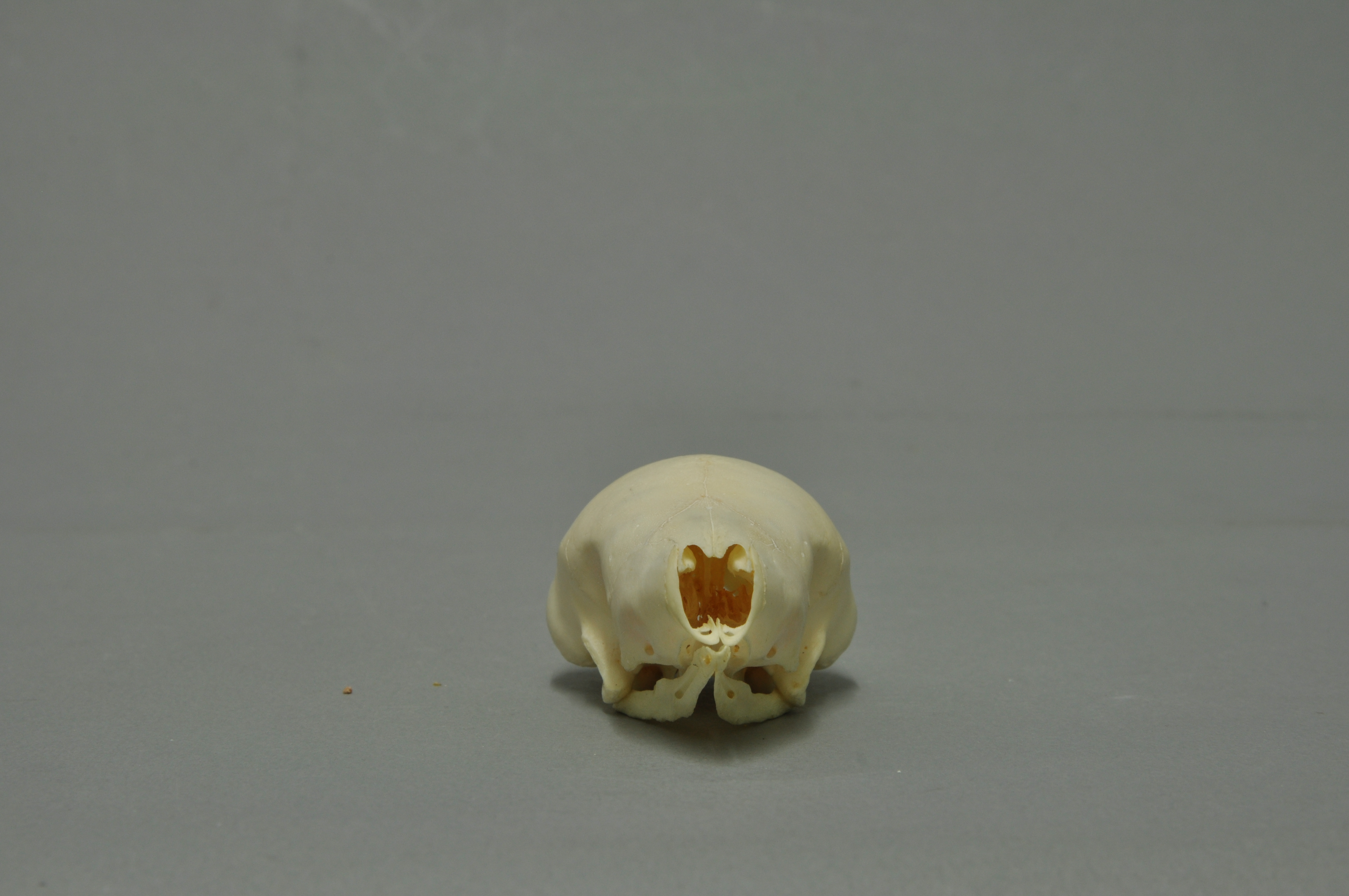
Skull of a ground pangolin

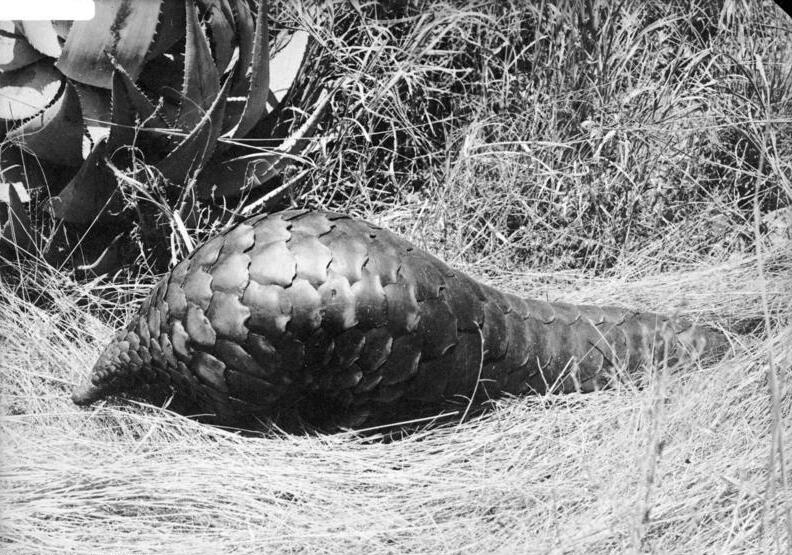
Pangolin photographed in Tanzania around 1910

The ground pangolin (Smutsia temminckii), also known as Temminck's pangolin, Cape pangolin or steppe pangolin is a species of pangolin from genus Smutsia of subfamily Smutsiinae the within family Manidae. It is one of four species of pangolins which can be found in Africa, and the only one in southern and eastern Africa. The animal was named for the Dutch zoologist Coenraad Jacob Temminck.

== Physical description ==
Pangolins are almost completely covered in overlapping, protective scales, which makes up about 20% of their body weight. The scales are composed of keratin, the same material that forms human hair and fingernails, and give pangolins an appearance similar to a pinecone or artichoke. The underside of a pangolin is not covered with scales, but sparse fur, instead. When threatened, it usually rolls up into a ball, thus protecting its vulnerable belly. Pangolins are 30 to 90 cm (12 to 35 in) long exclusive of the tail and weigh from 5 to 27 kg (11 to 60 lb). Across all eight species, adult tail length ranges from about 26 to 70 cm (10 to 28 in). Mature adults are light brown, olive, and dark brown in color, while young are pale brown or pink in color.

Ground pangolins walk on their hind legs, occasionally using their forelegs and their tail for balance. They have five toes on each hind foot, while their forelimbs feature three long, curved central claws, accompanied by two smaller claws on the first and fifth digits. The muscular forelimbs and central claws are adapted for breaking into ant and termite colonies, as well as excavating burrows. Because of these claws, pangolins must balance on the outer edges of their fore feet and tuck in the claws to prevent damage. Pangolins have long, broad tails and small, conical heads with jaws that lack teeth. To replace the act of chewing, the pangolin stomach is muscular, with keratinous spines that project into the interior and contains small stones to mash and grind prey, similarly to a bird's gizzard. Pangolins also have long, muscular tongues to reach and lap up ants and termites in cavities. Their tongues stretch so far, they are actually longer than their bodies. The tongue is attached in the lower cavity, near the pelvis and the last pair of ribs, and is able to retract and rest in the chest cavity. Pangolins have reduced pinnae, so they have poor hearing, as well as poor vision, although they do have a strong sense of smell.

== Range and distribution ==
The African pangolin species are native to 15 African countries dispersed throughout southern, central, and east Africa. S. temminckii is the only species found in southern and eastern Africa. It prefers savannah woodland with moderate amounts of scrub at low elevations.

== Behavior and social organization ==
Little is known about the pangolin, as it is difficult to study in the wild. Pangolins are solitary animals and only interact for mating. They dig and live in deep burrows made of semispherical chambers. These burrows are large enough for humans to crawl into and stand up. Although it is capable of digging its own burrow, the ground pangolin prefers to occupy those abandoned by warthogs or aardvarks or to lie in dense vegetation, making it even more difficult to observe. African pangolins such as the ground pangolin prefer burrows, while Asian pangolins sleep in hollows and forks of trees and logs. They are nocturnal animals. They mark their territory with urine, secretions, and by scattering their feces. When threatened, their defense mechanism is to curl into a ball with their scales outward, hiss and puff, and lash out with their sharp-edged tails. The scales on the tails are capable of a cutting action to inflict serious wounds. Pangolins are also capable of emitting noxious acid from glands near the anus, similar to a skunk, to ward off predators. The ground pangolin's main predators are leopards, hyenas, and humans. Pangolins roll in herbivore dung. Young pangolins ride on the base of their mothers' tails and slip under the mother when she curls up for protection.

== Diet ==
The ground pangolin is wholly myrmecophagous, meaning that they only feed on ants and termites. In fact, they demonstrate prey selectivity, only eating specific ant and termite species rather than foraging on the most abundant species. They have been observed exposing entire subterranean nests of a certain species of termites without eating any, preferring to find their species of choice. Their determination of suitable prey does not seem to be based on the size of the species alone, but likely also depends on the chemical and mechanical defenses of each species. Even in arid environments, ground pangolins remain selective in their dietary habits with regard to prey species and only prey on a small subset of available ant and termite species.

== Reproduction and lifecycle ==
The lifespan of the pangolin is unknown, but the observed lifespan in captivity is 20 years. They are sexually dimorphic, with the males being 10–50% heavier than females. No defined mating season is known, but pangolins tend to mate during the summer and autumn. The gestation period ranges up to 139 days for ground pangolins and other African species. African species females usually birth only one offspring, but litters of three have been observed in Asian species. When born, a pangolin has soft, pale scales, which begin to harden by the second day. The young are usually about 15 cm (5.9 in) long and about 340.19 g (12.0 oz) at birth. They are nursed by their mothers for 3 to 4 months, but begin eating termites after only one month. Pangolins reach sexual maturity at 2 years old, when they leave their mothers and begin living alone.

== Conservation status and threats ==
The ground pangolin is listed as vulnerable by the IUCN Red List. The assessors state, "there is an inferred past/ongoing and projected future population reduction of 30–40% over a 27-year period (nine years past, 18 years future; generation length estimated at nine years) based primarily on ongoing exploitation for traditional medicine and bushmeat throughout the species' range and evidence of increased intercontinental trade to Asia."

The two main threats encountered by ground pangolin populations are habitat loss and illegal trafficking. Due to human cultivation of land, the pangolin faces habitat fragmentation and corresponding reduction in numbers. Meanwhile, illegal trade has an even stronger impact, as pangolins are reported to be the most trafficked animal in the world (with elephants a close second). The scales alone account for 20% of the black market in protected animal parts; they are boiled off the body and used for traditional medicines. Pangolin meat is sold as a high-end delicacy in China and Vietnam, the blood is believed to be a healing tonic, and pangolin fetuses have alleged health benefits and aphrodisiac qualities. A conservative estimate of pangolins trafficked illegally each year is 10,000, while actual numbers for a two-year period may be in excess of 250,000. How many are left in the wild is unknown. Pangolins are generally poorly known to the public and their endangered status has so far received much less publicity than in the case of more iconic species.

== Phylogeny ==
Phylogenetic position of Smutsia temminckii within family Manidae based on Wangmo (2025) study:

- Manidae
  - Maninae
  - - Phatagininae
    - Smutsiinae
      - Smutsia
        - Smutsia gigantea
        - Smutsia temminckii

== See also ==
- Mammal classification
- Smutsia
