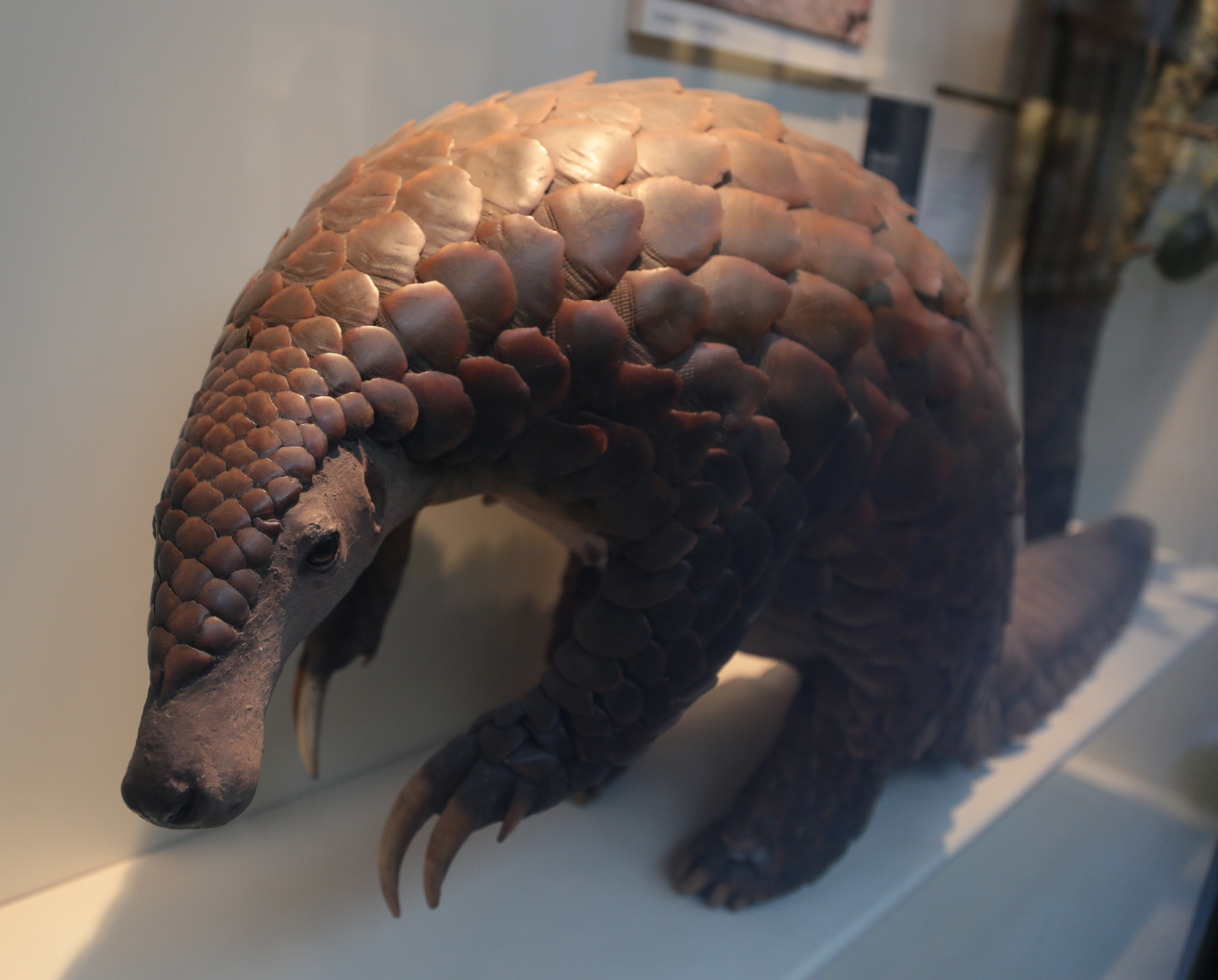
- Mounted specimen in the Natural History Museum, London
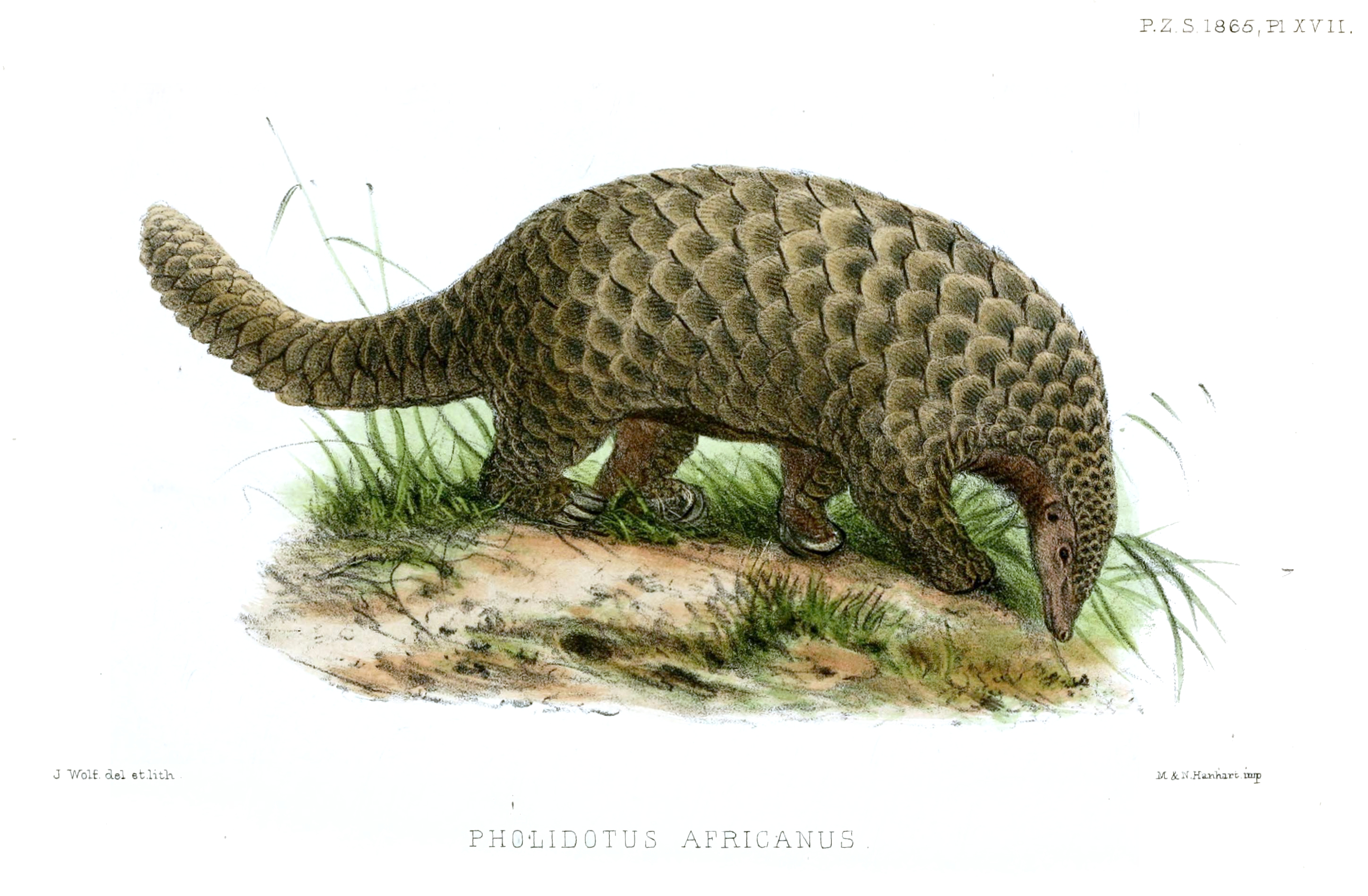
- Illustration by Joseph Wolf

Conservation status
- Endangered (IUCN 3.1)
- CITES Appendix I

Scientific classification
- Kingdom: Animalia
- Phylum: Chordata
- Class: Mammalia
- Infraclass: Placentalia
- Order: Pholidota
- Family: Manidae
- Genus: Smutsia
- Species: S. gigantea

Binomial name
- Smutsia gigantea Illiger, 1815
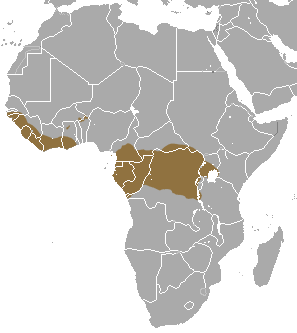
- range

Synonyms
- synonyms of species: Manis gigantea (Illiger, 1815); Manis wagneri (Fitzinger, 1872); Phataginus gigantea (Grubb, 1998); Pholidotus africanus (Gray, 1865)

= Giant pangolin =

Giant pangolin Temporal range: 5.0–0 Ma early Pliocene to present

Species of mammal

The giant pangolin (Smutsia gigantea) is a species of pangolin from genus Smutsia of subfamily Smutsiinae within the family Manidae. It is the largest living species of pangolins. Members of the species inhabit Africa with a range stretching along the equator from West Africa to Uganda. It subsists almost entirely on ants and termites.

== Description ==
The giant pangolin is the largest of all pangolin species. While its average mass has not been measured, one specimen was found to weigh between 30 kg (66 lb) and 40 kg (88 lb). Males are larger than females, with male body lengths about 137 cm (54 in) to 180 cm (71 in) and females about 112.5 cm (44.3 in) to 136.5 cm (53.7 in). Like all pangolins, the species is armored with large, brown to reddish-brown scales formed from keratin. Curiously, it also has eyelashes. The giant pangolin has a long snout, a long, thick tail, and large front claws.

The animal has a strong sense of smell and large anal glands. Its secretions may be significant to animal communication. The species walks with most of its weight on its columnar rear legs, and curls its front paws, walking on the outside of the wrists rather than the palms to protect the claws. Unlike its close relative, the ground pangolin, this pangolin does not walk upright as a biped.

== Distribution and habitat ==
The giant pangolin inhabits many countries, with the largest concentration in Uganda, Tanzania. It is found mainly in the savanna, rainforest, and forest, inhabiting areas with large termite populations and available water. It does not inhabit high-altitude areas. A small number of recorded sightings have occurred in western Kenya within the East African montane forests, the first being reported in 1971, with subsequent sightings being made in 2018. One of these sightings took place at 2,466 metres (8,091 ft) above sea level, the highest altitude the species has been recorded at.

== Behavior and ecology ==
The giant pangolin, like other pangolins, is nocturnal, which makes observation difficult. It is also usually solitary, although in one case an adult was seen in a burrow with a juvenile.

=== Diet ===
Like all pangolins, the giant pangolin is a specialized insectivore that lacks teeth and the ability to chew. Its diet mainly consists of ants and termites, which it finds by tearing open anthills and termite nests, both subterranean and mound-type.

Because of its relatively large size, the giant pangolin is particularly well-suited to breaking open termite mounds by leaning on the mound and resting its weight on its tail, and then ripping into the mound with its front claws. The combination of weight and physical damage quickly leads to a partial collapse of the mound, exposing the termites. Only the adults are strong enough to do this; their young must follow behind their mothers until they grow large enough to do it for themselves. It eats the insects by picking them up with its sticky tongue, which is up to 70 cm (28 in) long fully extended and can extend out of the mouth for more than 30 cm (12 in).

=== Reproduction ===
Very little information about the reproduction of the giant pangolin is known. Two birth records exist, with one litter in September and another in October, with the young weighing around 500 g (18 oz). As in all pangolins, infants have soft scales that eventually harden, and are born with open eyes. They cannot walk on their legs, but can move on their bellies. During age 6–8 weeks, the young often spew a yellow secretion from their anal glands (that is often said to smell of decay and cabbage) to keep predators and other animals from taking advantage of their mothers.

== Threats ==
The giant pangolin is threatened by habitat destruction and deforestation, and hunting for the bushmeat trade. Between 2011 and 2015, nine shipments with pangolin body parts were seized in Asia that originated in Nigeria. They contained 3,000 kg (6,600 lb) pangolin meat and close to 5,500 kg (12,100 lb) pangolin scales that were destined to China and Laos.

== Conservation ==
The giant pangolin has been listed on CITES Appendix I since January 2017.

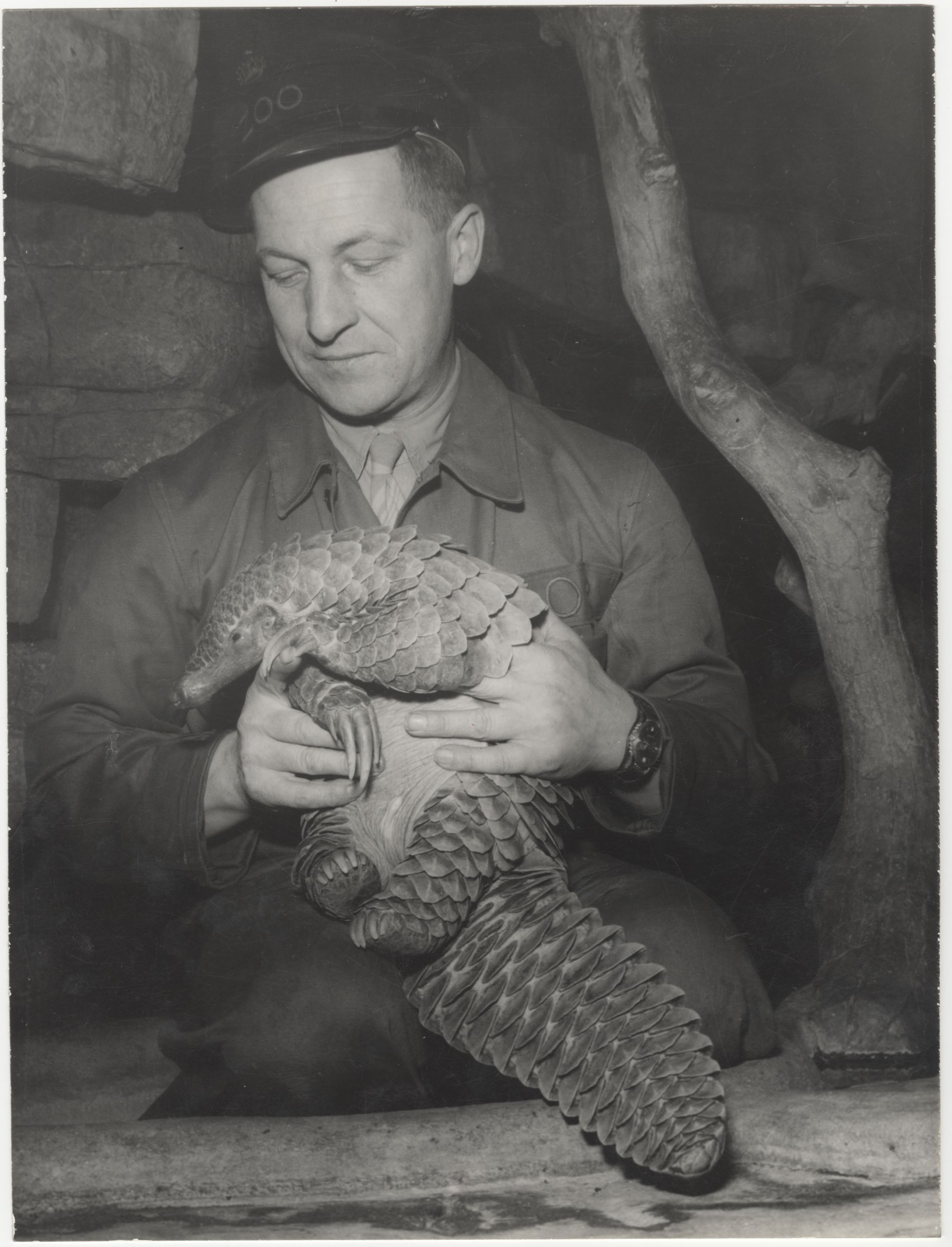
Giant pangolin in Antwerp Zoo - 1940, Touring Club Italiano

In 2023 a giant pangolin was spotted in Niokolo-Koba National Park in Senegal, where the species had not been seen since 1999 and was considered extinct in the area.

== Phylogeny ==
Phylogenetic position of Smutsia gigantea within family Manidae based on Wangmo (2025.) study:

- Manidae
  - Maninae
  - - Phatagininae
    - Smutsiinae
      - Smutsia
        - Smutsia temminckii
        - Smutsia gigantea

== See also ==
- Mammal classification
- Smutsia
