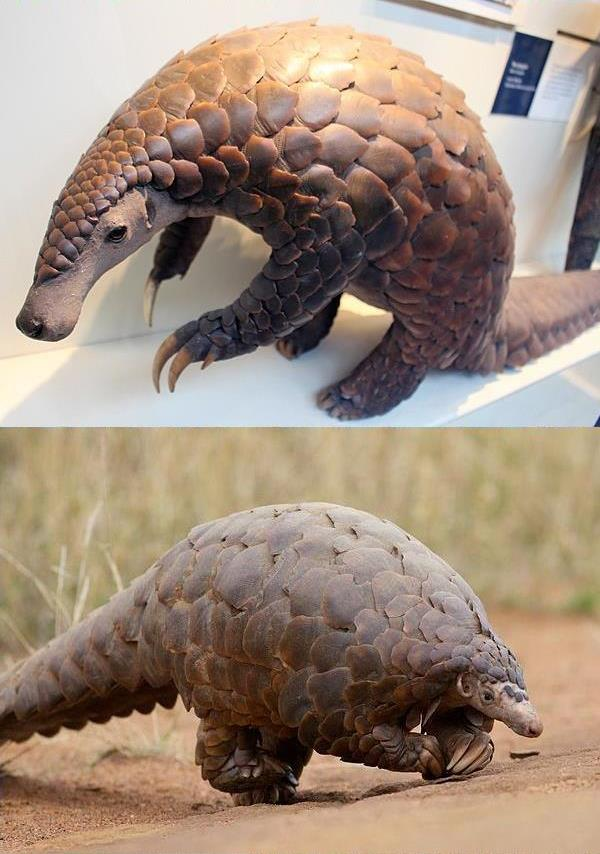
- Pangolins from genus Smutsia

Scientific classification
- Kingdom: Animalia
- Phylum: Chordata
- Class: Mammalia
- Order: Pholidota
- Suborder: Eupholidota
- Superfamily: Manoidea
- Family: Manidae
- Subfamily: Smutsiinae; Gray, 1873
- Genus: Smutsia; Gray, 1865

Type species
- Manis temminckii Smuts, 1832

Species
- S. gigantea (Illiger, 1815); S. temminckii (Smuts, 1832); †S. olteniensis (Terhune, 2021)
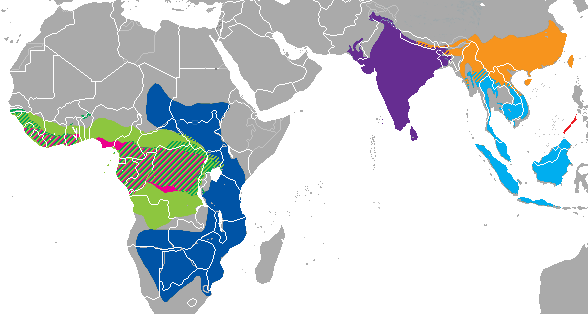
- Smutsia gigantea Smutsia temminckii

Synonyms
- synonyms of subfamily: Smutsiana (Gray, 1873); Smutsiini (Gray, 1873)

= Smutsia =

Smutsia Temporal range: 12.98–0 Ma Late Miocene - present

Genus of mammals

Smutsia ("Smuts's animal") or African ground pangolin is a genus of pangolins from subfamily Smutsiinae within family Manidae. It was formerly considered a subgenus of genus Manis. Its members are the more terrestrial of the African pangolins. In the past, this genus was also present in Europe.

== Etymology ==
British naturalist John Edward Gray named Smutsia for South African naturalist Johannes Smuts (1808–1869), the first South African to write a treatise on mammals in 1832 (in which he described the species Manis temminckii).

== Description ==
The Smutsia species can be easily distinguished due to a layer of protective horny scales covering their long streamlined bodies, small cone-shaped heads, and thick tails. Resembling artichoke leaves, the scales are composed of fused hairs. When threatened, members of the species roll into an impenetrable ball, leaving the sharp, yellow-brown scales exposed to the predator.

=== Diet and nutrition ===
Ground pangolins are carnivorous animals which mainly eat termites and ants, though larvae and other soft-bodied insects are also consumed on occasion.

=== Mating life ===
Ground pangolins reach sexual maturity at around 5–7 years of age. The species is described as polygynous: one male will mate with multiple females, but females tend to mate with only a single male. The gestation period lasts for 139 days, with each pregnancy yielding a single offspring. Mothers and their young shelter underground until the pups reach 2 to 4 weeks of age, at which stage they are carried outside the nest, though they remain with their mothers for 3 months.

== Taxonomy ==
- Subfamily: Smutsiinae (Gray, 1873) (large African pangolins)
  - Genus: Smutsia (Gray, 1865) (African ground pangolin)
    - Smutsia gigantea (Illiger, 1815) (giant pangolin)
    - Smutsia temminckii (Smuts, 1832) (ground pangolin)
    - †Smutsia olteniensis (Terhune, 2021) (Oltenian pangolin)

== Phylogeny ==
Phylogenetic position of genus Smutsia within family Manidae based on Wangmo (2025.) study:

- Manidae
  - Maninae
  - - Phatagininae
    - Smutsiinae
      - Smutsia
        - Smutsia gigantea
        - Smutsia temminckii

== See also ==
- Mammal classification
- Manidae
