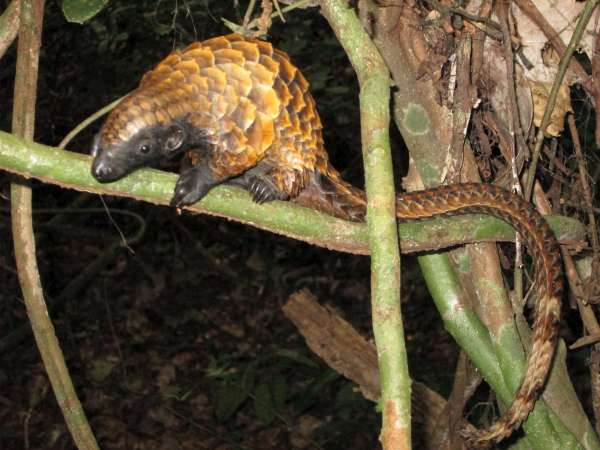
- Individual at Dzanga-Sangha Reserve in the Central African Republic

Conservation status
- Vulnerable (IUCN 3.1)
- CITES Appendix I

Scientific classification
- Kingdom: Animalia
- Phylum: Chordata
- Class: Mammalia
- Infraclass: Placentalia
- Order: Pholidota
- Family: Manidae
- Genus: Phataginus
- Species: P. tetradactyla

Binomial name
- Phataginus tetradactyla (Linnaeus, 1766)
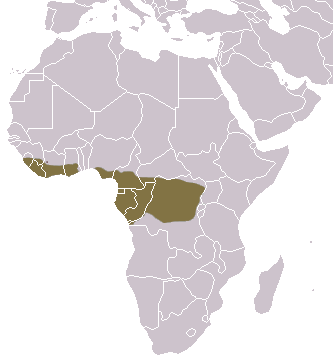
- Long-tailed pangolin range

Synonyms
- Manis tetradactyla Linnaeus, 1766; Uromanis tetradactyla (Linnaeus, 1766); Manis africana Desmarest, 1822; Manis ceonyx Rafinesque, 1820; Manis hessi Noack, 1889

= Long-tailed pangolin =

Long-tailed pangolin Temporal range: Early Pleistocene - present

Species of mammal

The long-tailed pangolin (Phataginus tetradactyla), also called the African black-bellied pangolin or ipi, is a diurnal, arboreal pangolin species belonging to the family Manidae, in the order Pholidota. They feed on ants rather than termites. The common names for this species stem from physical characteristics, such as the extremely long tail or the dark hairs that cover the underside of their bodies and limbs. Pangolin comes from the Malay word pengguling, meaning "something that rolls up".

== Description ==
Phataginus tetradactyla specimens

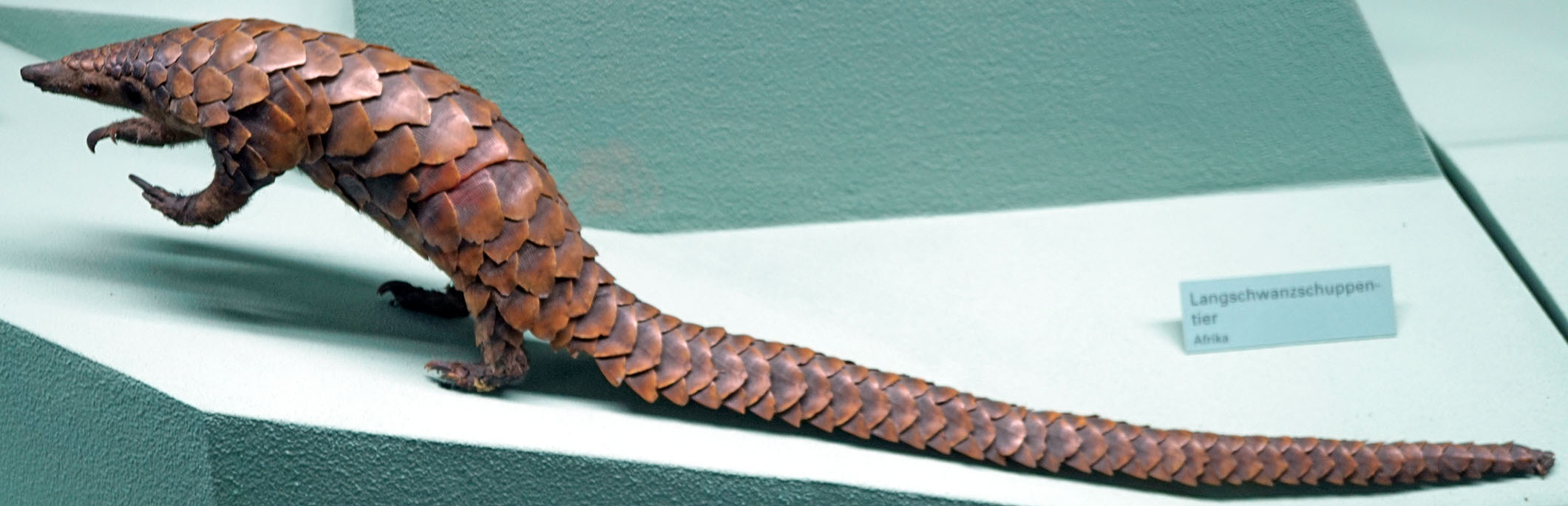
Specimen, showing long tail

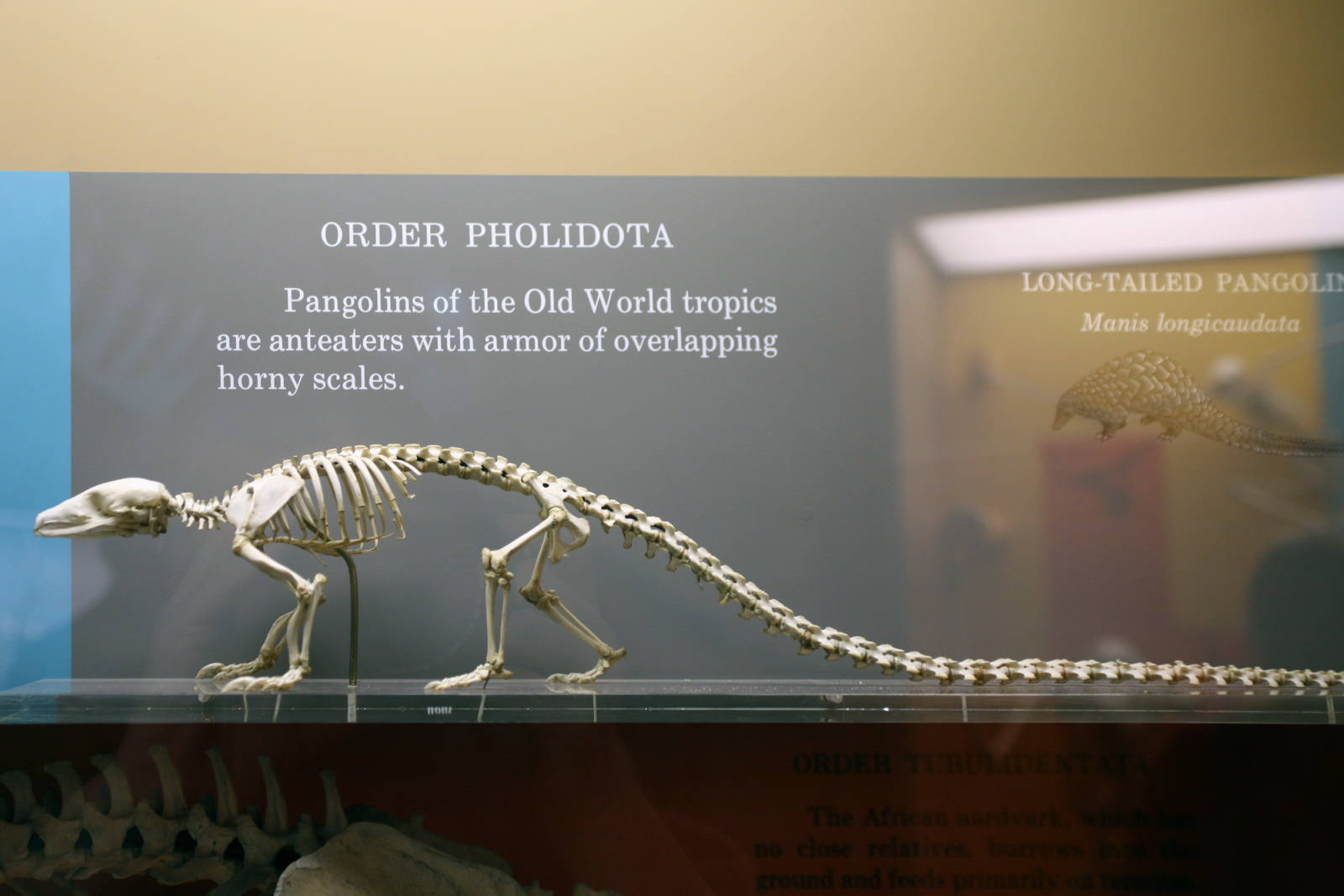
Skeleton at the Smithsonian Museum

Phataginus tetradactyla has a characteristic very long tail (hence its common name), reaching a length around 60–70 cm (24–28 in). The tail contains 49 caudal vertebrae, a record among mammals. The body can reach a length of 30–40 cm (12–16 in) and weigh 2.0–2.5 kg (4.4–5.5 lb). The males are larger than the females.

Even with the long tail, this species is the smallest of eight extant species of pangolins. As with other pangolins, the long-tailed pangolin is covered with 9 to 13 rows of overlapping, artichoke leaf-shaped keratinous scales. The scales are dark brown color with a brighter rim, which serves as camouflage. The feet have large, curved claws. The tip of the tail is bare and contains a sensory pad that allows the individual to seek out and grip branches. They do not have teeth, while the tongue is very long. The abdomen, underside of the limbs, and face are covered in dark fur instead of scales.

The long-tailed pangolin is the only diurnal pangolin species.

== Distribution and habitat ==
Native to parts of western and central Africa, the long tailed-pangolin has been found as far west and north as Senegal, across the continent to Uganda, and south into Angola. They are found in areas such as the Congo Basin and Guinean forests. A distinct gap in populations has been observed starting in southwest Ghana, with no record of individuals found through to western Nigeria.

Long-tailed pangolins are found in moist, tropical riverine and swamp forest environments, but have been observed in altered forests (Bush), and agricultural areas of former lowland rain forests. They are almost exclusively arboreal, spending the majority of their time in the canopy region. They prefer to live in the interior part of the forests, avoiding the outermost edges. They are capable swimmers, and are usually found near water.

== Life history ==
=== Behavior ===
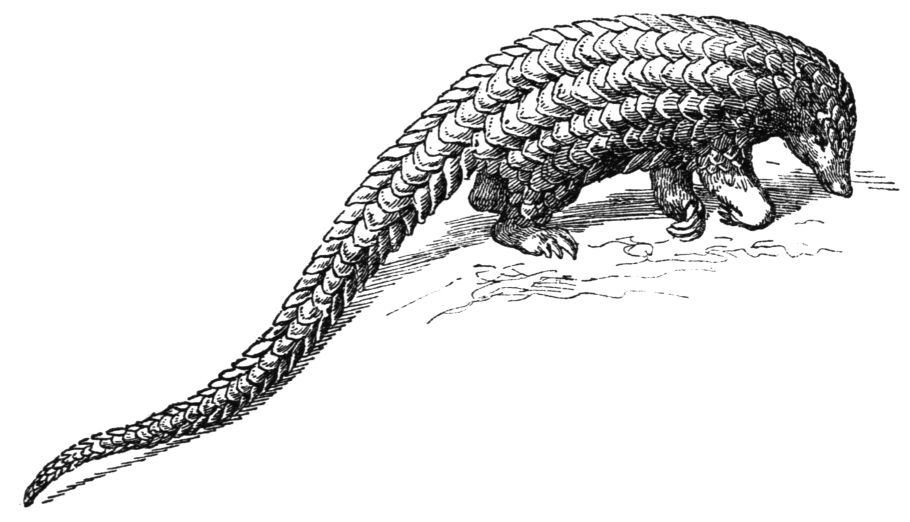

Long-tailed pangolins are a solitary, shy species. They communicate with other members of their species using pheromones that are produced in a pair of anal scent glands. The pheromones in the exudate are likely used to attract mates and establish territorial edges. They are the only species of pangolin known to be diurnal, which may be a method of avoiding food competition with its sister species, the tree pangolin (Manis tricuspis). They have developed a number of antipredatory mechanisms to protect themselves from predators such as pythons and leopards, starting with their scales, which act as camouflage. When threatened, long-tailed pangolin roll themselves into a tight ball, exposing only their sharp scales. They may also emit a foul-smelling fluid from their anal glands. They have been observed sleeping (at night) in this rolled-up posture in tree hollows, epiphytes, tree ferns or in old ant nests.

The primarily arboreal lifestyle of the long-tailed pangolin has come with the development of a number of climbing adaptations. Their long, prehensile tails can easily support their body weight, and are commonly used to seek out supportive holds. Occasionally, they dangle just by their tails. Their durable claws also allow them to dig into the bark of the trees and pull themselves up into the canopy. When they are unable to reach another branch, they have been known to extend their tails to the next hold and climb up it.

While the species spends most of its life in the canopy, it is also an apt swimmer. They occasionally drop from overhanging branches into streams below. They move through the water with a quick, undulating movement.

=== Diet ===
The long-tailed pangolin is myrmecophagous, primarily feeding on ants. They are the only known species of pangolin known not to depend on termites as a large portion of their diet. Using their well-developed sense of smell, they seek out arboreal ant nests, then tear them open with their strong, curved claws. They use their long, sticky tongues to capture escaping ants, pulling them into their mouths and swallowing them whole. Since they lack teeth to physically chew the food, they possess a muscular, gizzard-like stomach with horny coated walls to grind the food. The acanthocephalan Intraproboscis sanghae parasitizes the pangolin by using their proboscis hooks to pierce and hold the wall of the intestines.

=== Reproduction ===
Little is currently known about long-tailed pangolin reproduction. They are thought to mate throughout the year, with an average gestation period of roughly 140 days. Female pangolins give birth to a live, single offspring at a time. The young are born with soft scales that harden within a few days. They ride on their mother's tail for up to three months after birth. Long-tailed pangolin reach sexual maturity around two years of age.

== Conservation ==
The long-tailed pangolin is classified as vulnerable by the IUCN. Like most pangolins, the species is heavily exploited for the bushmeat and traditional medicine trade. It is relatively tolerant of moderate habitat modification, as seen in populations that have found homes in agricultural areas of former lowland rainforests.
