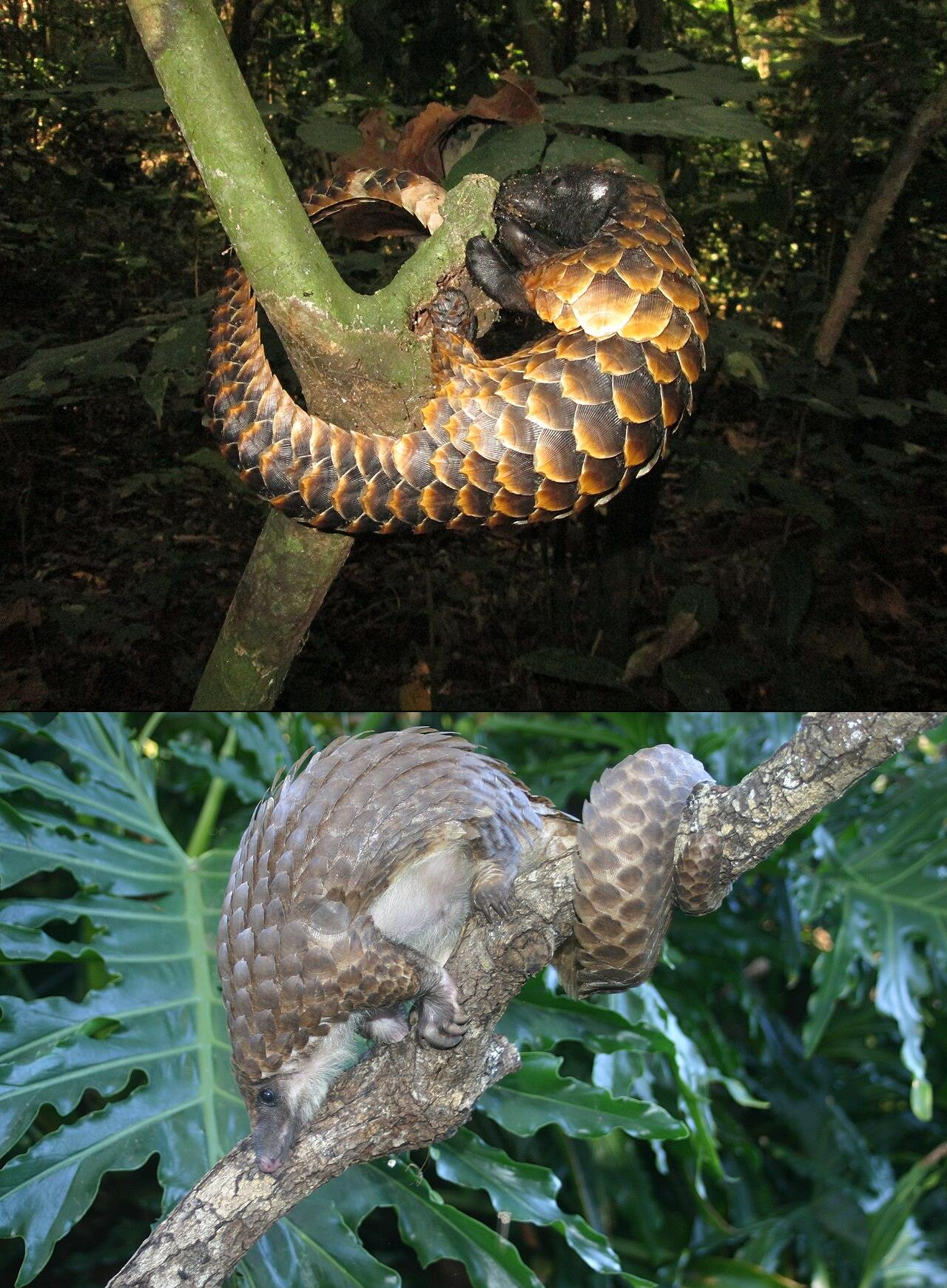
- Pangolins from genus Phataginus

Scientific classification
- Kingdom: Animalia
- Phylum: Chordata
- Class: Mammalia
- Order: Pholidota
- Suborder: Eupholidota
- Superfamily: Manoidea
- Family: Manidae
- Subfamily: Phatagininae; Gaubert, 2017
- Genus: Phataginus; Rafinesque, 1821

Type species
- Phataginus tricuspis Rafinesque, 1821

Species
- Phataginus tetradactyla; Phataginus tricuspis
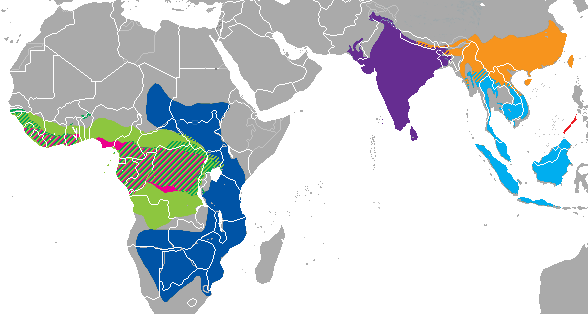
- Phataginus tetradactyla Phataginus tricuspis

Synonyms
- synonyms of subfamily: Uromaninae (Pocock, 1924); Uromanini (Pocock, 1924); synonyms of genus: Pangolinus (Rafinesque, 1821); Paramanis (Pocock, 1924); Phatages (Sundevall, 1843); Phatagin (Gray, 1865); Phataginus (Rafinesque, 1815) [nomen nudum]; Triglochinopholis (Fitzinger, 1872); Uromanis (Pocock, 1924)

= Phataginus =

African tree pangolin Temporal range: 16.58–0 Ma middle Miocene - Present

Genus of mammals

African tree pangolin (Phataginus) is a genus of African pangolins from subfamily Phatagininae, within family Manidae. Its members are the more arboreal of the African pangolins.

From 2010 to 2019, at least 895,000 pangolins from the genus Phataginus were illegally trafficked. The animal is hunted and poached for its scales and meat, and is often used in making traditional medicine in places such as China and Vietnam. Attempts to protect these mammals from trafficking and extinction are ongoing; unfortunately their slow reproduction rate stymies population recovery. Currently the tree pangolin is listed as endangered. All pangolin species have been listed as vulnerable, endangered, or critically endangered.

== Etymology ==
Constantine Rafinesque (1821) formed the Neo-Latin generic name Phataginus from the French term phatagin, adopted by Count Buffon (1763) after the reported local name phatagin or phatagen used in the East Indies.

== Taxonomy ==
- Subfamily: Phatagininae (small African pangolins)
  - Genus: Phataginus (African tree pangolin)
    - Phataginus tetradactyla (black-bellied pangolin)
    - Phataginus tricuspis (white-bellied pangolin)

== Phylogeny ==
Phylogenetic position of genus Phataginus within family Manidae based on Wangmo (2025.) study:

- Manidae
  - Maninae
  - - Smutsiinae
    - Phatagininae
      - Phataginus
        - Phataginus tetradactyla
        - Phataginus tricuspis
