= Rhinarium =

Surface around the nostrils in some mammals

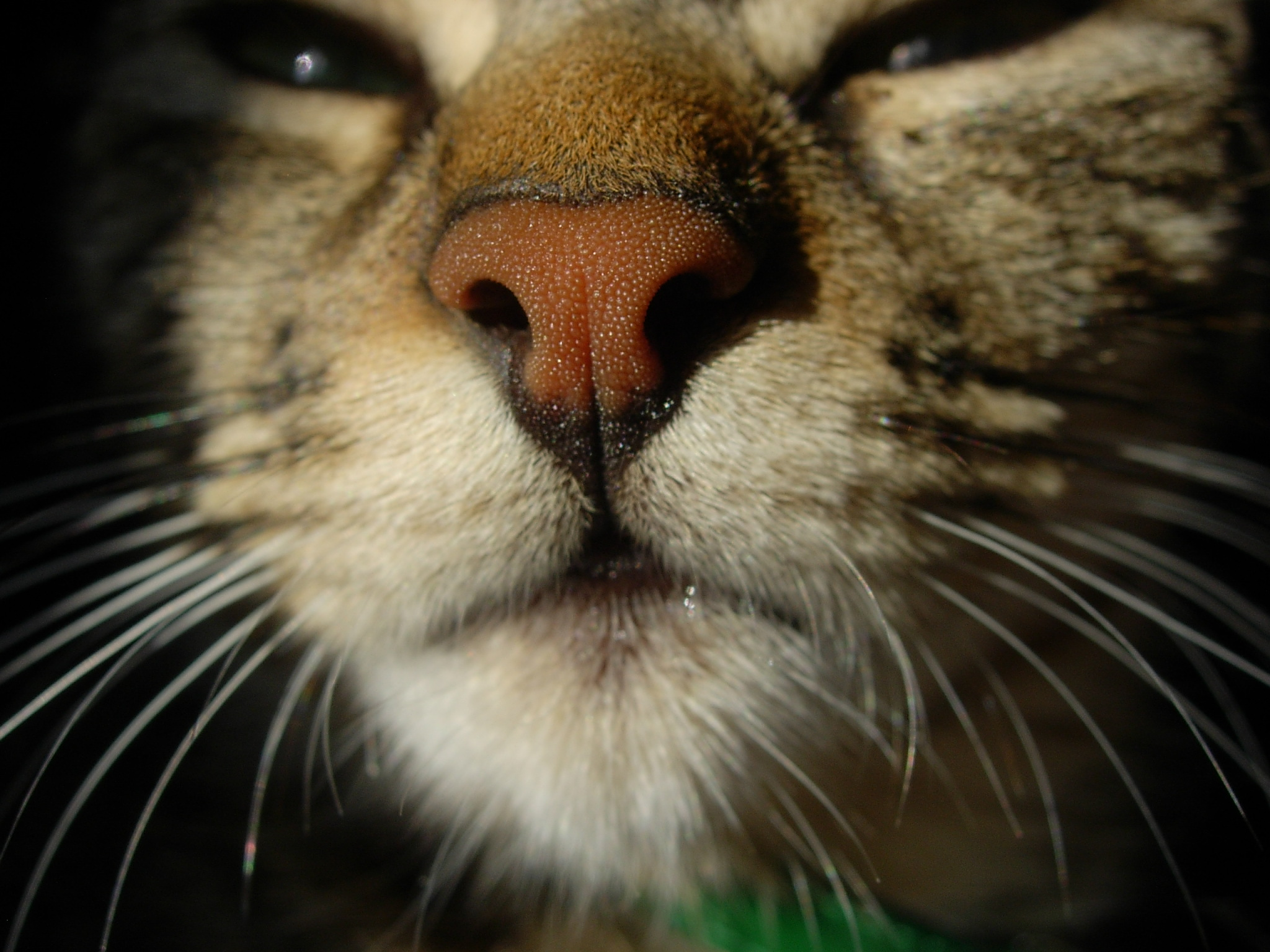
The rhinarium of a cat.

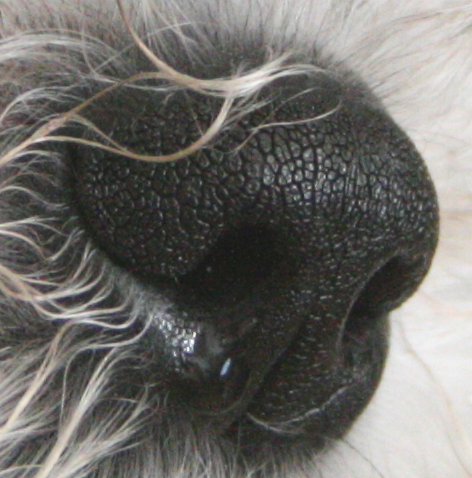
A dog's rhinarium with philtrum and conspicuous crenellations

The rhinarium (Neo-Latin, "belonging to the nose"; pl.: rhinaria) is the furless skin surface surrounding the external openings of the nostrils in many mammals. Commonly it is referred to as the tip of the snout, and breeders of cats and dogs sometimes use the term nose leather. Informally, it may be called a "truffle", "wet snout," or "wet nose” because its surface is moist in some species: for example, healthy dogs and cats.

In many species, the rhinarium has a mid-line groove (cleft) – the philtrum – and a wrinkled (crenellated) surface. The rhinarium is a separate sense organ: it is a touch-based chemosensory organ that connects with a well-developed vomeronasal organ (VNO). The rhinarium is used to touch a scent-marked object containing pheromones (usually large, non-volatile molecules), and transfer these pheromone molecules down the philtrum to the VNO via the nasopalatine ducts that travel through the incisive foramen of the hard palate. It also acts as a wind-direction detector: cold receptors in the skin of the rhinarium detect the orientation where evaporative cooling is highest, as determined by the wind direction.

The study of the rhinarium's structure and associated functions has proven of considerable importance in the fields of mammalian evolution and taxonomy. For example, primates are phylogenetically divided into those, such as lemurs, with the primitive rhinarium (Strepsirrhini) and the dry-nosed primates (Haplorhini, including apes and thus humans).

In an analogous way – entirely unrelated to vertebrate morphology – the term rhinarium is sometimes applied to chemosensory structures in invertebrates. For example, microscopic sensilla in the form of flattened sense organs on the antennae of aphids are referred to as rhinaria.

== Morphology ==
=== Derivation ===
Morphologically, the rhinarium belongs to the olfactory system, but which part of the system it derives from is open to debate. One possibility is the main olfactory system, which captures media-borne odors; another is the "second nose," the accessory olfactory system, which samples chemicals dissolved in fluids. Arguments supporting the former position consider the rhinarium "an outward extension of the olfactory ... skin that covers the nasal passages, [which] contains nerve receptors for smell and touch." If that interpretation is correct, and the rhinarium is an extension of the olfactory epithelium lining the nasal passages, then it derives from the main system.

But one opposing view traces a path from the philtrum over a notch in the upper lip, through a gap between the first incisors and premaxillae, along a "midline palatal groove" to "a canal that connects with the duct of the vomeronasal organ," suggesting that the rhinarium belongs to the accessory system. It is unclear if moisture (mucus) there functions to trap odiferous molecules — or is the remnant of a fluid transmission system for pheromonal molecules.

=== Crenellations ===
Typically, the rhinarium is crenellated (wrinkled, crackled, or embossed), which may increase its sensory area, but there are many exceptions and variations among different mammalian taxa, and also variations in the innervation and sensilla of the rhinarium, so such generalized speculation should be treated with caution regarding this matter.

== Function ==
Mammals with rhinaria tend to have a more acute sense of smell, and the loss of the rhinarium in the haplorrhine primates is related to their decreased reliance on olfaction, being associated with other derived characteristics such as a reduced number of turbinates. The rhinarium is also very useful to animals with good sense of smell because of its role as a wind-direction detector. The cold receptors in the skin respond to the place where evaporation is the highest. Thus the detection of a particular smell is associated with the direction it comes from.

The rhinarium is adapted for different purposes in different mammals, according to ecological niche. In aquatic mammals, the development of lobes beside the nostrils allows them to close for diving. In mammals that dig or root with their noses, the rhinarium often develops into a resilient pad, with the nostrils off to the side (or below) and capable of closing to keep out dust. Examples include the common wombat, marsupial mole, and members of the Chrysochloridae. In elephants, the rhinarium has become a tactile organ. And in the walrus, a covering of stiff bristles protects it while the animal forages for shellfish. In many animals, the form and purpose of the rhinarium remains unclear.

Evolutionary pressures also are not always unequivocally distinguishable, and there have been upheavals in late 20th and early 21st century taxonomy. For example, the lack of an obvious rhinarium in Tarsiiformes has been interpreted by some scholars as the consequence of the enormous development of the eyeballs, rather than a loss of relevance of olfaction, but the significance is currently debatable, because there currently is an influential body of opinion favouring inclusion of the tarsiers in the Haplorhini rather than in the Strepsirrhini as had been traditional.

== Phylogeny ==
=== Mammalian ===
The rhinarium is a general mammalian feature and therefore likely to have been present in the stem mammals.

=== Primate ===
Primates are phylogenetically divided into those with a rhinarium, the Strepsirrhini (the prosimians: the lorises, and the lemurs); and those without a rhinarium, the Haplorhini, (the Simians: monkeys, apes, and humans). In place of the rhinarium, Haplorhini have a more mobile, continuous, dry upper lip.

== Use of term in invertebrates ==
In an analogous usage unrelated to vertebrate morphology, the term rhinarium is sometimes applied to chemosensory structures in invertebrates. For example, microscopic sensilla in the flattened sense organs on the antennae of aphids are referred to as rhinaria.

== See also ==
- Nose
- Snout

== Bibliography ==
- Fleagle, J. G. (1988). Primate adaptation and evolution. San Diego: Academic Press.
