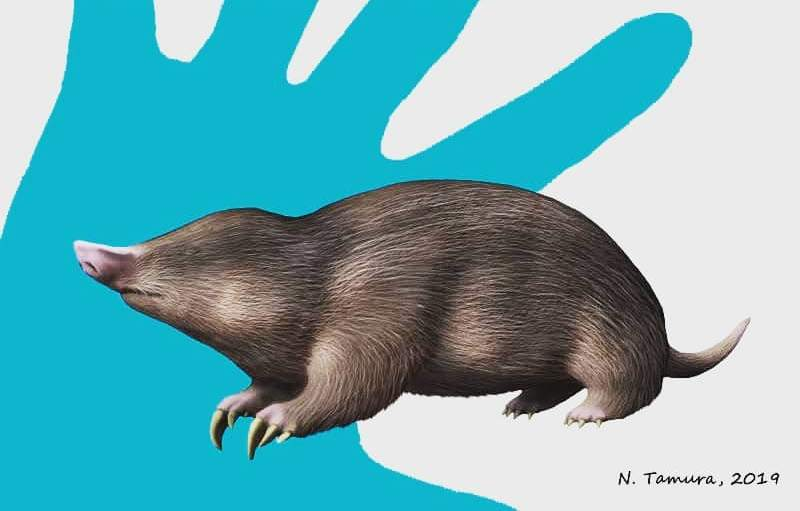
- Artist reconstruction of Xenocranium pileorivale compared to the size of a human hand.
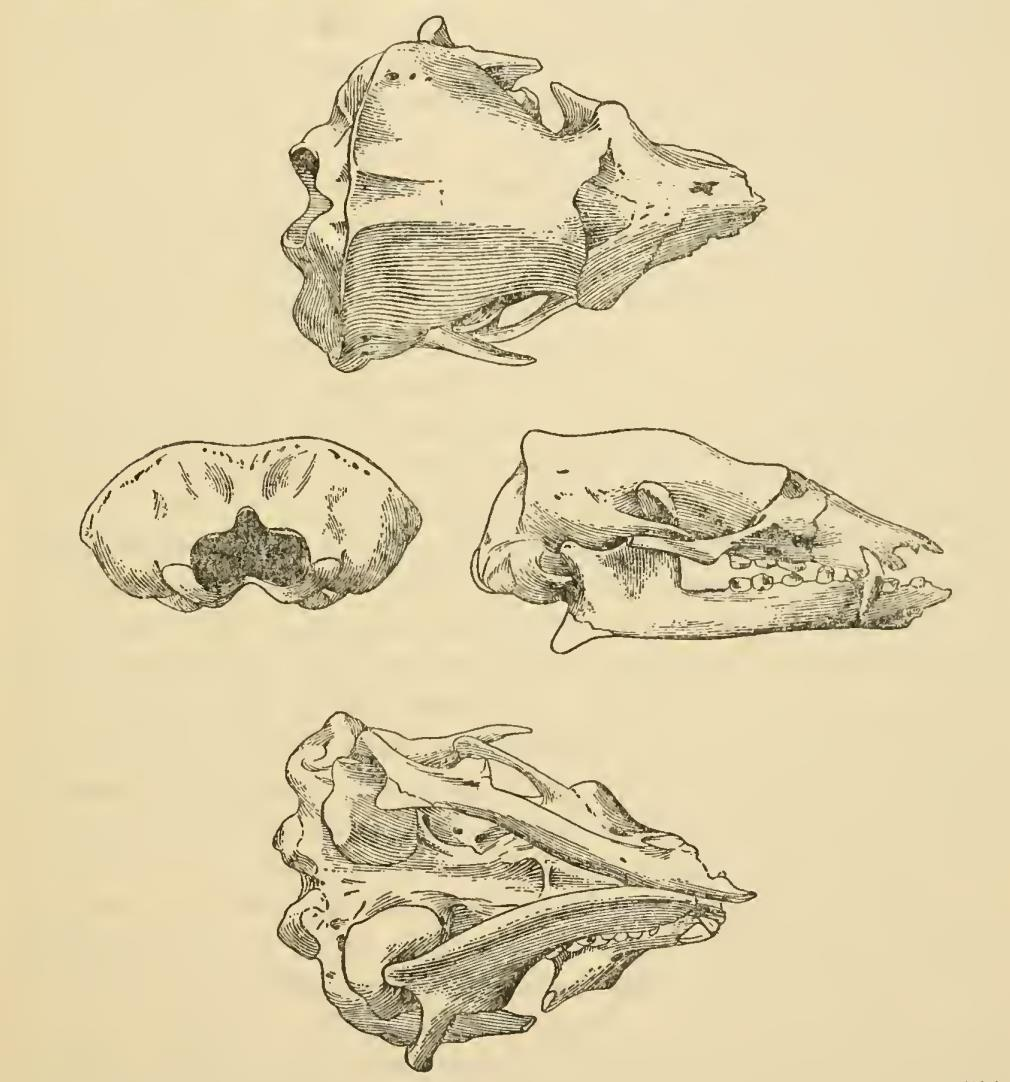
- skull of Pentapassalus pearcei

Scientific classification
- Kingdom: Animalia
- Phylum: Chordata
- Class: Mammalia
- Order: †Palaeanodonta
- Family: †Epoicotheriidae
- Subfamily: †Epoicotheriinae; Simpson, 1927

Type genus
- †Epoicotherium Simpson, 1927

Genera
- [see classification]

= Epoicotheriinae =

Epoicotheriinae Temporal range: 53.0–30.9 Ma early Eocene - early Oligocene

Extinct subfamily of mammals

Epoicotheriinae ("strange beasts") is an extinct paraphyletic subfamily of insectivorous placental mammals within extinct paraphyletic family Epoicotheriidae in extinct order Palaeanodonta, that lived in North America and Europe from the early Eocene to early Oligocene. Epoicotheriins were fossorial mammals. Late Eocene/early Oligocene genera were highly specialized animals that were convergent with the talpids, golden moles and marsupial mole in the structure of their skulls and forelimbs, and would have had a similar lifestyle as subterranean burrowers.

== Classification and phylogeny ==
=== Classification ===
- Subfamily: †Epoicotheriinae ^{(paraphyletic subfamily)} (Simpson, 1927)
  - Genus: †Pentapassalus (Gazin, 1952)
    - †Pentapassalus pearcei (Gazin, 1952)
    - †Pentapassalus woodi (Guthrie, 1967)
  - Genus: †Tetrapassalus (Simpson, 1959)
    - †Tetrapassalus mckennai (Simpson, 1959)
    - †Tetrapassalus proius (West, 1973)
    - †Tetrapassalus sp. A [AMNH 10215] (Rose, 1978)
    - †Tetrapassalus sp. B (Robinson, 1963)
  - (unranked): †Epoicotherium/Xenocranium clade
    - Genus: †Epoicotherium (Simpson, 1927)
      - †Epoicotherium unicum (Douglass, 1905)
    - Genus: †Molaetherium (Storch & Rummel, 1999)
      - †Molaetherium heissigi (Storch & Rummel, 1999)
    - Genus: †Xenocranium (Colbert, 1942)
      - †Xenocranium pileorivale (Colbert, 1942)

== See also ==
- Mammal classification
- Epoicotheriidae
