= Northern marsupial mole =

Conservation status
- Least Concern (IUCN 3.1)

Scientific classification
- Kingdom: Animalia
- Phylum: Chordata
- Class: Mammalia
- Infraclass: Marsupialia
- Order: Notoryctemorphia
- Family: Notoryctidae
- Genus: Notoryctes
- Species: N. caurinus

Binomial name
- Notoryctes caurinus Thomas, 1920
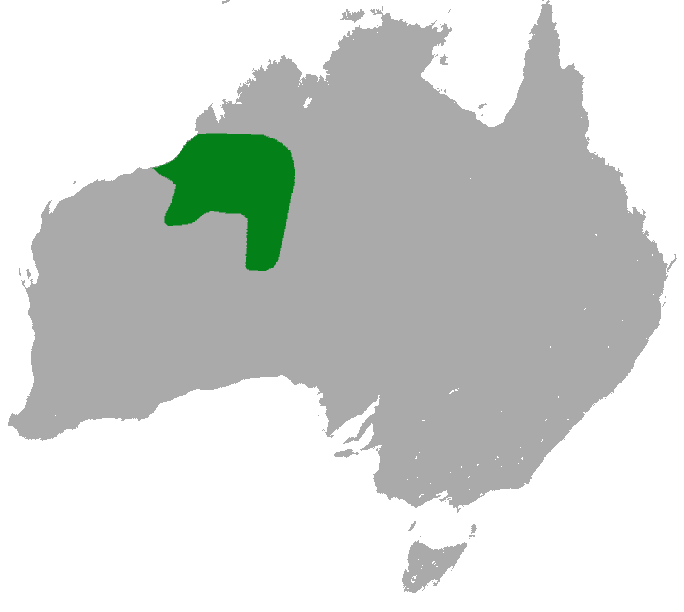
- Distribution range of northwest species N. caurinus

Species of marsupial

The northern marsupial mole or kakarratul (Notoryctes caurinus) is a marsupial in the family Notoryctidae, an endemic animal of arid regions of Central Australia. It lives in the loose sand of dunes and river plains in the desert, spending nearly its entire life beneath ground. The facial features are reduced or absent; their small and strong bodies, weighing little more than 30 grams (1 ounce), are extremely specialised in moving through sand in search of prey. The species is elusive and it is one of the most poorly understood mammals of Australia.

== Taxonomy ==
A description of the species was published by Oldfield Thomas in 1920. One of two extant species of the genus Notoryctes, following recognition of its separation from Notoryctes typhlops in 1988. The specimen described by Thomas was collected in 1910 by a postal official at Wollal, at Ninety Mile Beach in north-western Australia, and this was conveyed to the Western Australian Museum. Thomas distinguished the new species from the southern N. typhlops, described in 1891 by E. C. Stirling, as smaller, particularly its claws and muzzle/nose, but with larger auditory bulla. He also described them as differing in dentition to the southern species, especially in their lower jaw.

The northern marsupial mole is also called the northwestern marsupial mole. Described as 'unimaginative', these common names were replaced with that derived from indigenous languages of the region in 1996, which has been widely accepted since.

== Description ==
The kakarratul and the itjaritjari, species Notoryctes typhlops, are superficially indistinguishable and unmistakable for any other animal. The dense pelage is short, smooth and finely haired, and is a uniform and pale yellow-pink colour. The length of the head and body combined is 120–160 mm (4.7–6.3 in), and the length of the stubby, leathery tail is 20–25 mm (0.79–0.98 in). The weight range is 40–70 g (1.4–2.5 oz). The vestigial eyes are a non-functioning subcutaneous lens, and a leathery covering at the pointed snout protects the nostrils. No external ear is present, and the opening for the reduced structure is covered in a dense layer of hairs. A fossorial animal, the highly specialised form of the body is tubular, its head narrowing in view to a conical shape and the limbs are short and well suited to digging. The two claws of the third and fourth front toe are enlarged and able to shovel the sand ahead of themselves. A pouch used in rearing young, a feature common to marsupials and as is usual for subterranean species, faces away from the direction of travel to avoid sand entering it.

The anatomy of N. caurinus has been examined with CT scans, showing the skeletal tomography, and MRI that give some details of soft tissue structures, the 2003 study being the first since the details given by Thomas in 1920. The vertebrae at the hind part of kakarratul are completely fused, a unique characteristic amongst the marsupials, and the spinal column is greatly strengthened; the side view of the spine shows a flattened profile that is also advantageous to its fossorial habits. Results of soft tissue examination showed large amounts of subcutaneous fat at the shoulders and pelvic regions. In an example of convergent evolution, the unusual metabolism of the species was compared to the physiology of a placental mammal of a golden mole found in Africa, similar in form and ecological factors, the subspecies Eremitalpa granti namibensis.

== Distribution and habitat ==
The species is distributed over an area of northwest Australia, at aeolian dunes and other soft sand terrain of the Australian interior. The records include the Little Sandy and Great Sandy Deserts, and at northern areas of the Gibson Desert (Western Australia), and possibly the Tanami Desert (Western Australia/western Northern Territory. The kakarratul is not able to easily traverse hardened sands or other terrain. It is thought both of these notoryctid species, the kakarratul and itjaritjari, may be sympatric where their distribution range overlaps in the south and east. The population structure within the range is poorly examined. There are around three hundred specimens available in collections of museums and elsewhere, although information on the range is limited to the two thirds with details of the collection site.

The habitat is at the series of sand dunes arising from the adjacent sandy plains, the populations seem to be restricted to these formations; they are noted as absent when dunes are poorly connected or become isolated. The vegetation is typical of the central regions, acacia and other hardy shrubs or small trees, and this species is also often associated with habitat around Triodia (spinifex) hummocks.

== Ecology ==
Very little is known of the habits of two species of Notoryctes, they are presumed to live a solitary existence. It is thought that they only emerge from the sand in wet weather. When moving on the surface of the ground, their motion is sinewy and the belly leaves a slightly winding trail; the marks of the appendages leave light impressions on the sand at the side of this furrow and appear more reptilian than mammalian. They enter the sandy soil at a shallow depth, but may tunnel deeply. A specimen was lost immediately after being placed on the ground, despite several people digging over the area to recover the animal.

Their natural habitat is the hot and arid north-western deserts of country. The diet consists of insect pupae and larvae. The species eats the larvae and pupae of ants, beetles and other insects. It catches and eats them underground and therefore rarely comes to the surface. It is commonly preyed upon by the introduced red fox and feral cats, and remains have been found in the scats of the dingo as well as some birds of prey, snakes and goannas. Large numbers of specimens were collected in the early twentieth century, and informal reports of a fur trade using the pelt of the animal are noted.

The effect on the ecology is largely unknown, but it is presumed to affect the populations of the small invertebrates in its diet. The impact of the subterranean activity on soil turnover is also presumed to be significant, the species does not build burrows as the soil it lives in is too soft and they instead 'swim' in the soil in a reptilian fashion. The tunnelling of the species while foraging causes the sand to shift as it falls behind them, the course of these has been measured at sites as moving in a criss-cross path of 30 to 60 kilometres per hectare that displaces 40 to 80 m^{3} of sand.

As no member of this species has been successfully held in captivity for an extended period of time, very little is known about the breeding and reproduction habits of the N. caurinus. However they have been recorded as having one or two offspring at a time. An early attempt to maintain a live specimen had it placed in a container of sand and fed on pieces of bread, but this died within a day. The behaviour and whereabouts of both species of Notoryctes were well known to the inhabitants who lived in the same regions, often incorporated into myth and referred to by a variety of names. Since the earliest published description, local peoples have provided information and have been involved in their collection for curious visitors.

The genus Notoryctes closely resembles a placental mammal found in Africa, known as the golden mole, and this is thought to be an example of convergent, rather than parallel, evolution. The features and tubular form of the body somewhat resemble the family Talpidae, referred to as moles, an animal that excavates tunnels rather than swimming through sand.

== Conservation ==
The IUCN redlist notes this species as Least Concern, the population evaluated as being widespread and assumed to be stable. The conservation status in Western Australia is near threatened, and noted in the sensitive species list as rare (P4).
