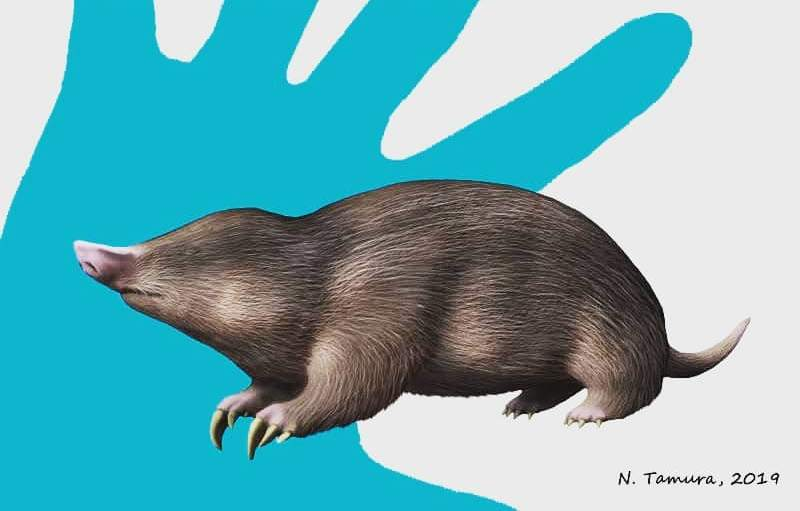
- Artist reconstruction of Xenocranium pileorivale compared to the size of a human hand.

Scientific classification
- Kingdom: Animalia
- Phylum: Chordata
- Class: Mammalia
- Infraclass: Placentalia
- Order: †Palaeanodonta
- Family: †Epoicotheriidae
- Subfamily: †Epoicotheriinae
- Genus: †Xenocranium; Colbert, 1942

Type species
- †Xenocranium pileorivale Colbert, 1942

= Xenocranium =

Xenocranium Temporal range: 35.8–33.9 Ma Late Eocene

Genus of prehistoric burrowing mammals

Xenocranium ("strange skull") is an extinct monotypic genus of placental mammal from extinct paraphyletic subfamily Epoicotheriinae within extinct paraphyletic family Epoicotheriidae in extinct order Palaeanodonta, that lived in North America during the late Eocene.

== Etymology ==
The name of genus Xenocranium comes from Ancient Greek ξένος (xénos) 'strange' and from Ancient Greek κρανίον (krāníon) 'skull', respectively after its unique skull arrangement.

The specific epithet is derived from Latin pileus 'hat' and from Latin rivalis 'brook', in reference to the nearby township of Hat Creek, Wyoming, U.S.A.

== Description ==
Xenocranium pileorivale was a highly specialized animal that was convergent with the talpids, golden moles and marsupial mole. It possesses many traits indicative of the lifestyle of a subterranean burrower, including small eyes, an upturned snout, muscular arms with large attachment points for the triceps, teres major, and carpal and digital flexor muscles. The dental formula is 0.1.41.1.5.

== Palaeoecology ==
The holotype of Xenocranium pileorivale was recovered from the Brule Formation, 160 feet below the top of the Oligocene outcrop in the area, which correlates with the Chadronian age to the Orellan age under the NALMA classification. Later on, this layer was found to be from Priabonian age of late Eocene. Further remains have been found in the White River Formation of Nebraska. The animals from these formations constitute the White River Fauna, which included predators like Hyaenodon and Dinictis, mixed feeders like Archaeotherium, and a large diversity of herbivorous mammals, such as the archaic horse Mesohippus, the cursorial rhinoceros Hyracodon, the brontothere Megacerops, and the very common "oreodont" Merycoidodon.

== See also ==
- Mammal classification
- Epoicotheriinae
