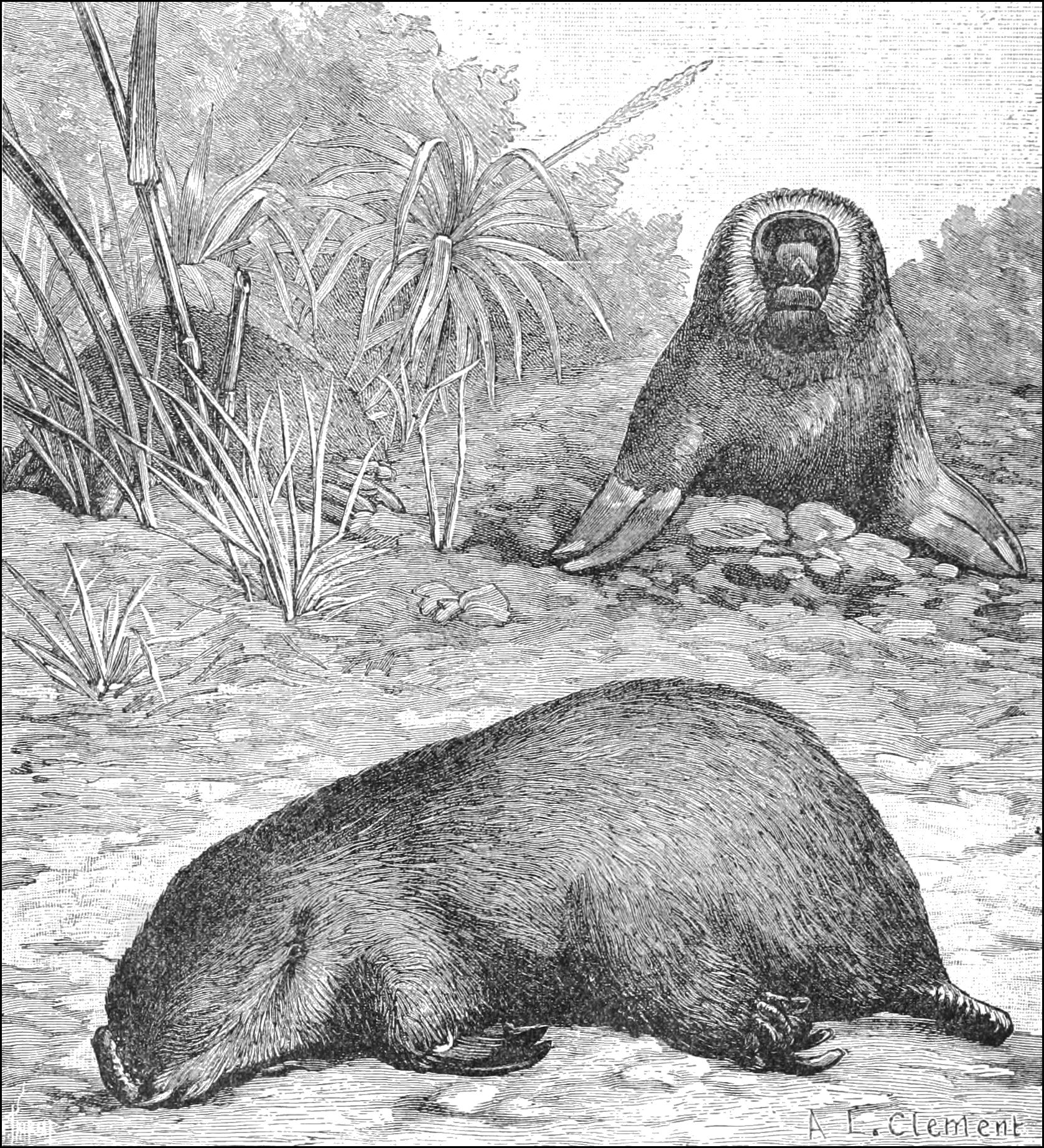
- Notoryctes typhlops

Scientific classification
- Kingdom: Animalia
- Phylum: Chordata
- Class: Mammalia
- Infraclass: Marsupialia
- Clade: Agreodontia
- Order: Notoryctemorphia; Kirsch in Hunsaker, 1977
- Family: Notoryctidae; Ogilby, 1892

Genera
- Notoryctes Stirling, 1891; †Naraboryctes Archer et al., 2010

= Notoryctidae =

Notoryctidae Temporal range: Oligocene - Recent

Family of marsupials

Notoryctidae (/noʊtəˈrɪktɪdiː/; from Ancient Greek νότος (nótos), meaning "south", and ὀρυκτήρ (oruktḗs), meaning "digger") are a family of marsupials comprising the marsupial moles and their fossil relatives. It is the only family in the order Notoryctemorphia.

== Taxonomy ==
A fossil species in a new genus was published as Naraboryctes. A new diagnosis for Notoryctidae was also provided in the species first description, as a consequence of the discovery of a fossil species in the family.

== Description ==
The group appear to have diverged from other marsupials at an early stage and are highly specialised to foraging through loose sand; the unusual features have seen the unique family placed in the taxonomic order Notoryctemorphia Aplin & Archer, 1987. The eyes and external ears are absent in the modern species, the nose is shielded and mouth reduced in size, and they use pairs of well developed claws to move beneath the sand. The Australian animals resemble species known as moles, burrow building mammals found in other continents, and were collectively referred to as 'marsupial moles'. The regional names for the well known animals, established before their published descriptions, are used to refer to the species.

The extant notoryctid species are subterranean, and are extremely well adapted to moving through sand plains and dunes, these are the two species of genus Notoryctes Stirling, 1891. The animals are known as itjaritjari (for the species N. typhlops) and kakarratul (for the species N. caurinus).

The dental formula is I1-5/1-3, C1/1, P1-3/1-3, M1-4/1-4.
