= Retronasal smell =

Term

Retronasal smell, retronasal olfaction, is the ability to perceive flavor dimensions of foods and drinks. Retronasal smell is a sensory modality that produces flavor. It is best described as a combination of traditional smell (orthonasal smell) and taste modalities. Retronasal smell creates flavor from smell molecules in foods or drinks shunting up through the nasal passages as one is chewing. When people use the term "smell", they are usually referring to "orthonasal smell", or the perception of smell molecules that enter directly through the nose and up the nasal passages. Retronasal smell is critical for experiencing the flavor of foods and drinks. Flavor should be contrasted with taste, which refers to five specific dimensions: (1) sweet, (2) salty, (3) bitter, (4) sour, and (5) umami. Perceiving anything beyond these five dimensions, such as distinguishing the flavor of an apple from a pear for example, requires the sense of retronasal smell.

== History ==
Evolutionarily, smell has long been presumed to be a less-important sense for humans, especially compared to vision. Vision appears to dominate human stimuli perception, but researchers now argue that smell cues are highly informative to humans despite being less obviously so. Before his death in 1826, French gastronome Brillat-Savarin published his book, The Physiology of Taste; Or, Meditations on Transcendental Gastronomy: Theoretical, Historical, and Practical Work, in which he makes the first mention of the importance of smell in the “combined sense” of taste. He defines taste in terms of the five taste dimensions in addition to flavor created with the nasal apparatus. Avery Gilbert, in his book The Nose Knows, reviews the work of Henry T. Finck, an American philosopher from the late 1800s who published a groundbreaking essay titled “The Gastronomic Value of Odours.” Flink called flavor a “second way of smelling,” and much subsequent scientific investigation in the early 1900s focused on attempting to break down smell dimensions into basic categories, a feat that has proven too complicated due to the vast number and complexity of odors.

Food connoisseurs and chefs are increasingly capitalizing on the newly ascertained understanding of the role smell plays in flavor. Food scientists Nicholas Kurti and Hervé This expanded upon the physiology of flavor and its importance in the culinary arts. In 2006, This published his book, Molecular Gastronomy: Exploring the Science of Flavor, in which he explores the physical mechanisms that bring about flavor perception. Kurti and This influenced others, such as Harold McGee, whose 1984 book, On Food and Cooking: The Science and Lore of the Kitchen, has been extensively revised in 2004 and remains a key reference on the scientific understanding of food preparation. His book has been described by television personality Alton Brown as “the Rosetta stone of the culinary world.” Such a breakthrough in the understanding of the mechanisms behind experiencing the flavor of different foods is likely to continue inspiring those in the culinary arts to create novel combinations and recipes.

Today, one of the most active food psychologists, Paul Rozin has been the first to successfully map the role of retronasal smell in flavor. In 1982, he explained that smell is a “dual-sense” and made the explicit differentiation between retronasal smell and orthonasal smell. Rozin describes orthonasal smell as “breathing in” and retronasal smell as “breathing out.” In 1982, he devised an experiment in which he trained participants to accurately recognize smells orthonasally before introducing them to the back of the mouth, at which point the success rate fell drastically, demonstrating that smell operates through two distinct mechanisms. His favored example of this duality is Limburger cheese, which is known for its repulsiveness to the nose yet pleasantness to the mouth.

Originally published in 2012, Neurogastronomy by Gordon M. Shepherd provides an overview of the way smell is perceived in humans. The book comprises a detailed review of how retronasal smell, in combination with taste, creates flavor. Shepherd describes the neural basis for identification, recognition, and preference for certain flavors, and explores potential political and social implications of a deeper understanding of flavor perception, such as causes of obesity and concerns of loss of smell sensitivity in old age.

== Overview of the smell pathway ==
To better understand this mechanism, a simple breakdown of smell pathway is provided below. When humans chew, volatile flavor compounds are pushed through the nasopharynx and smell receptors.

Human olfactory system. 1: Olfactory bulb 2: Mitral cells 3: Bone 4: Nasal epithelium 5: Glomerulus 6: Olfactory receptor neurons

=== Olfactory epithelium ===
The first stop in the olfactory system is the olfactory epithelium, or tissue resting on the roof of the nasal cavity which houses smell receptors. Smell receptors are bipolar neurons that bind odorants from the air and congregate at the olfactory nerve before passing axons to the dendrites of mitral cells in the olfactory bulb. Sensory receptors in the mouth and nose are polarized at resting state, and they depolarize in response to some change in environment, such as coming in contact with odor molecules. Odor molecules, consisting of hydrocarbon chains with functional groups, bind to sensory receptors in the nose and mouth. Properties of functional groups include: (1) length of carbon chain, (2) terminal group, which concord with differences associated with different smells, (3) side group, (4) chirality, (5) shape, and (6) size. When odor molecules bind to sensory receptors, they do so in according to these properties. Each olfactory cell has a single type of receptor, but that receptor can be “broadly tuned” and odor molecules further interact at the receptor level, meaning that, in certain cases, an odor molecule alone may not bind to a receptor, but in the presence of another odor molecule, the original would bind and thus create a sensation of smell only in the presence of the second molecule.

=== Olfactory bulb ===
In the olfactory bulb, smell molecules are mapped spatially. These spatial representations are known as “smell images." Spatial representation permits lateral inhibition, or contrast enhancement and gain compression. Contrast enhancement is sensitive to change and highlights stimuli in the brain that are changing rather than at rest. Gain compression heightens sensitivity to low-intensity stimuli while lessening sensitivity to high-intensity stimuli. The olfactory bulb, while still in the primary stages of its understanding by researchers, distinguishes smell from other senses because it marks a deviation in the sensory pathway from what is characteristic of all other senses. Namely, all non-olfactory sensory information passes through the thalamus after the receptor level, but the fact that odor information instead enters its own specialized area could suggest the primitive history of smell and/or a distinct type of processing of odor information on its way to the cortex. The olfactory bulb houses glomeruli, or cell junctures, on which thousands of receptors of the same type, in addition to mitral cells, converge. This organization allows a vast amount of information to be concisely represented without requiring an equally large number of receptor types. The resulting combination of odor information is dubbed an odor image at the level of the olfactory bulb.

==== Imaging in the olfactory bulb ====
===== 2DG method =====
In 1977, biochemist Lou Sokoloff, Seymour Kety, and Floyd E. Bloom developed a way of mapping activity in the brain by tracking the rat brain's metabolization of oxygen. Nerve cells require oxygen and glucose for energy. 2-deoxyglucose (2DG) is a radioactive glucose isotope that can be tracked in the brain since it leaves a trace in the cell where it would normally be metabolized for energy if it were glucose. After stimulation of a certain region of cells, X-ray photographs can be sliced to reveal which cells were active, particularly at synaptic junctures.

Functional magnetic resonance imaging (fMRI) can also be used to measure metabolism of an odor. This method is not terminal as is the 2-deoxyglucose method, so one animal can be measured with many odors, and the resulted images can be compared.

===== Green fluorescent protein method =====
Finally, the green fluorescent protein method genetically engineers mice to express a protein in active neurons, and a camera can then be placed inside the skull of the mouse to measure activity.

===== Findings =====
These methods reveal, most notably, that the organization of smell information in the olfactory bulb is spatial. Similar molecular patterns result in similar activation patterns with regard to glomeruli, and glomeruli that are closer together encode similar features of smell information.

=== Olfactory cortex ===
The three-layered olfactory cortex, containing pyramidal cells is the next benchmark on the smell pathway. One pyramidal cell receives information from a multiplicity of mitral cells from the olfactory bulb, making the previously organized glomerular pattern distributed in the olfactory cortex. This dispersion of mitral cell information allows for self-excitatory feedback connections, lateral excitation, and self- and lateral-inhibition. These processes contribute to Hebbian learning, named after Donald O. Hebb, and is often simplified by the saying “neurons that fire together wire together.” Long-term potentiation, the neural mechanism for Hebbian learning, allows for memory formation at the pyramidal cell level. Hebbian learning is thus essentially the phenomenon by which the olfactory cortex “remembers” the output of combinations of smell molecules and allows for recognition of previously sensed combinations faster than novel ones by matching them to stored input. The resulting smells that were previously called odor images are stored in the olfactory cortex for recognition are referred to now as odor objects. Experience therefore strengthens signal-to-noise ratio in that a previously sensed odor object can be more easily distinguished against greater background noise.

=== Orbitofrontal cortex ===
The orbitofrontal cortex (OFC) is the final destination of the odor information and is where conscious smell perception arises. Smell information enters directly after passing through the olfactory cortex, which marks the distinction from other sensory information that first pass through the thalamus. The OFC is located dorsal to the prefrontal cortex, allowing smell information direct input to the prefrontal cortex, or the major decision-making area of the brain. There are three sets of neurons that process smell information before it reaches the OFC: the olfactory receptor cells in the olfactory epithelium, mitral cells, and olfactory pyramidal neurons.

At the level of the OFC, associations with other brain areas are made, including input from the mouth (somatosensation), emotional input (amygdala), visual information, and evaluative information (prefrontal cortex). The OFC is responsible for selective odor tuning, fusing of sensory domains, and hedonic evaluations of smells.

== At-home evidence of the role smell plays in flavor ==
The experience of eating favored foods with a cold often disappoints. This is because congestion blocks nasal passageways through which air and flavor molecules enter and exit, thus temporarily reducing retronasal smell capacity.

Another way to isolate the sense of retronasal smell is to use the “nose pinch test.” When eating while pinching the nostrils closed, the flavor of food appears to dissipate, namely because the pathway for air exiting the nose that creates the flavor image is blocked.

Some commercial products rely on retronasal smell, such as a water bottle whose scented pods create the illusion of flavor when drinking plain water.

== Significance and Application ==
As the exact processes are not yet fully understood and could be used for further development of food, retronasal perception is of particular importance for science and industry. A first theoretical application in a product was provided by the US startup The Right Cup, which developed a drinking cup with a scented silicone ring up until 2017, which was supposed to enable both retronasal and orthonasal aroma perception. The scent of the silicone ring was intended to give pure water a lemonade-like fruit flavor. In practice, however, it is primarily the orthonasal perception that plays a role in the product, so that the comments of the very successful crowdfunding campaign were predominantly negative. Since 2017, the startup air up GmbH, a spin-off of the Technical University of Munich, has been working on a drinking bottle that aromatizes water via retronasal aroma perception. The first steps was conducted under the project titel "JOYCE" and sponsored with European public grants. In air ups system, water is conducted into the mouth together with volatile aroma substances in the gas phase, where they separate from the water and are perceived retronasally.

== Speculative evolutionary significance ==
Deeper understanding of the role of retronasal smell in flavor has led many to rethink smell's evolutionary significance in humans. To dispel the notion that vision is wholly superior in humans and higher primates to olfaction, Gordon M. Shepherd contrasts the anatomy of the human nose to that of a canine. In canines, smell receptors reside in the back of the nasal cavity. They have a unique cartridge-like organ that serves as an air filter. During quiet breathing, this cartridge directs the stream of air normally, but during active smelling, the rate of direction of information increases, allowing a canine to sniff as much as six to eight times faster than a human.

This suggests that canines are adapted for stronger orthonasal smell capabilities. By contrast, humans seem to be selected to have superior retronasal smell capacities. The bipedal posture of humans reduces the need for a cartridge that functions in canines to mainly clean air entering. The short nasopharynx for retronasal smell in humans is what allows the volatiles from foods and drinks to travel from the mouth to the smell receptors in the nasal cavity. What remains less clear is the fact that canines still have a strong ability to discriminate foods.

Other speculations include the idea that the short route from the mouth to the nasal cavity resulted from selection from long-distance running when humans migrated out of Africa 2 million years ago. The idea is that a shorter nasal apparatus would aid in balancing the head to facilitate distance running. Lieberman cites other evolutionary changes that could have resulted from selection for running such as wider joint cartilages and longer bones in the legs.
