= Presbyosmia =

Olfactory disorder

Presbyosmia is the gradual degeneration of sense of smell due to ageing process, which occurs especially in those who are 70 years old or more. It is possibly due to loss of nerve endings in the nose, as well as reduced mucus production. Presbyosmia is less prevalent among elderly who are healthy, and who lack the risk factors for smell disorders. Other factors among elderly that can effect the sense of smell are medication use and some neurological disorders (such as DLB and Parkinson's disease), in these cases the loss of smell can be much more noticeable. There is currently no established treatment for this condition.
