= Sense of smell =

Sense that detects smells

Smell
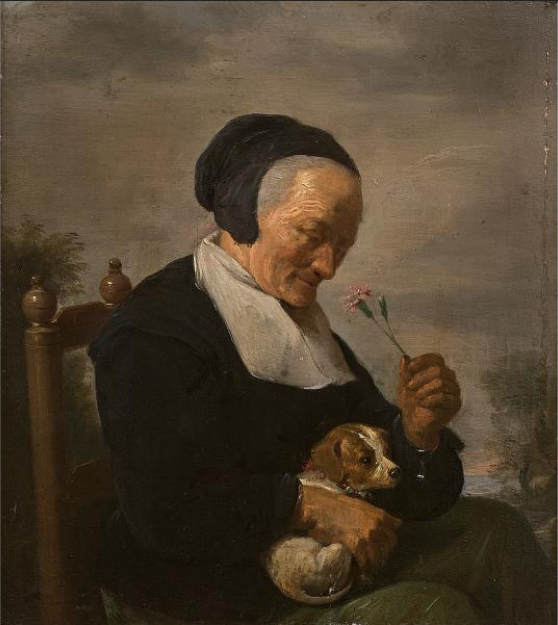
- Painting of a woman smelling a carnation. Olfaction uses chemoreceptors that create signals processed in the brain that form the sense of smell.

Details
- System: Olfactory system
- Function: sense chemicals in the environment that are used to form the sense of smell

Identifiers
- MeSH: D012903

The sense of smell, or olfaction, (Note: Coined from Latin: olfactus, past participle of olfactere, "to smell", itself from olere "to emit a smell" and facere "to make".) is the special sense through which smells (or odors) are perceived. The sense of smell has many functions, including detecting desirable foods, hazards, and pheromones, and plays a role in taste.

In humans, it occurs when an odor binds to a receptor within the nasal cavity, transmitting a signal through the olfactory system. Glomeruli aggregate signals from these receptors and transmit them to the olfactory bulb, where the sensory input will start to interact with parts of the brain responsible for smell identification, memory, and emotion.

There are many different things which can interfere with a normal sense of smell, including damage to the nose or smell receptors, anosmia, nasal congestion, upper respiratory infections, traumatic brain injury, and neurodegenerative disease.

== History of study ==
The Lady and the Unicorn, a Flemish tapestry depicting the sense of smell, 1484–1500. Musée national du Moyen Âge, Paris.

Early scientific study of the sense of smell includes the extensive doctoral dissertation of Eleanor Gamble, published in 1898, which compared olfactory to other stimulus modalities, and implied that smell had a lower intensity discrimination.

As the Epicurean and atomistic Roman philosopher Lucretius (1st century BC) speculated, different odors are attributed to different shapes and sizes of "atoms" (odor molecules in the modern understanding) that stimulate the olfactory organ.

A modern demonstration of that theory was the cloning of olfactory receptor proteins by Linda B. Buck and Richard Axel (who were awarded the Nobel Prize in 2004), and subsequent pairing of odor molecules to specific receptor proteins. Each odor receptor molecule recognizes only a particular molecular feature or class of odor molecules. Mammals have about a thousand genes that code for odor reception. Of the genes that code for odor receptors, only a portion are functional. Humans have far fewer active odor receptor genes than other primates and other mammals. In mammals, each olfactory receptor neuron expresses only one functional odor receptor. Odor receptor nerve cells function like a key–lock system: if the airborne molecules of a certain chemical can fit into the lock, the nerve cell will respond.

There are, at present, a number of competing theories regarding the mechanism of odor coding and perception. According to the shape theory, each receptor detects a feature of the odor molecule. The weak-shape theory, known as the odotope theory, suggests that different receptors detect only small pieces of molecules, and these minimal inputs are combined to form a larger olfactory perception (similar to the way visual perception is built up of smaller, information-poor sensations, combined and refined to create a detailed overall perception).

According to a new study, researchers have found that a functional relationship exists between molecular volume of odorants and the olfactory neural response. An alternative theory, the vibration theory proposed by Luca Turin, posits that odor receptors detect the frequencies of vibrations of odor molecules in the infrared range by quantum tunnelling. However, the behavioral predictions of this theory have been called into question. There is no theory yet that explains olfactory perception completely.

== Function ==
=== Taste ===
Flavor perception is an aggregation of auditory, taste, haptic, and smell sensory information. Retronasal smell plays the biggest role in the sensation of flavor. During the process of mastication, the tongue manipulates food to release odorants. These odorants enter the nasal cavity during exhalation. The smell of food has the sensation of being in the mouth because of co-activation of the motor cortex and olfactory epithelium during mastication.

Smell, taste, and trigeminal receptors (also called chemesthesis) together contribute to flavor. The human tongue can distinguish only among five distinct qualities of taste, while the nose can distinguish among hundreds of substances, even in minute quantities. It is during exhalation that the smell's contribution to flavor occurs, in contrast to that of proper smell, which occurs during the inhalation phase of breathing. The olfactory system is the only human sense that bypasses the thalamus and connects directly to the forebrain.

=== Hearing ===
Smell and sound information has been shown to converge in the olfactory tubercles of rodents. This neural convergence is proposed to give rise to a perception termed smound. Whereas a flavor results from interactions between smell and taste, a smound may result from interactions between smell and sound.

=== Inbreeding avoidance ===
The MHC genes (known as HLA in humans) are a group of genes present in many animals and important for the immune system; in general, offspring from parents with differing MHC genes have a stronger immune system. Fish, mice, and female humans are able to smell some aspect of the MHC genes of potential sex partners and prefer partners with MHC genes different from their own. However, some research suggests that taking hormonal contraception can alter women's preference for partners with dissimilar MHC genes, thus resulting in a greater likelihood to choose partners with relatively similar MHC genes to their own. Sexual orientation can also influence preference for different body odors, and some studies suggest that preference may be influenced by the putative pheromones AND and EST.

Humans can detect blood relatives from olfaction. Mothers can identify by body odor their biological children but not their stepchildren. Pre-adolescent children can olfactorily detect their full siblings but not half-siblings or step siblings, and this might explain incest avoidance and the Westermarck effect. Functional imaging shows that this olfactory kinship detection process involves the frontal-temporal junction, the insula, and the dorsomedial prefrontal cortex, but not the primary or secondary olfactory cortices, or the related piriform cortex or orbitofrontal cortex.

Since inbreeding is detrimental, it tends to be avoided. In the house mouse, the major urinary protein (MUP) gene cluster provides a highly polymorphic scent signal of genetic identity that appears to underlie kin recognition and inbreeding avoidance. Thus, there are fewer matings between mice sharing MUP haplotypes than would be expected if there were random mating.

=== Guiding movement ===
Some animals use scent trails to guide movement, for example social insects may lay down a trail to a food source, or a tracking dog may follow the scent of its target. A number of scent-tracking strategies have been studied in different species, including gradient search or chemotaxis, anemotaxis, klinotaxis, and tropotaxis. Their success is influenced by the turbulence of the air plume that is being followed.

== Genetics ==
Different people smell various odors, and most of these differences are caused by genetic variation. Although odorant receptor genes make up one of the largest gene families in the human genome, only a handful of genes have been conclusively linked to particular smells. For instance, the odorant receptor OR5A1 and its genetic variants (alleles) determine the ability to smell β-ionone, a key aroma compound in foods and beverages. Similarly, the odorant receptor OR2J3 is associated with the ability to detect the "grassy" odor, cis-3-hexen-1-ol. The preference (or dislike) of cilantro (coriander) has been linked to the olfactory receptor OR6A2.

== Variability amongst vertebrates ==
The importance and sensitivity of smell varies among different organisms; most mammals have a good sense of smell, whereas most birds do not, except the tubenoses (e.g., petrels and albatrosses), certain species of new world vultures, and the kiwis. Also, birds have hundreds of olfactory receptors. Although, recent analysis of the chemical composition of volatile organic compounds (VOCs) from king penguin feathers suggest that VOCs may provide olfactory cues, used by the penguins to locate their colony and recognize individuals. Among mammals, it is well developed in the carnivores and ungulates, which must always be aware of each other, and in those that smell for their food, such as moles. Having a strong sense of smell is referred to as macrosmatic in contrast to having a weak sense of smell which is referred to as microsmatic.

Figures suggesting greater or lesser sensitivity in various species reflect experimental findings from the reactions of animals exposed to aromas in known extreme dilutions. These are, therefore, based on perceptions by these animals, rather than mere nasal function. That is, the brain's smell-recognizing centers must react to the stimulus detected for the animal to be said to show a response to the smell in question. It is estimated that dogs, in general, have an olfactory sense approximately ten thousand to a hundred thousand times more acute than a human's. This does not mean they are overwhelmed by smells our noses can detect; rather, it means they can discern a molecular presence when it is in much greater dilution in the carrier, air.

Scent hounds as a group can smell one- to ten-million times more acutely than a human, and bloodhounds, which have the keenest sense of smell of any dogs, have noses ten- to one-hundred-million times more sensitive than a human's. They were bred for the specific purpose of tracking humans, and can detect a scent trail a few days old. The second-most-sensitive nose is possessed by the Basset Hound, which was bred to track and hunt rabbits and other small animals.

Grizzly bears have a sense of smell seven times stronger than that of the bloodhound, essential for locating food underground. Using their elongated claws, bears dig deep trenches in search of burrowing animals and nests as well as roots, bulbs, and insects. Bears can detect the scent of food from up to eighteen miles away; because of their immense size, they often scavenge new kills, driving away the predators (including packs of wolves and human hunters) in the process.

The sense of smell is less developed in the catarrhine primates, and nonexistent in cetaceans, which compensate with a well-developed sense of taste. In some strepsirrhines, such as the red-bellied lemur, scent glands occur atop the head.

Fish, too, have a well-developed sense of smell, even though they inhabit an aquatic environment. Salmon utilize their sense of smell to identify and return to their home stream waters. Catfish use their sense of smell to identify other individual catfish and to maintain a social hierarchy. Many fishes use the sense of smell to identify mating partners or to alert to the presence of food.

=== Human smell abilities ===
Although conventional wisdom and lay literature, based on impressionistic findings in the 1920s, have long presented human smell as capable of distinguishing between roughly 10,000 unique odors, recent research has suggested that the average individual is capable of distinguishing over one trillion unique odors. Researchers in the most recent study, which tested the psychophysical responses to combinations of over 128 unique odor molecules with combinations composed of up to 30 different component molecules, noted that this estimate is "conservative" and that some subjects of their research might be capable of deciphering between a thousand trillion odorants, adding that their worst performer could probably still distinguish between 80 million scents. Authors of the study concluded, "This is far more than previous estimates of distinguishable olfactory stimuli. It demonstrates that the human olfactory system, with its hundreds of different olfactory receptors, far out performs the other senses in the number of physically different stimuli it can discriminate." However, it was also noted by the authors that the ability to distinguish between smells is not analogous to being able to consistently identify them, and that subjects were not typically capable of identifying individual odor stimulants from within the odors the researchers had prepared from multiple odor molecules. In November 2014 the study was strongly criticized by Caltech scientist Markus Meister, who wrote that the study's "extravagant claims are based on errors of mathematical logic." The logic of his paper has in turn been criticized by the authors of the original paper.

== Physiological basis in vertebrates ==
=== Main olfactory system ===
In humans and other vertebrates, smells are sensed by olfactory sensory neurons in the olfactory epithelium. The olfactory epithelium is made up of at least six morphologically and biochemically different cell types. The proportion of olfactory epithelium compared to respiratory epithelium (not innervated, or supplied with nerves) gives an indication of the animal's olfactory sensitivity. Humans have about 10 cm^{2} (1.6 sq in) of olfactory epithelium, whereas some dogs have 170 cm^{2} (26 sq in). A dog's olfactory epithelium is also considerably more densely innervated, with a hundred times more receptors per square centimeter. The sensory olfactory system integrates with other senses to form the perception of flavor. Often, land organisms will have separate olfaction systems for smell and taste (orthonasal smell and retronasal smell), but water-dwelling organisms usually have only one system.

Molecules of odorants passing through the superior nasal concha of the nasal passages dissolve in the mucus that lines the superior portion of the cavity and are detected by olfactory receptors on the dendrites of the olfactory sensory neurons. This may occur by diffusion or by the binding of the odorant to odorant-binding proteins. The mucus overlying the epithelium contains mucopolysaccharides, salts, enzymes, and antibodies (these are highly important, as the olfactory neurons provide a direct passage for infection to pass to the brain). This mucus acts as a solvent for odor molecules, flows constantly, and is replaced approximately every ten minutes.

In insects, smells are sensed by olfactory sensory neurons in the chemosensory sensilla, which are present in insect antenna, palps, and tarsa, but also on other parts of the insect body. Odorants penetrate into the cuticle pores of chemosensory sensilla and get in contact with insect odorant-binding proteins (OBPs) or Chemosensory proteins (CSPs), before activating the sensory neurons.

=== Receptor neuron ===
The binding of the ligand (odor molecule or odorant) to the receptor leads to an action potential in the receptor neuron, via a second messenger pathway, depending on the organism. In mammals, the odorants stimulate adenylate cyclase to synthesize cAMP via a G protein called G_{olf}. cAMP, which is the second messenger here, opens a cyclic nucleotide-gated ion channel (CNG), producing an influx of cations (largely Ca^{2+} with some Na^{+}) into the cell, slightly depolarising it. The Ca^{2+} in turn opens a Ca^{2+}-activated chloride channel, leading to efflux of Cl^{−}, further depolarizing the cell and triggering an action potential. Ca^{2+} is then extruded through a sodium-calcium exchanger. A calcium-calmodulin complex also acts to inhibit the binding of cAMP to the cAMP-dependent channel, thus contributing to olfactory adaptation.

The main olfactory system of some mammals also contains small subpopulations of olfactory sensory neurons that detect and transduce odors somewhat differently. Olfactory sensory neurons that use trace amine-associated receptors (TAARs) to detect odors use the same second messenger signaling cascade as do the canonical olfactory sensory neurons. Other subpopulations, such as those that express the receptor guanylyl cyclase GC-D (Gucy2d) or the soluble guanylyl cyclase Gucy1b2, use a cGMP cascade to transduce their odorant ligands. These distinct subpopulations (olfactory subsystems) appear specialized for the detection of small groups of chemical stimuli.

This mechanism of transduction is somewhat unusual, in that cAMP works by directly binding to the ion channel rather than through activation of protein kinase A. It is similar to the transduction mechanism for photoreceptors, in which the second messenger cGMP works by directly binding to ion channels, suggesting that maybe one of these receptors was evolutionarily adapted into the other. There are also considerable similarities in the immediate processing of stimuli by lateral inhibition.

Averaged activity of the receptor neurons can be measured in several ways. In vertebrates, responses to an odor can be measured by an electro-olfactogram or through calcium imaging of receptor neuron terminals in the olfactory bulb. In insects, one can perform electroantennography or calcium imaging within the olfactory bulb.

=== Olfactory bulb projections ===
Schematic of the early olfactory system including the olfactory epithelium and bulb. Each ORN expresses one OR that responds to different odorants. Odorant molecules bind to ORs on cilia. ORs activate ORNs that transduce the input signal into action potentials. In general, glomeruli receive input from ORs of one specific type and connect to the principal neurons of the OB, mitral and tufted cells (MT cells).

Olfactory sensory neurons project axons to the brain within the olfactory nerve, (cranial nerve I). These nerve fibers, lacking myelin sheaths, pass to the olfactory bulb of the brain through perforations in the cribriform plate, which in turn projects olfactory information to the olfactory cortex and other areas. The axons from the olfactory receptors converge in the outer layer of the olfactory bulb within small (≈50 micrometers in diameter) structures called glomeruli. Mitral cells, located in the inner layer of the olfactory bulb, form synapses with the axons of the sensory neurons within glomeruli and send the information about the odor to other parts of the olfactory system, where multiple signals may be processed to form a synthesized olfactory perception. A large degree of convergence occurs, with 25,000 axons synapsing on 25 or so mitral cells, and with each of these mitral cells projecting to multiple glomeruli. Mitral cells also project to periglomerular cells and granular cells that inhibit the mitral cells surrounding it (lateral inhibition). Granular cells also mediate inhibition and excitation of mitral cells through pathways from centrifugal fibers and the anterior olfactory nuclei. Neuromodulators like acetylcholine, serotonin and norepinephrine all send axons to the olfactory bulb and have been implicated in gain modulation, pattern separation, and memory functions, respectively.

The mitral cells leave the olfactory bulb in the lateral olfactory tract, which synapses on five major regions of the cerebrum: the anterior olfactory nucleus, the olfactory tubercle, the amygdala, the piriform cortex, and the entorhinal cortex. The anterior olfactory nucleus projects, via the anterior commissure, to the contralateral olfactory bulb, inhibiting it. The piriform cortex has two major divisions with anatomically distinct organizations and functions. The anterior piriform cortex (APC) appears to be better at determining the chemical structure of the odorant molecules, and the posterior piriform cortex (PPC) has a strong role in categorizing odors and assessing similarities between odors (e.g. minty, woody, and citrus are odors that can, despite being highly variant chemicals, be distinguished via the PPC in a concentration-independent manner). The piriform cortex projects to the medial dorsal nucleus of the thalamus, which then projects to the orbitofrontal cortex. The orbitofrontal cortex mediates conscious perception of the odor. The three-layered piriform cortex projects to a number of thalamic and hypothalamic nuclei, the hippocampus and amygdala and the orbitofrontal cortex, but its function is largely unknown. The entorhinal cortex projects to the amygdala and is involved in emotional and autonomic responses to odor. It also projects to the hippocampus and is involved in motivation and memory. Odor information is stored in long-term memory and has strong connections to emotional memory. This is possibly due to the olfactory system's close anatomical ties to the limbic system and hippocampus, areas of the brain that have long been known to be involved in emotion and place memory, respectively.

Since any one receptor is responsive to various odorants, and there is a great deal of convergence at the level of the olfactory bulb, it may seem strange that human beings are able to distinguish so many different odors. It seems that a highly complex form of processing must be occurring; however, as it can be shown that, while many neurons in the olfactory bulb (and even the pyriform cortex and amygdala) are responsive to many different odors, half the neurons in the orbitofrontal cortex are responsive to only one odor, and the rest to only a few. It has been shown through microelectrode studies that each individual odor gives a particular spatial map of excitation in the olfactory bulb. It is possible that the brain is able to distinguish specific odors through spatial encoding, but temporal coding must also be taken into account. Over time, the spatial maps change, even for one particular odor, and the brain must be able to process these details as well.

Inputs from the two nostrils have separate inputs to the brain, with the result that, when each nostril takes up a different odorant, a person may experience perceptual rivalry in the olfactory sense akin to that of binocular rivalry.

In insects, smells are sensed by sensilla located on the antenna and maxillary palp and first processed by the antennal lobe (analogous to the olfactory bulb), and next by the mushroom bodies and lateral horn.

=== Coding and perception ===
The process by which olfactory information is coded in the brain to allow for proper perception is still being researched, and is not completely understood. When an odorant is detected by receptors, they in a sense break the odorant down, and then the brain puts the odorant back together for identification and perception. The odorant binds to receptors that recognize only a specific functional group, or feature, of the odorant, which is why the chemical nature of the odorant is important.

After binding the odorant, the receptor is activated and will send a signal to the glomeruli in the olfactory bulb. Each glomerulus receives signals from multiple receptors that detect similar odorant features. Because several receptor types are activated due to the different chemical features of the odorant, several glomeruli are activated as well. The signals from the glomeruli are transformed to a pattern of oscillations of neural activities of the mitral cells, the output neurons from the olfactory bulb. Olfactory bulb sends this pattern to the olfactory cortex. Olfactory cortex is thought to have associative memories, so that it resonates to this bulbar pattern when the odor object is recognized. The cortex sends centrifugal feedback to the bulb. This feedback could suppress bulbar responses to the recognized odor objects, causing olfactory adaptation to background odors, so that the newly arrived foreground odor objects could be singled out for better recognition. During odor search, feedback could also be used to enhance odor detection. The distributed code allows the brain to detect specific odors in mixtures of many background odors.

It is a general idea that the layout of brain structures corresponds to physical features of stimuli (called topographic coding), and similar analogies have been made in smell with concepts such as a layout corresponding to chemical features (called chemotopy) or perceptual features. While chemotopy remains a highly controversial concept, evidence exists for perceptual information implemented in the spatial dimensions of olfactory networks.

=== Accessory olfactory system ===
Many animals, including most mammals and reptiles, but not humans, have two distinct and segregated olfactory systems: a main olfactory system, which detects volatile stimuli, and an accessory olfactory system, which detects fluid-phase stimuli. Behavioral evidence suggests that these fluid-phase stimuli often function as pheromones, although pheromones can also be detected by the main olfactory system. In the accessory olfactory system, stimuli are detected by the vomeronasal organ, located in the vomer, between the nose and the mouth. Snakes use it to smell prey, sticking their tongue out and touching it to the organ. Some mammals make a facial expression called flehmen to direct stimuli to this organ.

The sensory receptors of the accessory olfactory system are located in the vomeronasal organ. As in the main olfactory system, the axons of these sensory neurons project from the vomeronasal organ to the accessory olfactory bulb, which in the mouse is located on the dorsal-posterior portion of the main olfactory bulb. Unlike in the main olfactory system, the axons that leave the accessory olfactory bulb do not project to the brain's cortex but rather to targets in the amygdala and bed nucleus of the stria terminalis, and from there to the hypothalamus, where they may influence aggression and mating behavior.

== In insects ==
Insect olfaction refers to the function of chemical receptors that enable insects to detect and identify volatile compounds for foraging, predator avoidance, finding mating partners (via pheromones) and locating oviposition habitats. Thus, it is the most important sensation for insects. Most important insect behaviors must be timed perfectly which is dependent on what they smell and when they smell it. For example, smell is essential for hunting in many species of wasps, including Polybia sericea.

The two organs insects primarily use for detecting odors are the antennae and specialized mouth parts called the maxillary palps. However, a recent study has demonstrated the olfactory role of ovipositor in fig wasps. Inside of these olfactory organs there are neurons called olfactory receptor neurons which, as the name implies, house receptors for scent molecules in their cell membranes. The majority of olfactory receptor neurons typically reside in the antenna. These neurons can be very abundant, for example Drosophila flies have 2,600 olfactory sensory neurons.

Insects are capable of smelling and differentiating between thousands of volatile compounds both sensitively and selectively. Sensitivity is how attuned the insect is to very small amounts of an odorant or small changes in the concentration of an odorant. Selectivity refers to the insects' ability to tell one odorant apart from another. These compounds are commonly broken into three classes: short chain carboxylic acids, aldehydes and low molecular weight nitrogenous compounds. Some insects, such as the moth Deilephila elpenor, use smell as a means to find food sources. In many species, smell is highly tuned to pheromones; a male silkworm moth, for example, can sense a single molecule of bombykol.

== In plants ==
The tendrils of plants are especially sensitive to airborne volatile organic compounds. Parasites such as dodder make use of this in locating their preferred hosts and locking on to them. The emission of volatile compounds is detected when foliage is browsed by animals. Threatened plants are then able to take defensive chemical measures, such as moving tannin compounds to their foliage.

== Machine-based smelling ==
Scientists have devised methods for quantifying the intensity of odors, in particular for the purpose of analyzing unpleasant or objectionable odors released by an industrial source into a community. Since the 1800s industrial countries have faced incidents where the proximity of an industrial source or landfill caused adverse reactions among nearby residents. These reactions were due to unpleasant airborne odor. The basic theory of odor analysis is to measure what extent of dilution with "pure" air is required before the sample in question is rendered indistinguishable from the "pure" or reference standard. Since each person perceives odor differently, an "odor panel" composed of several different people is assembled, each sniffing the same sample of diluted specimen air. A field olfactometer can be utilized to determine the magnitude of an odor.

Many air management districts in the US have numerical standards of acceptability for the intensity of odor that is allowed to cross into a residential property. For example, the Bay Area Air Quality Management District has applied its standard in regulating numerous industries, landfills, and sewage treatment plants. Example applications this district has engaged are the San Mateo, California, wastewater treatment plant; the Shoreline Amphitheatre in Mountain View, California; and the IT Corporation waste ponds, Martinez, California.

== Culture ==
In western cultures, the amount of value traditionally bestowed on the sense of smell has derived from how it places within the mind–body dualism. The mind, held to be superior to the body, has been associated with the "refined" senses of vision and hearing, while sense of smell, along with taste, have been considered "chemical" senses, associated with the body, and less valued. This derision arises in part as it is hard to abstract smell; it is difficult to describe an odor without reference to its source (e.g. describing vanilla). This value system contrasts with that of Japan, where more value is placed on the sense of smell, and where Kōdō, the art of appreciating incense, is practiced.

Aroma is understood to stimulate recall, a characteristic emphasized by Proust in In Search of Lost Time. The smells of home cooking, such as the smells of holiday meals and chocolate chip cookies has been described as particularly evocative.

== Classification ==
Systems of classifying odors include:

- Crocker-Henderson system, which rates smells on a 0-8 scale for each of four "primary" smells: fragrant, acid, burnt, and caprylic.
- Henning's prism
- Zwaardemaker smell system (invented by Hendrik Zwaardemaker)

== Disorders ==
Specific terms are used to describe disorders associated with smelling:

- Anosmia: inability to smell
- Hyperosmia: an abnormally acute sense of smell
- Hyposmia: decreased ability to smell
- Presbyosmia: the natural decline in the sense of smell in old age
- Dysosmia: distortion in the sense of smell
  - Parosmia: distortion in the perception of an odor
  - Phantosmia: distortion in the absence of an odor, "hallucinated smell"
- Heterosmia: inability to distinguish odors
- Desiderosmia: a compulsive craving for certain odors (e.g., rubber tires, gasoline). This has been associated with iron deficiency anemia.
- Olfactory reference syndrome: psychological disorder that causes the patient to imagine he or she has strong body odor
- Osmophobia: aversion or psychological hypersensitivity to odors
- Primary Sjögren's syndrome: may impair chemosensory function, including taste and smell

Viruses can also infect the olfactory epithelium leading to a loss of the sense of olfaction. About 50% of patients with SARS-CoV-2 (causing COVID-19) experience some type of disorder associated with their sense of smell, including anosmia and parosmia. SARS-CoV-1, MERS-CoV and even the flu (influenza virus) can also disrupt olfaction.

== See also ==
- Electronic nose
- Evolution of olfaction
- Nasal administration olfactory transfer
- Odor source localization
- Olfactic Communication
- Olfactory ensheathing cell
- Olfactory fatigue
- Perfume (novel)
- Scent transfer unit
