= Air Up =

German water bottle manufacturer

air up GmbH
- Type: GmbH
- Industry: Bottle manufacturer
- Founded: 2018
- Headquarters: Munich, Germany
- Key people: Jannis Koppitz; Simon Nüesch; Christian Hauth; Magdalena Jüngst; Tim Jäger; Fabian Schlang
- Products: water bottle that enhances plain water with flavour
- Revenue: >€200 million
- Number of employees: >300
- Website: air-up.com

air up GmbH is a water bottle manufacturer headquartered in Munich, Germany. The company claims to have developed a drinking system that works through scents by means of retronasal smell. The company employed more than 300 employees by 2023.

== History ==
=== Foundation and expansion (2018–2022) ===
Founded in 2018 by Fabian Schlang, Tim Jäger, Lena Jüngst, Simon Nüesch, and Jannis Koppitz, the idea for air up emerged in 2016 during the product design studies of Jüngst and Jäger. Their aim was to develop a flavoured water option without added sugars.

Within the first six weeks of its establishment, the company sold 80,000 bottles via online marketplaces and offline retail. By 2019, their bottles were being sold online.

The company subsequently expanded across Europe, including Austria, Switzerland, the Netherlands, France, Belgium, the United Kingdom, Italy, and Sweden. In 2022, air up made its entry into the US market and introduced eleven new flavours that same year.

Over the years, the company has raised over €60 million through various funding rounds, attracting investments from beverage company PepsiCo and venture capitalist Frank Thelen. In the fiscal year 2022, air up reported a revenue increase of 75%, reaching approximately €160 million.

=== Recent developments (2022–2024) ===
Between 2022 and 2024, air up invested over €20 million in production improvements. To ensure sustainable production practices, the company has relocated its bottle manufacturing from China to Europe: The production of the tritan bottles is located in Austria, while the pods are produced in the Netherlands.

In 2023, over 10,000 sold counterfeit air up products were recorded. This led to significant revenue losses for the company – over €10 million – as some customers opted for these cheaper imitations instead of the original product.

By early 2024, however, air up had sold over 5 million bottles and achieved a tenfold increase in revenue within three years.

== Product and technology ==
The core principle behind air up is retronasal olfaction, a process where scents are detected through the nasal cavity as air is exhaled, enhancing the perception of taste. By leveraging this biological mechanism, air up creates the impression of drinking flavoured water without actually incorporating any flavours, sugars, or additives into the liquid.

The air up bottles are made from durable, BPA-free plastic or alternatively from steel. The sizes for the plastic bottles range from 650 mL to 850 mL. The bottles feature a built-in straw. The straw directs airflow through the scent pods as users drink, allowing the aromas to reach the olfactory receptors. This creates the perception of flavoured water in the brain.

Scent pods are small, interchangeable cartridges located at the top of the bottle. Each pod contains aromas from plant-based ingredients and can flavour several litres of water. The pods are made from recyclable materials and available in different flavours.

== Reception ==
In January 2022, Daniel Böniger wrote in Der Bund that the drinking bottles from air up had become a "must-have for teenagers", while questioning the price point of the bottles. Jelmer Luimstra analysed in Business Insider Nederland in 2023, that the cost for the pods per litre is on average lower than the cost for the same amount of fizzy or flavoured drinks bought in supermarkets, however, customers only save money over a longer period of time due to the initial cost of the bottle. Luimstra also said that the strength of flavour varies between the pods.

Katharina Koerth wrote in Der Spiegel in April 2022 that air up is one of the most successful startup brands in Germany. Through research into the company's practices however, Koerth commented that the website claimed that the scent pods are made from recycled materials, which upon further investigation turned out to be untrue, with company management stating that the pods have not been made from recycled materials, but from recyclable materials. The mistake on the website was acknowledged and the wording was changed shortly after. Zoe Wood of The Guardian suggested in May 2024 that air up "might keep children away from sugary drinks".

In an October 2024 article, Elisabeth Gerstendorfer of Kurier quoted Klaus Dürrschmid from the Institute of Food Sciences in Vienna. He said that air up uses only "food-grade flavours" which pose "no toxicological risk" and comply with legal standards applicable to the food and beverage industry.

Max Skowronek from Business Insider wrote in November 2024 that air up had "managed to grow from a small startup to a successful company within a few years".
