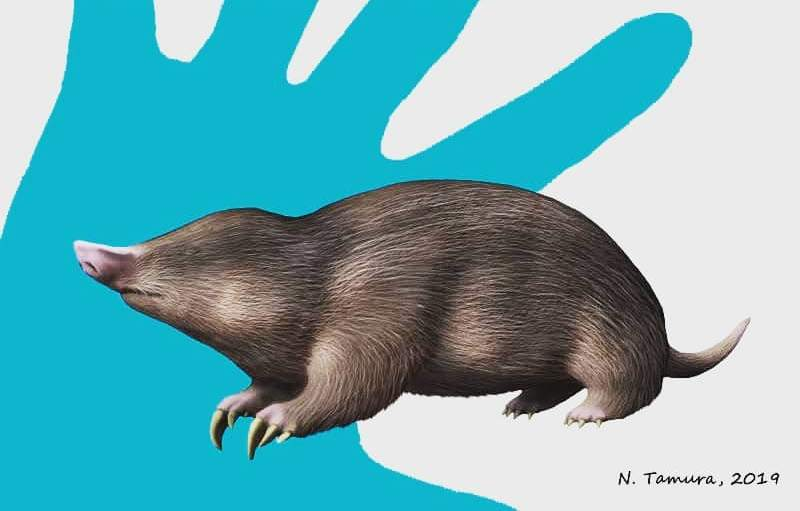
- Artist reconstruction of Xenocranium pileorivale compared to the size of a human hand.
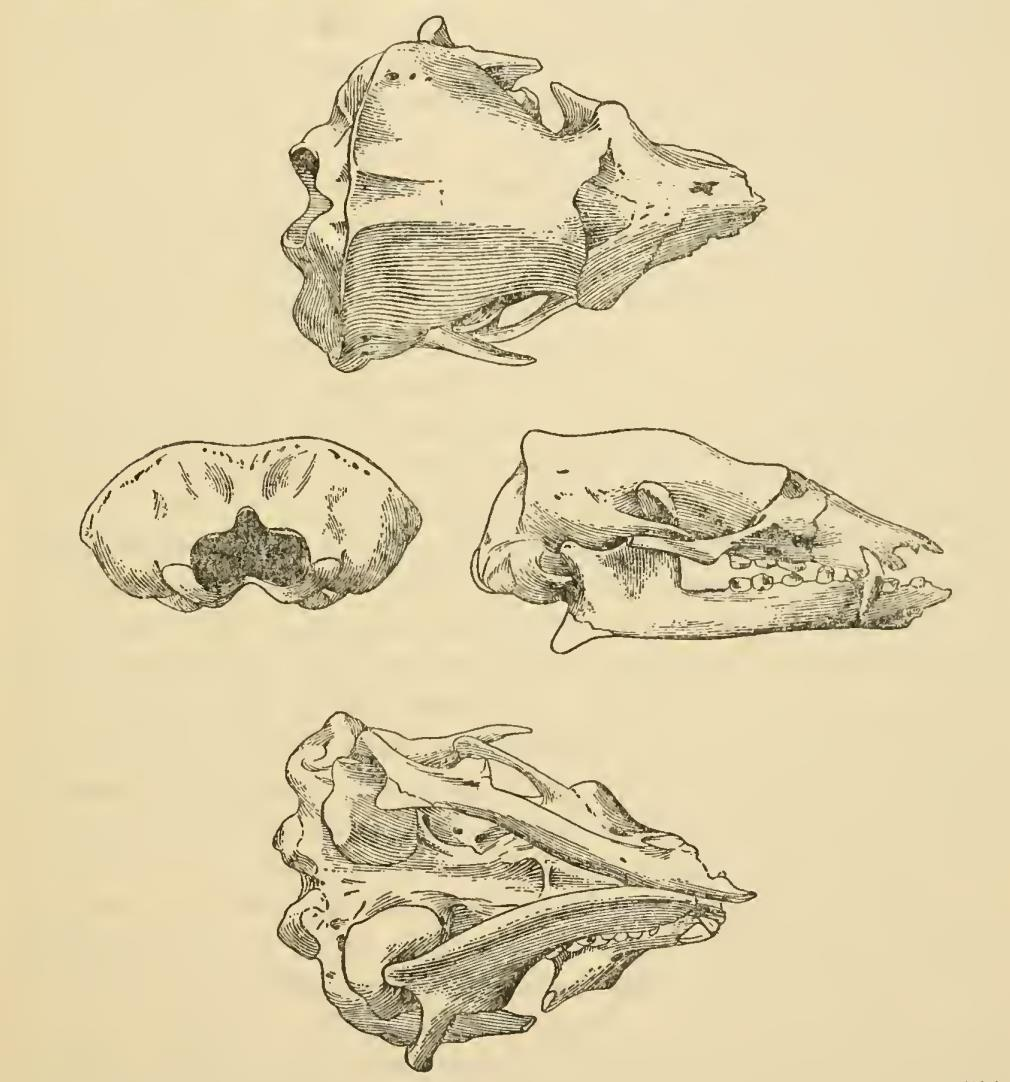
- skull of Pentapassalus pearcei

Scientific classification
- Kingdom: Animalia
- Phylum: Chordata
- Class: Mammalia
- Order: †Palaeanodonta
- Family: †Epoicotheriidae; Simpson, 1927

Type genus
- †Epoicotherium Simpson, 1927

Genera
- [see classification]

= Epoicotheriidae =

Epoicotheriidae Temporal range: 62.4–30.9 Ma middle Paleocene - early Oligocene

Extinct family of mammals

Epoicotheriidae ("strange beasts") is an extinct paraphyletic family of insectivorous placental mammals within extinct order Palaeanodonta, that lived in North America, Asia and Europe from the middle Paleocene to early Oligocene. Epoicotheriids were fossorial mammals. Late Eocene/early Oligocene genera were highly specialized animals that were convergent with the talpids, golden moles and marsupial mole in the structure of their skulls and forelimbs, and would have had a similar lifestyle as subterranean burrowers. They are considered among the most specialized animals that have ever evolved for rapid digging with the front claws. Some genera (such as Xenocranium) were remarkably convergent with modern golden moles, using a modified snout as a shovel to "swim" through shallow soil, and digging burrows through deeper or harder soils with the claws. They had poor vision, and many may have been functionally blind. Hearing was modified for low frequency sound reception, which would have allowed them to detect moving prey and the footfalls or digging activity of potential predators.

== Classification and phylogeny ==
=== Taxonomy ===
Epoicotheriidae was named by Simpson in 1927. It was assigned to the Palaeanodonta by Rose (1978) and Carroll (1988).

=== Classification ===
- Family: †Epoicotheriidae ^{(paraphyletic family)} (Simpson, 1927)
  - Genus: †Alocodontulum (Rose, 1978)
    - †Alocodontulum atopum (Rose, 1977)
  - Genus: †Amelotabes (Rose, 1978)
    - †Amelotabes simpsoni (Rose, 1978)
  - Genus: †Auroratherium (Tong & Wang, 1997)
    - †Auroratherium sinense (Tong & Wang, 1997)
  - Genus: †Dipassalus (Rose, 1991)
    - †Dipassalus oryctes (Rose, 1991)
  - Genus: †Myrmecoboides (Gidley, 1915)
    - †Myrmecoboides arenarius (Secord, 2008)
    - †Myrmecoboides montanensis (Gidley, 1915)
  - Genus: †Tubulodon (Jepsen, 1932)
    - †Tubulodon taylori (Jepsen, 1932)
  - Subfamily: †Epoicotheriinae ^{(paraphyletic subfamily)} (Simpson, 1927)
    - Genus: †Pentapassalus (Gazin, 1952)
      - †Pentapassalus pearcei (Gazin, 1952)
      - †Pentapassalus woodi (Guthrie, 1967)
    - Genus: †Tetrapassalus (Simpson, 1959)
      - †Tetrapassalus mckennai (Simpson, 1959)
      - †Tetrapassalus proius (West, 1973)
      - †Tetrapassalus sp. A [AMNH 10215] (Rose, 1978)
      - †Tetrapassalus sp. B (Robinson, 1963)
    - (unranked): †Epoicotherium/Xenocranium clade
      - Genus: †Epoicotherium (Simpson, 1927)
        - †Epoicotherium unicum (Douglass, 1905)
      - Genus: †Molaetherium (Storch & Rummel, 1999)
        - †Molaetherium heissigi (Storch & Rummel, 1999)
      - Genus: †Xenocranium (Colbert, 1942)
        - †Xenocranium pileorivale (Colbert, 1942)

== See also ==
- Mammal classification
- Palaeanodonta
