= Naraboryctes =

Naraboryctes Temporal range: Early Miocene

Scientific classification
- Kingdom: Animalia
- Phylum: Chordata
- Class: Mammalia
- Infraclass: Marsupialia
- Order: Notoryctemorphia
- Family: Notoryctidae
- Genus: †Naraboryctes; Archer et al., 2011.
- Species: †N. philcreaseri

Binomial name
- †Naraboryctes philcreaseri Archer et al., 2011.

Extinct species of marsupial

Naraboryctes philcreaseri is a fossil species of marsupial found at early Miocene deposits of Boodjamulla National Park of Riversleigh area, northwestern Queensland, Australia.

== Taxonomy ==
It was first named by Michael Archer, Robin Beck, Miranda Gott, Suzanne Hand, Henk Godthelp and Karen Black in 2011 and is the type species of genus Naraboryctes. The generic name means "to drink" (naraba in Garrawa and Waanyi languages of northwestern Queensland) in reference to its rainforest palaeohabitat + "digger" (oryctes in Greek) in reference to its fossorial specializations and close relationship to the extant species of genus Notoryctes. The specific epithet honors Phil Creaser, and is referred to as "Phil Creaser's Drinking Digger".

The genus is allied to the family of modern 'marsupial moles', Notoryctidae, two or three species of the extant genus Notoryctes. However, a more recent study showscases that it lacked many of the synapomorphies associated with marsupial moles, and may belong to a previously unknown lineage of metatherians. Researchers working to resolve the phylogeny have placed the taxon in a unique order of Mammalia as Notoryctemorphia.

== Description ==
Naraboryctes philcreaseri describes an animal known from specimens of fossil material that includes fragments of maxillary and jaw bones and teeth. The recognised fossil specimens also some post-cranial skeletal remains. N. philcreaseri is regarded as a transitional fossil of mammal, with evidence of characteristics suited to foraging or inhabiting a subterranean environ with the dominating rainforest. The weight is estimated to have been approximately 200 grams. The diet is presumed to resemble the modern marsupial mole, which is insectivorous.

== Distribution ==
Naraboryctes philcreaseri is a species of the Riversleigh fauna, discovered at three locations— Camel Sputum Site, Upper Site, Wayne's Wok Site—in the Riversleigh World Heritage Area and dated to the early Miocene (Faunal Zone B, circa 23-16 million years ago); the type locality is Upper Site on Godthelp hill. The Riversleigh area in this period was a permanently wet and closed canopy rainforest environment, a stark contrast to the central deserts of Australia favoured by their sand-swimming modern descendants.

The species is the earliest discovery of the family's ancestral lineage.
