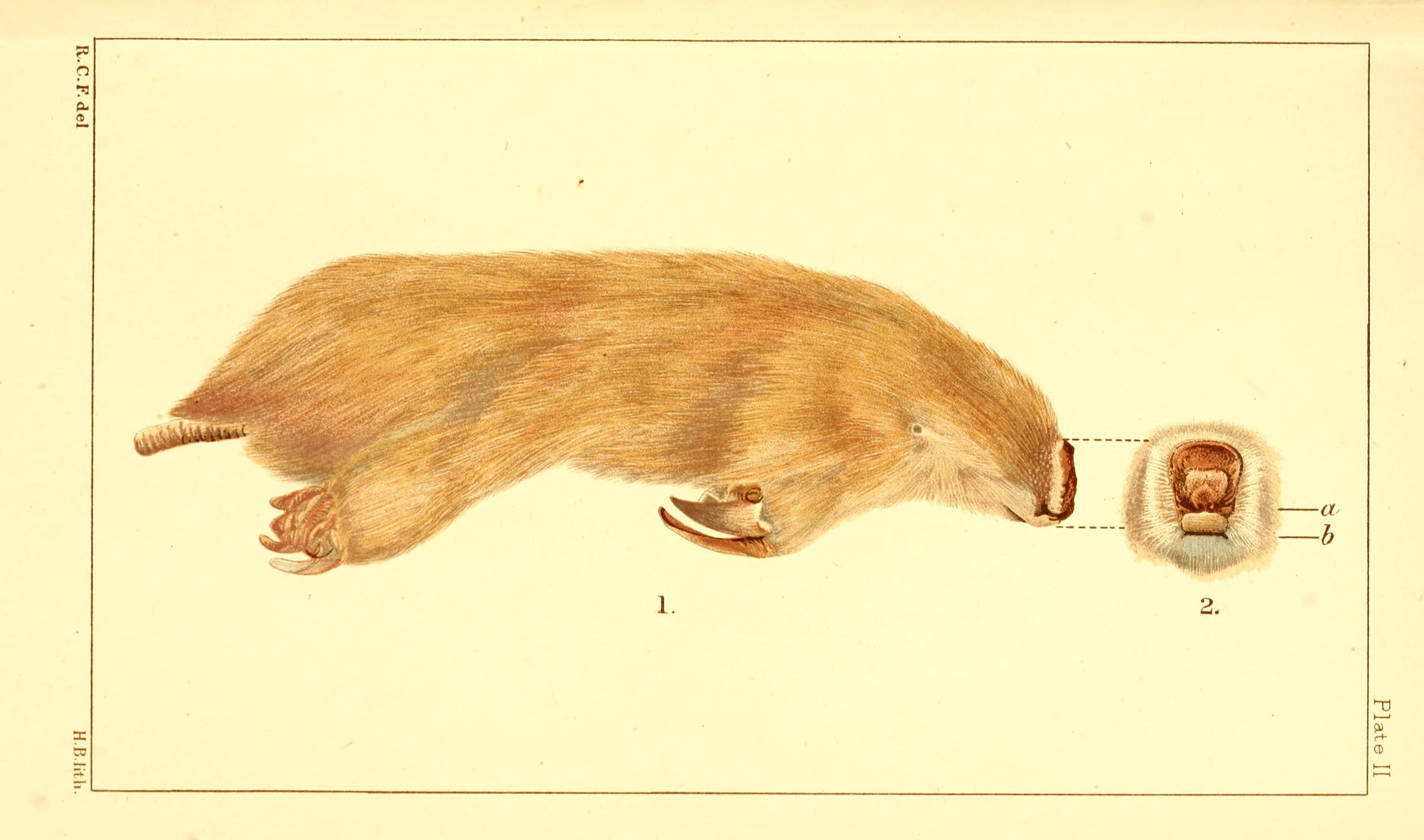

Conservation status
- Least Concern (IUCN 3.1)

Scientific classification
- Kingdom: Animalia
- Phylum: Chordata
- Class: Mammalia
- Infraclass: Marsupialia
- Order: Notoryctemorphia
- Family: Notoryctidae
- Genus: Notoryctes
- Species: N. typhlops

Binomial name
- Notoryctes typhlops Stirling, 1889.
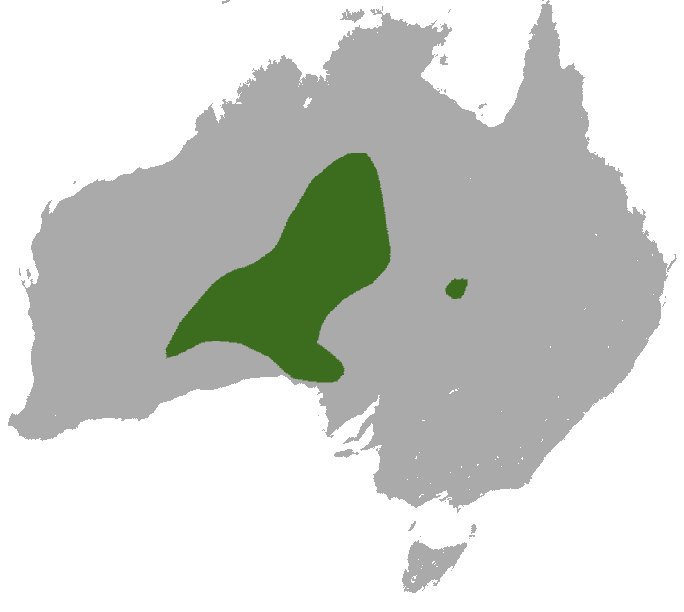
- Southern marsupial mole range

= Southern marsupial mole =

Species of marsupial

The southern marsupial mole (Notoryctes typhlops), also known as the itjaritjari (pronounced [ˈɪɟɐrɪɟɐrɪ]) or itjari-itjari, is a mole-like marsupial found in the western central deserts of Australia. It is extremely adapted to a burrowing way of life. It has large, shovel-like forepaws and silky fur, which helps it move easily. It also lacks complete eyes as it has little need for them. It feeds on earthworms and larvae.

== History of discovery ==
Although the southern marsupial mole was probably known by Aboriginal Australians for thousands of years, the first specimen examined by the scientific community was collected in 1888. Stockman W. Coulthard made the discovery on Idracowra Pastoral Lease in the Northern Territory by following some unusual prints that led him to the animal lying under a tussock. Not knowing what to do with the strange creature, he wrapped it in a kerosene soaked rag, placed it in a revolver cartridge box and forwarded it to E. C. Stirling, the Director of the South Australian Museum. Due to the poor transportation conditions of the time, the specimen reached its destination in a badly decomposed state. Hence, Stirling was unable to find any evidence of the pouch or epipubic bones and decided the creature was not a marsupial.

Nineteenth century scientists believed that marsupials and eutherians had evolved from the same primitive ancestor and were looking for a living specimen that would serve as the missing link. Because the marsupial mole closely resembled the golden moles of Africa, some scientists concluded that the two were related and that they had found the proof. This, however, is not the case, as became obvious by examining better-preserved specimens that had a marsupial pouch. The striking similarities of the two species are, in fact, the result of convergent evolution.

== Taxonomy and phylogeny ==
Although the family Notoryctidae is poorly represented in the fossil record there is evidence of at least one distinct genus Naraboryctes, in the early Miocene sediments in the Riversleigh deposit in northern Australia.

Due to their highly specialized morphology and the fact that notoryctids share many common characteristics with other marsupials, there has been much debate surrounding their phylogeny. However, recent molecular studies indicate that notoryctids are not closely related to any of the other marsupial families and should be placed in an order of their own, Notoryctemorphia.

Furthermore, molecular data suggests that Notoryctemorphia separated from other marsupials around 64 million years ago. Although at this time South America, Antarctica and Australia were still joined the order evolved in Australia for at least 40-50 million years. The Riversleigh fossil material suggests that Notoryctes was already well adapted for burrowing and probably lived in the rainforest that covered much of Australia at that time. The increase in aridity at the end of Tertiary was likely one of the key contributing factors to the development of the current highly specialized form of marsupial mole. The marsupial mole had been burrowing long before the Australian deserts came into being.

== Morphology ==
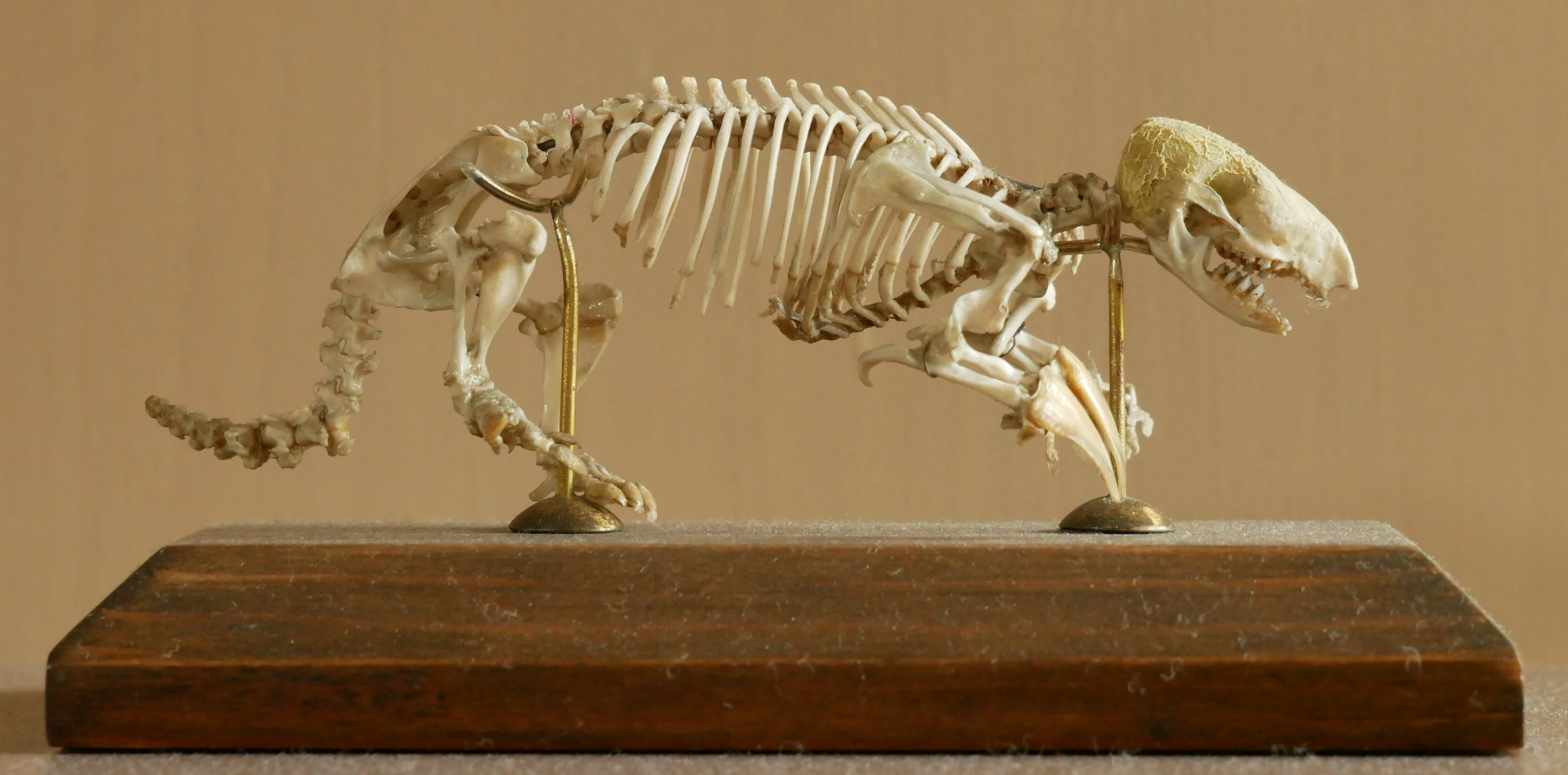
Notoryctes typhlops skeleton

The southern marsupial mole is small in size, with a head and body length of 121–159 mm (4.8–6.3 in), a tail length of 21–26 mm (0.83–1.02 in) and a weight of 40–70 g (1.4–2.5 oz). The body is covered with short, dense, silky fur with a pale cream to white color often tinted by the iron oxides from the soil which gives it a reddish chestnut brown tint. It has a light brownish pink nose and mouth and no vibrissae.

The cone shaped head merges directly with the body, and there is no obvious neck region. The limbs are short and powerful, and digits III and IV of the manus have large spade-like claws. The dentition varies with individuals and, because the molars have a root of only one third of the length, it has been assumed that moles cannot deal with hard food substances. The dorsal surface of the rostrum and the back of the tail have no fur and the skin is heavily keratinized. There is no external evidence of the eyes, and the optic nerve is absent. It does, however, have a pigment layer where the eyes should be, probably a vestige of the retina. Both lachrymal glands and Jacobson's organ are well developed, and it has been suggested that the former plays a role in lubricating the nasal passages and Jacobson's organ.

The external ear openings are covered with fur and do not have pinnae. The nostrils are small vertical slits right below the shield-like rostrum. Although the brain has been regarded as very primitive and represents the "lowliest marsupial brain", the olfactory bulbs and the tubercula olfactoria are very well developed. This seems to suggest that the olfactory sense plays an important role in the marsupial mole's life, as it would be expected for a creature living in an environment lacking visual stimuli. The middle ear seems to be adapted for the reception of low-frequency sounds.

=== Adaptations ===
In an example of convergent evolution, the southern marsupial mole resembles the Namib Desert golden mole (Eremitalpa granti namibensis) and other specialised fossorial animals in having a low and unstable body temperature, ranging between 15–30 °C (59–86 °F). It does not have an unusually low resting metabolic rate, and the metabolic rate of burrowing is 60 times higher than that of walking or running. Because it lives underground, where the temperature is considerably lower than at the surface, the southern marsupial mole does not seem to have any special adaptations to desert life. It is not known whether it drinks water or not, but due to the irregularity of rainfall it is assumed that it does not.

== Habitat and distribution ==
The habitat of the southern marsupial mole is not well known, and is generally based on scattered records. It has been often recorded in sandy dunes or flats, usually where spinifex is present. Its habitat seems to be restricted to areas where the sand is soft, as it cannot tunnel through harder materials. Although little is known about its exact distribution, sightings, aboriginal informants and museum records indicate that it lives in the central sandy desert regions of Western Australia, northern South Australia and the Northern Territory. Recent studies indicate that its habitat also includes Great Victoria and Gibson Deserts.

== Behavior ==
Due to the lack of any field studies regarding the marsupial moles, there is little known about their behavior. Observations of captive animals are limited since most of the moles do not survive much longer than a month after capture.

=== Surface behavior ===
It sometimes wanders above the surface where traces of several animals have been found. While most evidence indicates that it does this seldom and moves just a few meters before burrowing back underground, on some occasions multiple tracks were found suggesting that one or more animals have moved above ground for several hours. According to Aboriginal sources, marsupial moles may surface at any time of day, but seem to prefer to do so after rain and in the cooler season.

Captive animals have been observed to feed above ground and then return underground to sleep. Occasionally it has been recorded to suddenly "faint" on the surface without waking up for several hours until disturbed.

Above the ground it moves in a sinuous fashion, using its powerful forelimbs to haul the body over the surface and its hind limbs to push forward. The forelimbs are extended forward in unison with the opposite hind limb. Moles move about the surface with frantic haste but little speed, as one observer once likened it to a "Volkswagen Beetle heaving its way through the sand".

=== Burrowing behavior ===
While burrowing, the southern marsupial mole does not make permanent tunnels, but the sand caves in and tunnels back-fill as the animal moves along. For this reason its burrowing style has been compared to "swimming through the sand". The only way its tunnels can be identified is as a small oval shape of loose sand. Although it spends most of its active time 20 to 100 centimetres (8 to 39 in) below the surface, tunneling horizontally or at shallow angles, it sometimes for no apparent reason turns suddenly and burrows vertically to depths of up to 2.5 metres or 8.2 feet.

Although most food sources are likely to occur at depths of approximately 50 centimetres or 20 inches from the surface, the temperature of these environments varies greatly from less than 15 °C (59 °F) during winter to over 35 °C (95 °F) during summer. While one of the captive moles was observed shivering when the temperature dropped under 16 °C (60.8 °F), it seems probable that moles can select the temperature of their environment by burrowing at different depths.

=== Diet ===
Little is known about the southern marsupial mole's diet, and all information is based on the gut content of preserved animals and on observations made on captive specimens. All evidence seems to suggest that the mole is mainly insectivorous, preferring insect eggs, larvae and pupae to the adults. Based on observations made on captive animals, it seems that one of the favorite food choices was beetle larvae, especially Scarabaeidae. Because burrowing requires high energy expenditure it seems unlikely that the mole searches for its food in this prey impoverished environment, and suggests that it probably feeds within nests. It has been also recorded to eat adult insects, seeds and lizards. Below the desert sands of Australia, the marsupial mole searches for burrowing insects and small reptiles. Instead of building a tunnel, it "swims" through the ground, allowing the sand to collapse behind it.

=== Social behavior ===
There is little known about the social and reproductive behavior of these animals, but all evidence seems to suggest that it leads a solitary life. There are no traces of large burrows where more than one individual might meet and communicate. Although it is not known how the male locates the female, it is assumed that they do so using their highly developed olfactory sense.

The fact that the middle ear seems to be morphologically suited for capturing low frequency sounds, and that moles produce high pitched vocalizations when handled, indicates that this kind of sound that propagates more easily underground may be used as a form of communication.

== Human interactions ==
The southern marsupial mole was known for thousands of years to Australia's Indigenous people and was part of their mythology. It was associated with certain sites and dreaming trails such as Uluru and the Anangu-Pitjantjatjara Lands. They were regarded with sympathy, probably due to its harmless nature, and were only eaten during hard times. Aboriginal people have good tracking skills and generally cooperate with researchers in teaching them these skills and help finding specimens. Their involvement is instrumental in gathering information about the species' habitat and behavior.

Historical records suggest that the southern marsupial mole was relatively common in the late 19th century and early 20th century. There was a large trade in marsupial mole skins in the Finke River region between 1900 and 1920. Large numbers of aborigines arrived at the trading post with 5-6 pelts each for sale to trade for food and other commodities. It is estimated that hundreds to several thousand skins were traded at these meetings, and that at the time the mole was relatively common.

=== Conservation status ===
So little is known about the southern marsupial mole that it is difficult to assess its exact distribution and how it varied over the last decades. However circumstantial evidence suggests that their numbers are dwindling. Although the decreasing acquisition rate is difficult to interpret due to the chance nature of the findings, there are reasons for concern. About 90% of medium-sized marsupials in arid Australia have become threatened due to cat and fox predation. A recent study indicates that remains of marsupial moles have been found in 5% of the cats and foxes faecal pellets examined. Moles are also sensitive to changes in the availability of their food caused by changing fire regimes and the impact of herbivores. The southern marsupial mole is currently listed as endangered by the IUCN. Efforts to protect this species focus on advocating for maintaining a healthy population of moles to better understand their biology and behavior, and for conducting field studies to monitor the species distribution and abundance with the help of Aboriginal Australians.
