= Scent transfer unit =

Evidence collection device used by law enforcement

A scent transfer unit is a vacuum device used to collect scent evidence from a crime scene or item of evidence. The unit was invented by Bill Tolhurst (a former president of the National Police Bloodhound Association) while working for the Niagara County Sheriff's Department. Several law enforcement agencies have bought scent transfer units.

The device works by vacuuming an odour from a desired object onto a sterile gauze pad placed over the air intake. The resulting scent pads can either be given to a tracking dog, used in a 'scent lineup', or preserved in a freezer. Tolhurst has claimed that evidence pads can be stored successfully in a frozen state for more than 11 years.

Although the reliability of scent evidence in general has been called into question, certain experiments have demonstrated successful use of scent transfer units.

The Scent Transfer unit has undergone rigorous scientific testing including at Oak Ridge National Laboratory. It has been upheld on appeal in both State and Federal Courts in the 9th circuit as reliable scientific equipment. There are currently more than 400 units being used by Federal, State and Local law enforcement handlers across the US and abroad.
