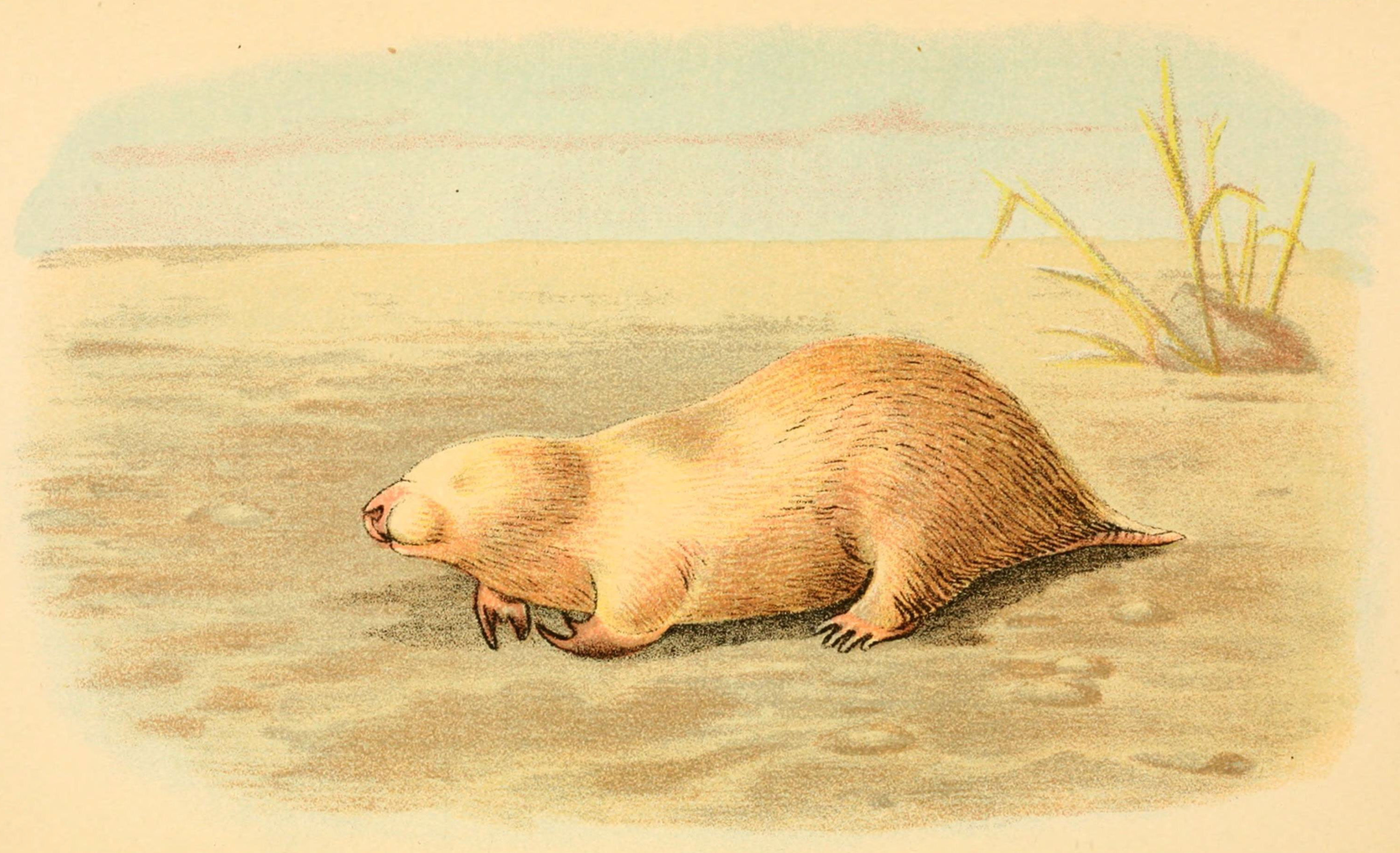
- Southern marsupial mole

Scientific classification
- Kingdom: Animalia
- Phylum: Chordata
- Class: Mammalia
- Infraclass: Marsupialia
- Order: Notoryctemorphia
- Family: Notoryctidae
- Genus: Notoryctes; Stirling, 1891

Type species
- Psammoryctes typhlops Stirling, 1889

Species
- Notoryctes typhlops Stirling, 1891; Notoryctes caurinus Thomas, 1920
- Ranges of the two species

= Marsupial mole =

Marsupial moles Temporal range: 20–0 Ma Miocene to Recent

Genus of marsupials

Marsupial moles, from the genus Notoryctes (/noʊtəˈrɪktəz/; from Ancient Greek νότος (nótos), meaning "south", and ὀρυκτήρ (oruktḗs), meaning "digger") are two species of highly specialised marsupial mammals that are found in the Australian interior. They are small burrowing marsupials that anatomically converge on fossorial placental mammals, such as extant golden moles (Chrysochloridae) and extinct epoicotheres. The species are:

- Notoryctes typhlops (southern marsupial mole, known as the itjaritjari by the Pitjantjatjara and Yankunytjatjara people in Central Australia)
- Notoryctes caurinus (northern marsupial mole, also known as the kakarratul)

== Characteristics ==
In an example of convergent evolution, notoryctids resemble (and fill the ecological niche of) the talpid or true moles from North America and Eurasia and the Chrysochloridae or golden moles from Southern Africa. Like chrysochlorids and epoicotheres, notoryctids use their forelimbs and enlarged central claws to dig in a parasagittal (i.e., up and down) plane, as opposed to the "lateral scratch" style of digging that characterises talpid moles.

Marsupial moles spend most of their time underground, coming to the surface only occasionally, probably mostly after rains. They are functionally blind, their eyes having become reduced to vestigial lenses under the skin that lack a pupil. They have no external ears, just a pair of tiny holes hidden under thick hair. The head is cone-shaped, with a leathery shield over the muzzle, the body is tubular, and the tail is a short, bald stub encased in leathery skin. They are between 12 and 16 centimetres (4.7–6.3 in) long, weigh 40 to 60 grams (1.4–2.1 oz), and are uniformly covered in fairly short, very fine pale cream to white hair with an iridescent golden sheen. Their pouch is small but well developed and has evolved to face backwards so it does not fill with sand. It contains just two teats, so the animal cannot support more than two young at a time. They are the only marsupials with a true cloaca.

The limbs are very short, with reduced digits. The forefeet have two greatly enlarged, spade shaped, flat claws on the third and fourth digits, which are used to excavate soil in front of the animal. The hindfeet are flattened, and bear three small claws; these feet are used to push soil behind the animal as it digs. Epipubic bones are present but small and as in some other fossorial mammals (e.g., armadillos), the last five cervical vertebrae are fused, giving the head greater rigidity during digging. The animal swims through the soil and does not leave behind a permanent burrow.

The teeth of the marsupial moles are degenerate and bear no resemblance to polyprotodont or diprotodont teeth. Their dental formula varies, but is usually somewhere near 4–3.1.2.43.1.3.4 × 2 = 42–44. The upper molar teeth are triangular and zalambdodont, i.e., resembling an inverted Greek letter lambda in occlusal view, and the lower molars appear to have lost their talonid basins. Marsupial moles are the only marsupials that are testicond.

== Fossil record ==
Notoryctids are represented by early Miocene fossils of Naraboryctes from Riversleigh in Queensland, Australia, which show the mosaic acquisition of dental and skeletal features of the living Notoryctes from a more surface-dwelling ancestor. The notoryctid fossil record demonstrates that the primary cusp of the molars is the metacone, distinct from the paracone characteristic of zalambdodont tenrecs, golden moles, and Solenodon. Regarding the number of teeth in each dental quadrant (or dental formula), the fossil record demonstrates polymorphism of tooth number, both between specimens and within the same specimen. Nonetheless, older studies concluded there are four molars (typical for marsupials) in each quadrant both in living Notoryctes and the fossil notoryctid Naraboryctes.

== Evolutionary affinities ==
American paleontologist William King Gregory wrote that "Notoryctes is a true marsupial" and this view has been repeatedly verified by phylogenetic analyses of comparative anatomy, mitochondrial DNA, nuclear DNA, rare genomic events, and combined datasets of nuclear and mitochondrial DNA and morphology and DNA. The largest phylogenetic datasets strongly support the placement of Notoryctes as the sister taxon to a dasyuromorph-peramelian clade, within the Australidelphian radiation.
