= McManus =

McManus is an Irish surname. It is derived from the Irish Gaelic "Mac Mághnais", in modern Irish "McMaghnuis" which means "Son of Magnus". Its earlier origin is from the Latin "magnus", meaning "great". The Normans used it to honour Charlemagne (742–814), as Carolus Magnus (Charles the Great). Variant spellings of the name include MacManus, Manus and MacManners. The English form, Moyne, is also found in Ulster. In Scotland it is a sept of Clan Colquhoun.

There are two principal septs of the name in Ireland:

- One descends from Maghnus (died 1181), son of Turlough Mór O'Conor, High King of Ireland (1119–1156); this branch belonged to Kilronan in the county of Roscommon in the province of Connacht.
- The second sept was a branch of the Maguires, who descend from Magnus, son of Donn Maguire (Donn Mag Uidhir), Chief of the Kingdom of Fermanagh (died 1302). This family lived on the shores of Lough Erne, in what is now County Fermanagh.

== People ==
- Abbie McManus (born 1993), English footballer
- Alan McManus (born 1971), Scottish snooker player
- Alex McManus, American musician
- Allan McManus (born 1974), Scottish footballer
- Brandon McManus (born 1991), American football placekicker
- Daniel McManus (born 2003), Scottish footballer
- Danny McManus (born 1965), American and Canadian football quarterback
- Declan McManus (born 1994), Scottish footballer
- Doyle McManus (born c. 1952), American journalist
- Edward Joseph McManus (1920–2017), American politician and jurist
- Emily Julian McManus (1865–1918), Canadian poet, author and educator
- Erwin McManus (born 1958), lead pastor of Mosaic Church of the emerging church movement
- Frank McManus (disambiguation)
- George McManus (disambiguation)
- Gerard McManus (born 1960), Australian journalist
- Heather Ross-McManus (born 1973), Canadian trampoline gymnast
- J. F. A. McManus (1911–1980), Canadian pathologist
- J. P. McManus (born 1951), Irish businessman and racehorse owner
- James McManus (disambiguation), also James and Jim
- Jane Cazneau (1807–1878), née McManus, American journalist
- Jason McManus (1934–2019) American journalist
- John McManus (disambiguation)
- Karen McManus (born 1969), American author
- Liz McManus (born 1947), Irish politician
- Louis McManus (1898–1968), American television engineer, film editor and designer
- Mark McManus (1935–1994), Scottish actor best known in Taggart
- Martin McManus (politician), (born 1967) Australian politician
- Marty McManus (1900–1966), American Major League Baseball player
- Michael McManus (disambiguation)
- Michaela McManus (born 1983), American actress
- Michelle McManus (born 1980), Scottish singer
- Michelle McManus (politician) (born 1966), member of the Michigan Senate
- Mick McManus (footballer) (born 1954), Scottish footballer
- Mick McManus (wrestler) (1920–2013), English professional wrestler born William George Matthews
- Patrick McManus (disambiguation), including Pat
- Peter McManus (1829–1859), Irish recipient of the Victoria Cross
- Rove McManus (born 1974), Australian variety show host, comedian, and owner of Roving Enterprises
- Sammy McManus (1911–1976), Irish-Canadian professional ice hockey player
- Sara McManus (born 1991), Swedish curler
- Sara McManus (field hockey) (born 1993), Canadian field hockey player
- Sean McManus (disambiguation)
- Shaun McManus (born 1976), Australian rules footballer
- Shawn McManus (born 1958), American artist
- Stephen McManus (born 1982), Scottish football coach and former player
- Steve McManus (born 1970), former member of the band Darling Violetta
- Thomas McManus (disambiguation)
- Tony McManus (disambiguation)
- William McManus (1780–1835), U.S. Congressman from New York

== Fictional characters ==
- Tim McManus, from the TV series Oz
- Connor and Murphy McManus, from the 1999 movie, The Boondock Saints.

== See also ==
- McManus Galleries, Gothic Revival-style building with a museum and art gallery
- MacManus
