= Mick McManus =

Mick McManus is the name of:

- Mick McManus (footballer) (born 1954), Scottish footballer
- Mick McManus (wrestler) (1920–2013), English professional wrestler born William George Matthews

== See also ==
- Michael McManus (disambiguation)
- Mike McManus (columnist) (born 1942), American columnist
