= Manis (disambiguation) =

Manis is a genus of pangolins.

Manis may also refer to:

- Manis (given name)
- Manis (surname)
- Manis (orangutan) (fl. 1978), film performer
- Manis Mastodon site
- Manis palaeojavanica, an extinct species of pangolin
- Apristurus manis (ghost catshark)
- Belimbing manis (Averrhoa carambola), a tree which produces starfruit in Indonesia and Malaysia

== See also ==
- Mannes School of Music
- Mannes, surnames and given names
- Manus (disambiguation)
