= Manus =

Manus may refer to:

== Relating to locations around New Guinea ==
- Manus Island, a Papua New Guinean island in the Admiralty Archipelago
  - Manus languages, languages spoken on Manus and islands close by
  - Manus Regional Processing Centre, an offshore Australian immigration detention facility on Manus Island
    - Manus, 2017 play by Nazanin Sahamizadeh
    - Manus, 2019 short documentary film about asylum seekers in the detention centre, made by Angus McDonald
- Manus Plate, a tiny tectonic plate northeast of New Guinea
- Manus Province, a province of Papua New Guinea encompassing several islands, including Manus Island
  - Manus District, the only district of Manus Province

== People ==
=== First name ===
- Manuş Baba (born 1986), Turkish singer
- Manus Boonjumnong (born 1980), Thai Olympic medalist
- Manus Boyle (Gaelic footballer) (born c. 1965/6), Irish Gaelic footballer
- Manus Canning (died 2018), Irish politician and paramilitary
- Manus Kelly (1978–2019), Irish businessman and rally driver
- Manus Lunny (born 1962), Irish musician
- Manus MacCloskey (1874–1963), American military officer
- Manus McGuire, Irish fiddle player
- Manus O'Cahan, leader of the 17th-century Manus O'Cahan's Regiment
- Manus O'Donnell (died 1737), Irish nobleman and soldier
- Manus O'Donnell (died 1564), Irish nobleman
- Manus Patten (1902–1977), Irish police officer
- Daniel Pinkwater (born 1941 as Manus Pinkwater), American children's author

=== Surname ===
- Dirk Manus, fictional smuggler among human characters of The Transformers franchise
- Henry Manus (1851–1931), Dutch philatelist
- Max Manus (1914–1996), Norwegian resistance fighter during World War II
- Patrick Mac Manus (1944–2011), political activist
- Rosa Manus (1881–1942), Dutch pacifist and suffragist
- Tikken Manus (1914–2010), member of the Norwegian resistance during World War II
- Willard Manus (born 1930), American novelist

== Fictional characters ==
- Manus, Father of the Abyss, in action role-playing game Dark Souls: Artorias of the Abyss

== Other uses ==
- Manus (AI agent), artificial intelligence agent
- Manus (anatomy), the zoological term for the distal portion of the forelimb of an animal (including the human hand)
- Manus language (Indonesia), an Austronesian language spoken on the island of Flores, Indonesia
- Manus marriage, a type of marriage during Roman times

== See also ==
- MacManus
- McManus
- Magnus (disambiguation)
- Manas (disambiguation)
- Manis (disambiguation)
- Manu (disambiguation)
- Manushya, human beings in Sanskrit
