= International Organization for the Family =

The International Organization for the Family is a socially conservative U.S. think-tank and advocacy group that opposes abortion, divorce, and homosexuality, promoting instead the "child-rich, married parent" family.

== History ==
The Center traces its origins back to 1976, when John A. Howard, President of Rockford College formed the Rockford College Institute. This group later became the Rockford Institute.

In 1997 Howard and Allan C. Carlson broke from the Rockford Institute to found the Howard Center for Family, Religion and Society. It incorporated the previous Center on Religion and Society, and took over publication of both The Religion and Society Report and The Family In America.

In 1997 it created and coordinates the World Congress of Families, a group known for its involvement with the 2013 Russian LGBT propaganda law and opposing LGBT rights internationally.

In 2016, Brian S. Brown, president of the National Organization for Marriage, became president of the Howard Center and changed its name to the International Organization for the Family (IOF). BuzzFeed News reported that Brown had "taken over" the World Congress of Families earlier that year, as "part of positioning the group as a more muscular advocacy group", and Political Research Associates later described the Howard Center as having rebranded itself as IOF under Brown's leadership. In the launch announcement, Brown described IOF as an expansion of the Howard Center's work and said that the World Congress of Families would remain a key project.

IRS filings show a corresponding change in the organization's governance. In 2015 and 2016, filings listed several long-time Howard Center figures as board members, including Allan C. Carlson, Janice Shaw Crouse, Earl Clark, Lisa Gibson, Caryl Crahan, William Andrews, Wayne Tew, Stanford Swim, and David Peterson. By 2018, Brian S. Brown was listed as both president and chairman. By 2019, the filings reflected a smaller and distinct governing board, reporting five voting members while naming only four — Ignacio Arsuaga, Vicente Segú Marcos, Alexey Komov, and Luca Volonte. In 2024, Komov, who is a close ally of Russian oligarch Konstantin Malofeev, was indicted on U.S. sanctions-related charges. Volontè has also been involved in corruption proceedings connected to the Council of Europe's "Caviar Diplomacy" scandal.

Later filings list the same tax-exempt entity under the name International Organization for the Family, with the Howard Center for Family, Religion, and Society retained as an alternate or doing-business-as name.

== Controversies ==
In January 2012, Robert W. Patterson resigned from his job as an aide in Pennsylvania's Department of Public Welfare after Governor Tom Corbett's administration rejected a request to allow him to continue as editor of the Howard Center's journal, The Family in America. His column had proposed that "birth-control pills suppress women's sexual pleasure" and suggested "condom use deprives women of "remarkable chemicals" in semen that elevate their mood and self-esteem."

In November 2013, Senator Mark Kirk (R-IL) denied a meeting hosted by the Howard Center and the World Congress of Families access to a Senate meeting room. The meeting eventually went on as scheduled after House Speaker John Boehner (R-OH) intervened.
