= Magnum =

Magnum is a Latin word meaning "great".

Magnum may also refer to:

== Businesses and organizations ==
- Magnum Research, a firearms maker
- Magnum Semiconductor, a spin-off of Cirrus Logic
- Magnum Photos, a photojournalist cooperative
- Magnum Berhad, a Malaysian gaming company
- The Magnum Ice Cream Company, an ice cream manufacturer

== Art and entertainment ==
=== Music ===
- Jeff Magnum, former bassist of the Dead Boys
- Magnum (band), English rock band
- Magnum (band), Latin-tinged Southern California funk band Magnum, first album "Fully Loaded" (1974)
- Magnum (musician) (born 1973), stage name of Sami Wolking
- Magnum Force (album), the second album from hip hop duo Heltah Skeltah

=== Other uses in arts and entertainment ===
- Magnum, a fictional character and commander of the Autobots
- Magnum, a member of the Elementals in Marvel Comics
- Magnum, P.I., a 1980s American crime drama television series
  - Thomas Magnum, the lead character
  - Magnum P.I. (2018 TV series), its reboot
- Magnum Force, the 2nd of five Dirty Harry movies, starring Clint Eastwood as San Francisco policeman, Harry Callahan. The title refers to Harry's use of a .44 Magnum gun.
- Magnum T. A. (born 1959), ring name of professional wrestler Terry Wayne Allen
- Magnum XL-200, a roller coaster at Cedar Point
- Moses Magnum, a Marvel Comics villain

== In science and technology ==
=== Vehicles ===
- Chevrolet Optra Magnum, a compact car
- Chrysler Magnum engines, a line of engines used in various cars produced by Chrysler Corporation
- Dodge Magnum, a nameplate used for various automobiles produced by Dodge
- Mitsubishi Magnum, a pickup truck
- MV Magnum, a 1979 Cambodian cargo ship
- O'Neill Magnum, also known as Magnum Jake and Magnum Pickup, an airplane
- Rayton-Fissore Magnum, an Italian luxury SUV
- TES 28 Magnam, a Polish sailboat design
- Renault Magnum, a heavy-duty truck
- Vauxhall Magnum, a small family car
- Yakovlev Yak-30 (1960), a Soviet military trainer aircraft

=== Other uses in science and technology ===
- Os magnum or capitate bone, the largest of the carpal bones in the human hand
- Magnum (rocket), a rocket designed by NASA during the 1990s
- Magnum (satellite), a class of U.S. reconnaissance satellite
- Foramen magnum, a large opening in the occipital bone of the cranium
- Magnum cartridge, a type of firearms cartridge
- MIPS Magnum, a type of computer workstation
- Multicolor Active Galactic Nuclei Monitoring, a telescope in Hawaii

== Other products ==
- Magnum (condom), a brand of condom manufactured by Trojan
- Magnum (ice cream), a brand of ice cream owned by The Magnum Ice Cream Company
- Magnum (unit), a 1.5-litre bottle for wine and champagne
- Magnum, a 1.5-litre size of wine bottle
- Magnum hops, used in the brewing of beer
- Sharpie (marker) Magnum, a large permanent marker
- Magnum engine, a line of Chrysler internal combustion engines
- Magnum, a series of pistol ammunition types

== People ==
- H Magnum, French rapper originating from the Ivory Coast
- Magnum Membrere (born 1982), Filipino basketball player
- Magnum (footballer) (born 1982), Magnum Rafael Farias Tavares, Brazilian football attacking midfielder
- Magnum Rolle (born 1986), Bahamian basketball player
- Magnum Tokyo (born 1973), Japanese professional wrestler
- Willie Person Mangum (1792-1861), American politician
- Zhang Weili, nickname Magnum, Chinese mixed martial artist

== Other uses ==
- DXMR-FM (also known as 99.9 Magnum Radyo), an FM radio station in Cagayan de Oro, Philippines
- Magnum, NATO code for an AGM-88 or anti-radiation missile launch
- "Magnum opus", a work or art considered the greatest work of a person's career or a work of outstanding skill
- Magnum opus (alchemy), the creation of the philosopher's stone

== See also ==
- O magnum mysterium, a Christian liturgical chant
- Magna (disambiguation)
- Magnus (disambiguation)
- Magnum opus (disambiguation)
