= Magness =

Magness may refer to:

- Magness (surname)
- Magness, Arkansas, a town in Independence County, Arkansas, United States

== See also ==
- Magness Arena, a sports arena in Denver, Colorado, United States
- Magnes (disambiguation)
