= Jack McManus =

Jack McManus may refer to:

- Jack McManus (gangster)
- Jack McManus (singer)
- Jack McManus (ice hockey)

== See also ==
- John McManus (disambiguation)
