= Brian S. Brown =

American activist (born 1974)

Brian Brown
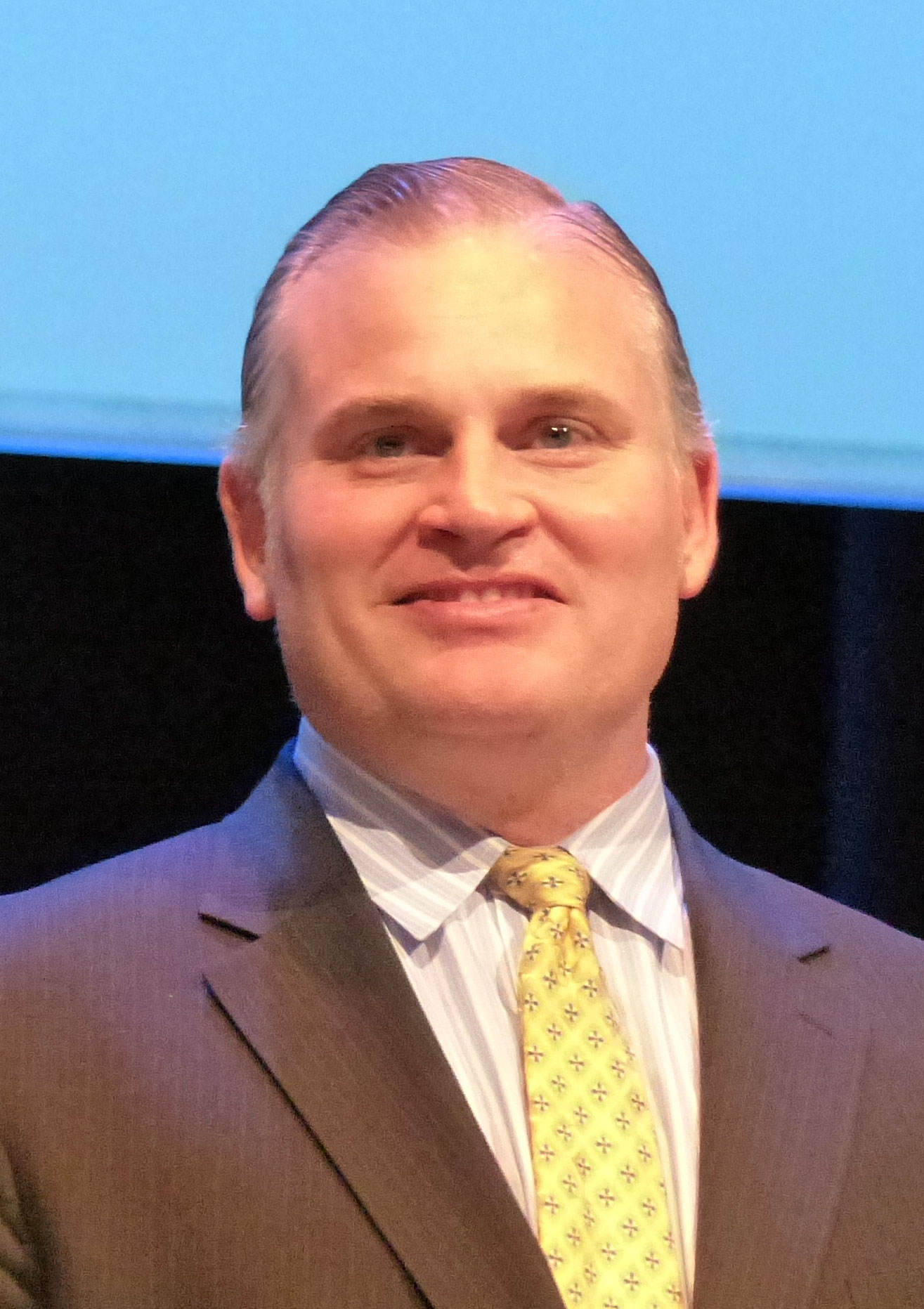
- Brown in 2017
- Born: Brian Stephen Brown c. 1974 (age 51–52); Whittier, California, U.S.
- Education: Whittier College (BA); University of Oxford (BA); University of California, Los Angeles (MA)
- Occupation: Activist
- Organization: National Organization for Marriage
- Spouse: Susan Brown
- Children: 9

Brian Stephen Brown (born c. 1974) is an American activist who co-founded the National Organization for Marriage (NOM), and has served as its president since 2010, having previously served as executive director.

Brown is also president of the World Congress of Families.

== Career ==
In 2001, Brown became the executive director of the Family Institute of Connecticut, a socially conservative organization.

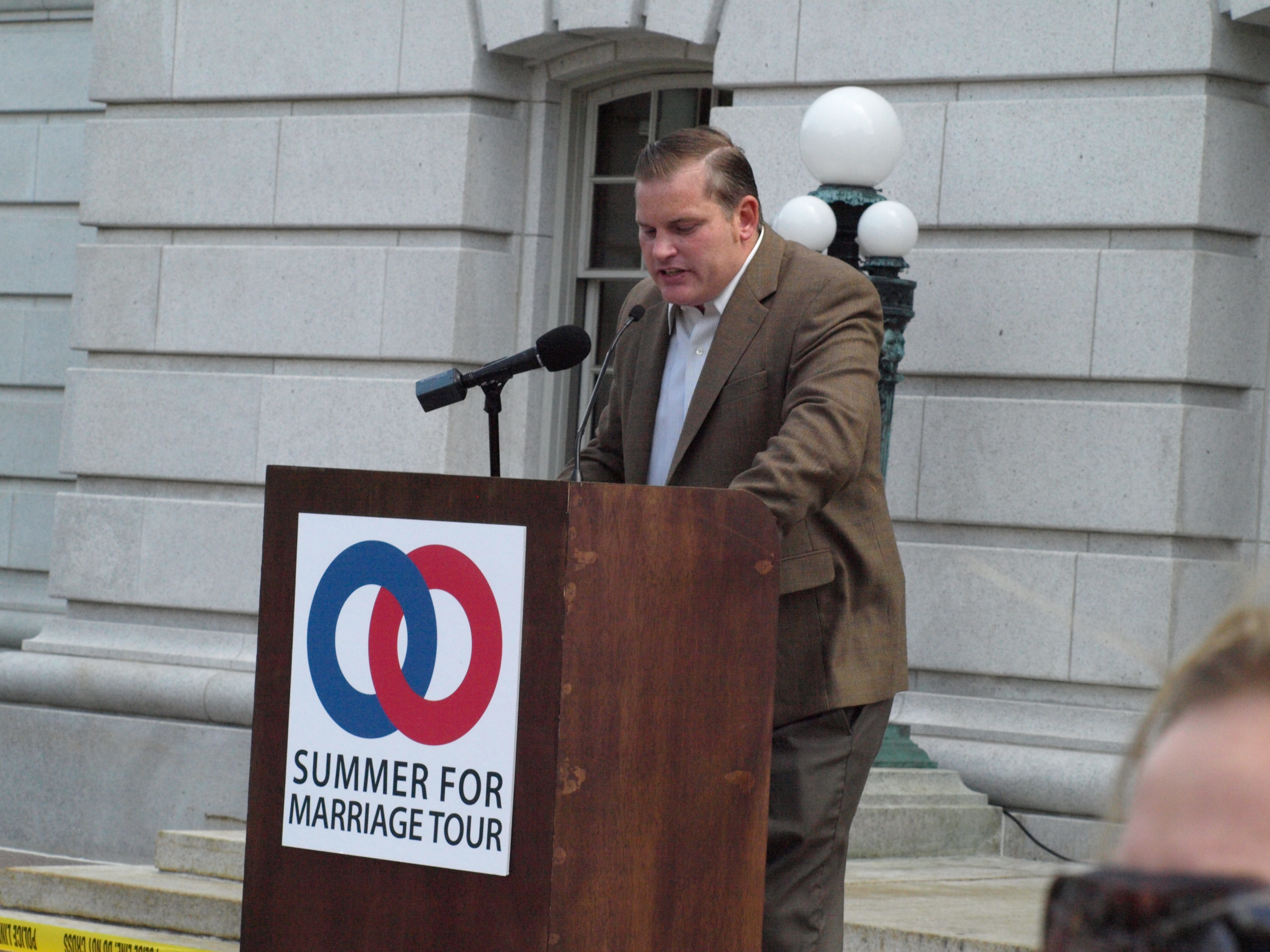
Brown speaking at a July 2010 National Organization for Marriage event at the Wisconsin State Capitol

Since its founding in 2007, Brown has been National Organization for Marriage's executive director and was additionally named president in 2010, succeeding Maggie Gallagher. NOM led the initiative to pass California's Proposition 8 in 2008, which intended to constitutionally ban same-sex marriage in the state.

In 2012, he announced that NOM would launch a global "Dump Starbucks" campaign in response to that company's support for same-sex marriage. In October 2013, Brown announced that The National Organization for Marriage filed a lawsuit in federal court against the Internal Revenue Service for releasing confidential tax documents; the lawsuit was settled for $50,000.

As of August 2018, Brown was the president of the Howard Center for Family, Religion and Society, an anti-abortion advocacy group which is part of the World Congress of Families (WCF) network supporting far right groups in Europe and other continents. He is on the Foundation Board of Trustees of CitizenGo, a Spanish anti-abortion advocacy group founded in 2013.

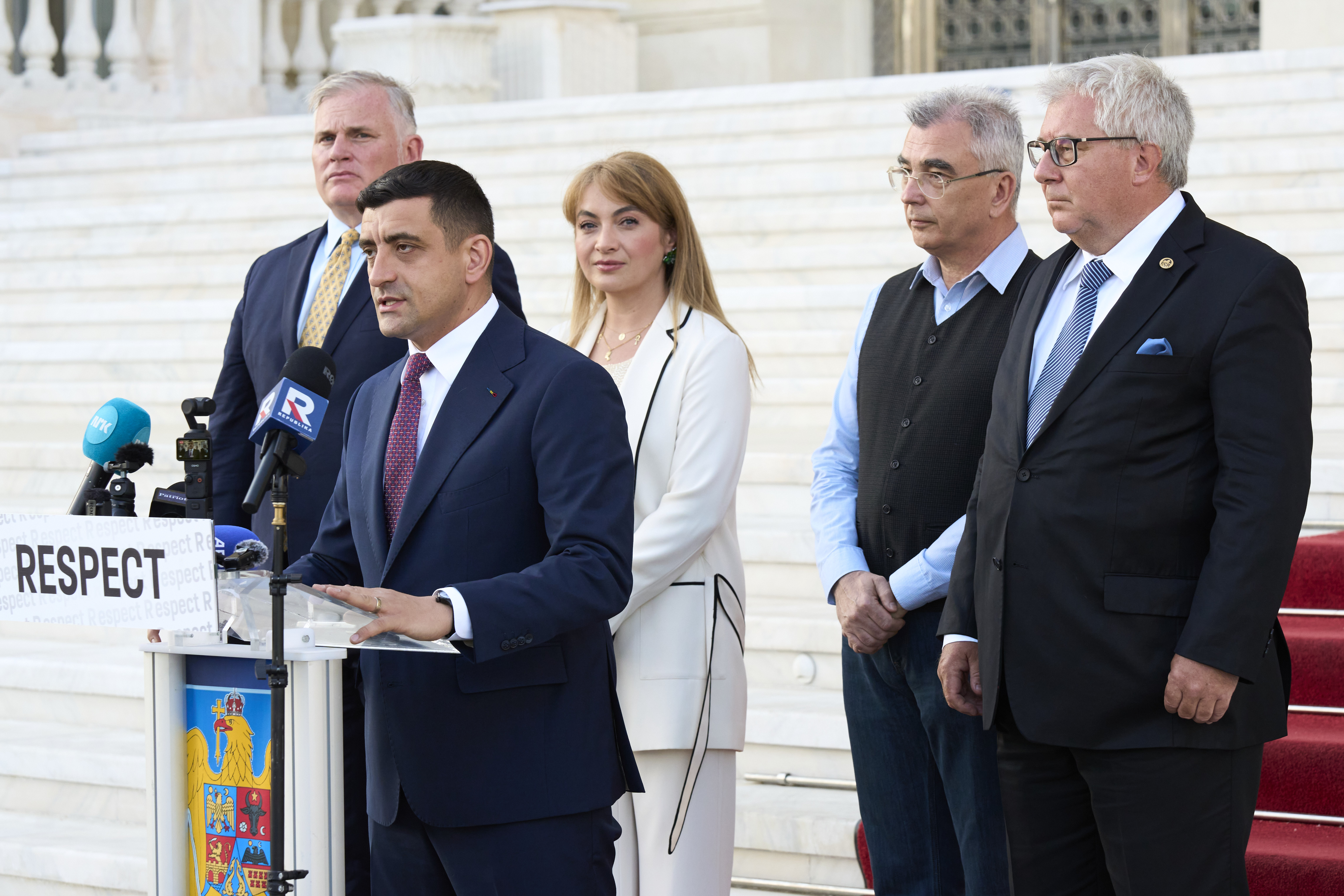
Brown during a press briefing with George Simion at the Romanian parliament in Bucharest, May 2025 (Note: From left to right: Brown, George Simion, Silvia Uscov, Petrișor Peiu and Ryszard Czarnecki.)

In late 2019, NOM filed a brief related to the cases about LGBTQ rights—Bostock v. Clayton County; Harris Funeral Homes v. EEOC; and Altitude Express v. Zarda—pending before the Supreme Court. On October 29, 2019, two Supreme Court justices, Brett Kavanaugh and Samuel Alito, posed for a photograph with Brown inside the Court. The other two people who posed in the photo were Gloria, Princess of Thurn and Taxis and Cardinal Gerhard Ludwig Müller.

== Personal life ==
Brown was raised in Whittier, California. At age 25 he converted from Quakerism to Roman Catholicism. He has a bachelor's degree from Whittier College, where he was student body president, and a second earned bachelor's in modern history from Oxford University (that was promoted per tradition to a master's).
