= Third Way (disambiguation) =

The Third Way is a political position advocating a varying synthesis of center-right and center-left policies.

Third Way may also refer to:

== Political ideologies ==
- Syncretic politics, politics outside of the conventional left–right political spectrum
- Third International Theory, a style of government proposed by Libyan leader Muammar Gaddafi
- Third Position, a set of neo-fascist ideologies

== Political organizations ==
- Third Way (France), a Third Position organization in France
- Third Way (Israel), a political party in Israel active during the late 1990s
- Third Way (Palestinian authority), a left-wing liberal Palestinian political party in the Palestinian National Authority
- Third Way (UK organisation), a right-wing think tank in the United Kingdom that was founded as a political party
- Third Way (American think tank), a public policy think tank in the United States
- Third Way (Germany), a far right, neo-Nazi political party in Germany
- Third Way (Polish political alliance), a centrist electoral coalition in Poland

== Publications ==
- Third Way (magazine), a British Christian current affairs magazine
- The Third Way: The Renewal of Social Democracy, a 1998 book by the British sociologist Anthony Giddens

== Other ==
- Socialist self-management, an economical model different from capitalism and Soviet Union socialism, adopted in Yugoslavia
- From Aquinas' "Five Ways" arguments for God's existence: the Third Way, the argument from contingency

== See also ==
- The III. Path, a German neo-Nazi political party
- Third Ways, a 2007 book by Allan C. Carlson
- The 3rd Alternative, a 2011 book by Stephen Covey
