= Magnes =

Magnes may refer to:

- Magnes (son of Aeolus), in Greek mythology, the eponym and first king of Magnesia
- Magnes (son of Argos), in Greek mythology, son of Argos and Perimele, and father of Hymenaeus
- Magnes the shepherd, possibly mythological, cited as the discoverer of natural magnetism
- Magnes (comic poet) (5th century BC), Athenian victor of the Dionysia festival
- Macarius Magnes (4th century), bishop of Magnesia
- Judah Leon Magnes (1877–1948), reform rabbi in the United States and Palestine, first president of the Hebrew University of Jerusalem
- Magnes Press, the publishing house of the Hebrew University of Jerusalem
- Magnes (album), by Reni Jusis

== See also ==
- Magnes (mythology)
- Magness (disambiguation)
- Magnus (disambiguation)
