= Janice Shaw Crouse =

American anti-abortion activist

Janice Shaw Crouse is an American anti-abortion activist. She was executive director of the World Congress of Families IX. She is Senior Fellow of Concerned Women for America. She is on the advisory board of Coalition for Divorce Reform.

She was raised in Milstead, Georgia and graduated from Asbury College in 1961. There she met her future husband Gilbert Crouse. She was a college dean and public high school teacher. She became George H. W. Bush's speechwriter in 1991. In the 90s, she was executive director of Institute on Religion and Democracy's Ecumenical Coalition on Women and Society project. George W. Bush appointed her as an official US delegate to the 2002 U.N. Children's Summit and 2003 U.N. Commission on the Status of Women.

== Bibliography ==
- Children at Risk: The Precarious State of Children's Well-Being in America (Transaction Publishers, 2010)
- Marriage Matters: Perspectives on the Private and Public Importance of Marriage (Transaction Publishers, 2012)
