= Allan C. Carlson =

American scholar

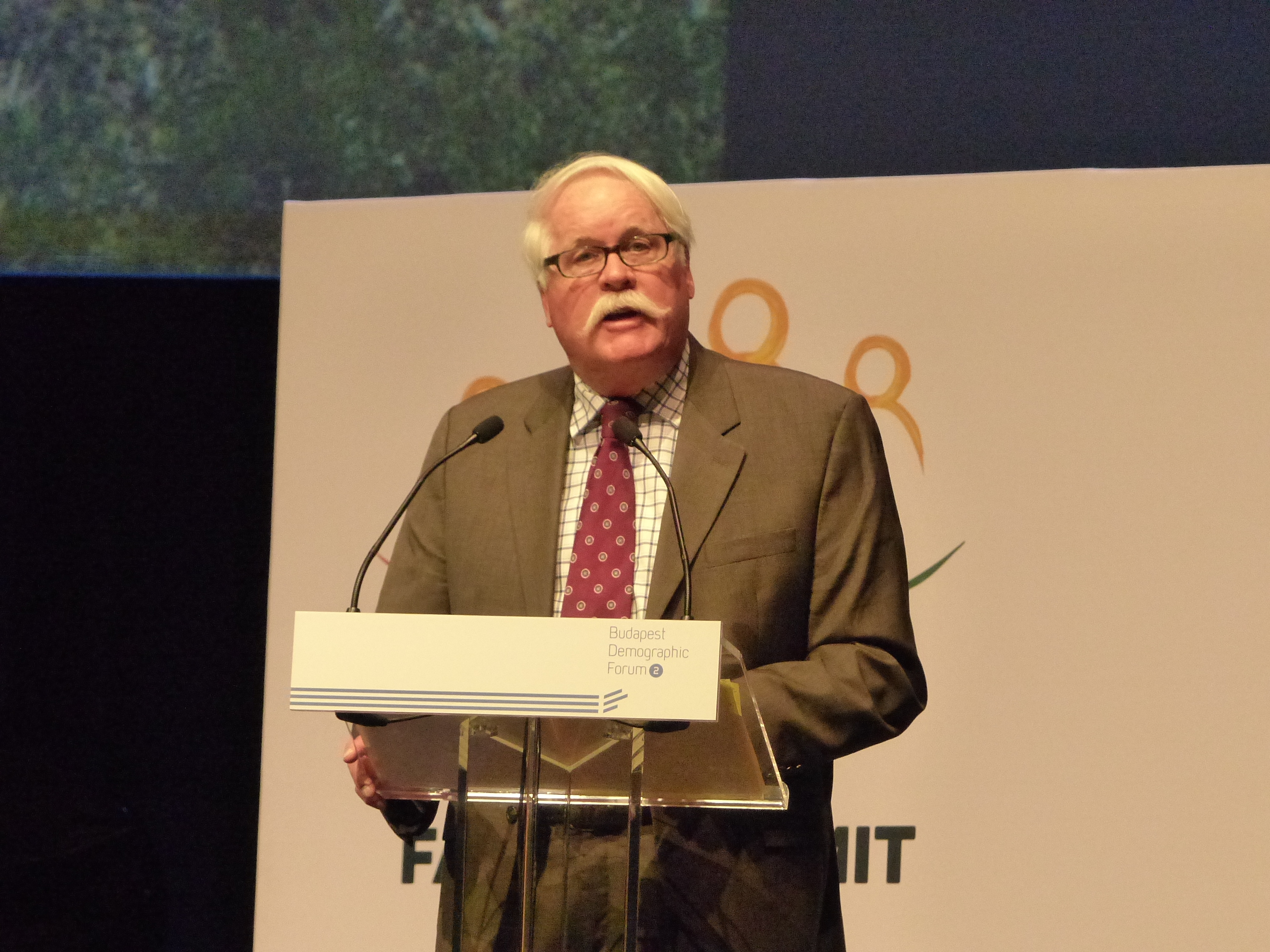
Allan C. Carlson addressing the Budapest Demographic Forum in 2017

Allan C. Carlson (born 1949) is an American scholar and former professor of history at Hillsdale College in Hillsdale, Michigan. He is the President Emeritus of the Howard Center for Family, Religion and Society, former director of the Family in America Studies Center, founder and long time International Secretary of the World Congress of Families and editor of The Natural Family: An International Journal of Research and Policy newsletter. He is also former president of the Rockford Institute.

== Biography ==
Carlson earned his B.A. from Augustana College and his Ph.D. in European history from Ohio University in 1975. He served as a member of the Lutheran Council in America's Government Affairs Office from 1975 to 1978. In 1979, he became a lecturer and assistant-to-the-president at Gettysburg College. He joined The Rockford Institute in 1981 (becoming its President in 1986). In 1997, he joined with John A. Howard in splitting off from that organization and forming the Howard Center. He was appointed to the National Commission on Children in 1988 by Ronald Reagan. In 2003, Carlson served on the ISI summer faculty at Oriel College, Oxford. He is Senior Editor of Touchstone: A Journal of Mere Christianity.

His articles and treatises have addressed the underlying causes of population decline, the effects of taxation and regulation on the size and well-being of the family, as well as historical efforts to implement a family wage in the United States. He has observed that the post-World War II baby boom in the United States was largely a "Catholic phenomenon". "[T]he 1945–1964 era produced a 'heroic' flowering of Catholic family life in America. Although fertility rose for all American religious groups, it rose far more rapidly and stayed high longer among Catholics.... The total marital fertility rate for non-Catholics averaged 3.15 children born per woman in the early 1950s and 3.14 in the early 1960s. For Catholics, the respective figures were 3.54 and 4.25."

Carlson has also criticized the impact of feminism on women's roles in society as disastrous and continuing to take its toll on the family.

== Bibliography ==
- Family Questions: Reflections on the American Social Crisis, (Transaction Press, 1988)
- The Swedish Experiment in Family Politics: The Myrdals and the Interwar Population Crisis, (Transaction Press,1990)
- From Cottage to Work Station: The Family's Search for Social Harmony in the Industrial Age, (Ignatius Press, 1993)
- The New Agrarian Mind: The Movement Toward Decentralist Thought in 20th Century America, (Transaction Press, 2000)
- The American Way: Family and Community in the Shaping of the American Identity, (ISI Books, 2003)
- "Wendell Berry and the Twentieth-Century Agrarian 'Series'" – Essay published in Wendell Berry: Life and Work edited by Jason Peters (U. Press of Kentucky, 2007)
- Third Ways: How Bulgarian Greens, Swedish Housewives, and Beer-Swilling Englishmen Created Family-Centered Economies – and Why They Disappeared, (ISI Books, 2007)
- The Natural Family: A Manifesto, (Spence Pub, 2007)
- Godly Seed: American Evangelicals Confront Birth Control, 1873-1973, (Transaction Publishers, 2012)
- The Natural Family Where It Belongs: New Agrarian Essays, (Routledge, 2014)
- Family Cycles: Strength, Decline, and Renewal in American Domestic Life, 1630–2000, (Routledge, 2016)
