= Magnus (disambiguation) =

Magnus is a given name and surname.

Magnus may also refer to:

== Arts and entertainment ==
- Magnús (film), a 1989 Icelandic film by Þráinn Bertelsson
- Magnus (2007 film), an Estonian film by Kadri Kõusaar
- Magnus (2016 film), a Norwegian documentary about former World Chess Champion Magnus Carlsen
- Magnus (novel), a 1973 fictional account of the life of Magnus Erlendsson by George Mackay Brown
- Magnus, a 2005 novel by Sylvie Germain
- Magnus (band), a Belgian band
- Magnus (album), a 2015 album by Audiomachine
- Magnus (comic artist) (1939–1996), Italian comic book author
- "Magnus" (Gunsmoke), a 1955 television episode

== Other uses ==
- Daewoo Magnus, automobile
- Magnus (computer algebra system)
- Magnus, Newark-on-Trent, Nottinghamshire, England
- Magnus Harmonica Corporation, manufacturer of harmonicas and reed organs

== See also ==
- Magnus effect, in physics
- Magna (disambiguation)
- Magnes (disambiguation)
- Magnum (disambiguation)
- Manus (disambiguation)
