= Michael McManus =

Michael McManus may refer to:

- Michael McManus (American actor) (born 1946), American character actor
- Michael McManus (Canadian actor) (born 1962), Canadian actor
- Mike McManus (columnist) (born 1942), American columnist
- Michael A. McManus Jr. (born 1943), American political strategist
- Stephen Baldwin's character from the film The Usual Suspects

== See also ==
- Michaela McManus (born 1983), American actress
- Mick McManus (footballer) (born 1954), Scottish footballer
- Mick McManus (wrestler) (1920–2013), English professional wrestler born William George Matthews
