= McManners =

McManners, also spelt MacManners, is a surname. It is considered a variant spelling of McManus.

Notable people with the surname include:

- Hugh McManners (born 1952), English television presenter and writer
- John McManners (1916–2006), English academic and historian
- Joseph McManners (born 1992), English singer-songwriter, musician, and actor
