= James McManus (disambiguation) =

James McManus (born 1951) is an American writer and poker player.

James or Jim McManus may also refer to:

- James McManus (footballer) (born 2005), Irish professional footballer
- James McManus (rugby league) (born 1986), Scottish rugby player
- James Edward McManus (1900–1976), American prelate of the Roman Catholic Church
- James Hilton McManus (born 1992), badminton player from South Africa
- James McManus (Royal Australian Navy) (1891–1972)
- James O. McManus (1894–unknown), lieutenant governor of Rhode Island
- James McManus (Iowa politician) (1804–1879), member of the Iowa House of Representatives
- Jim McManus (baseball) (born 1936), American baseball player
- Jim McManus (actor) (1940–2023), British actor
- Jim McManus (tennis) (1940–2011), American tennis player
- Jim McKay (1921–2008), American sportscaster born James McManus
