= Frank McManus =

Frank/Francis McManus/MacManus may refer to:

- Frank McManus (Australian politician) (1905–1983), leader of the Democratic Labor Party
- Francis MacManus (1909 – 1965), Irish novelist and broadcaster
  - Francis MacManus Award, an award for short story writing, named in his honour
- Frank McManus (Irish politician) (born 1942), former Unity Member of Parliament for Fermanagh and South Tyrone
- Frank McManus (baseball) (1875–1923), catcher in Major League Baseball
- Francis J. McManus (1844–?), political figure in New Brunswick, Canada
