= Bush administration payment of columnists =

Payment of public funds to right-wing columnists by the George W. Bush administration

The Bush administration payment of columnists refers to the payment of public funds to right-wing media commentators by several U.S. executive departments under Cabinet officials to promote various policies of U.S. president George W. Bush's administration. Hundreds of thousands of dollars were paid to at least three commentators to promote Bush administration policies.

== Investigative reports ==
=== Armstrong Williams ===
The payments were revealed on January 7, 2005, in an investigative report by Greg Toppo of USA Today. USA Today had obtained the information through documents provided by the U.S. Department of Education after the newspaper had made a Freedom of Information Act request. The documents showed that Armstrong Williams, a prominent syndicated columnist and pundit on CNN and CNBC, had received $241,000 of tax money through the Education Department's contract with Ketchum Communications, a public relations firm. In exchange for the money, Williams promoted the No Child Left Behind initiative and encouraged other journalists and commentators to provide favorable views of the law. Williams admitted that he had received the payments and wrote a column entitled "My Apology," admitting to the charges but writing that he "did not change [his] views just because my PR firm was receiving paid advertising promoting the No Child Left Behind Act." Williams' column was cancelled by the Tribune Company, which had previously syndicated his work.

=== Maggie Gallagher ===
A second syndicated columnist, Maggie Gallagher, was revealed to have also accepted public funds from the Bush administration. An article by Howard Kurtz of The Washington Post first reported on January 26 that Gallagher had received $41,500 in two federal contracts from the Department of Health and Human Services for authoring brochures, a magazine article and a report and briefing government employees in support of Bush's marriage initiative, which redirected welfare funds, previously used to reward states for lowering out-of-wedlock child birth rates, to pay for premarital counseling and abstinence education.

=== Michael McManus ===
Michael McManus is the third person to be implicated, in an article by Tom Hamburger of the Los Angeles Times on January 28. It was revealed that McManus, who is a self-described marriage advocate and writes the "Ethics & Religion" column that appears in 50 regional newspapers, was paid through a subcontractor with a consulting firm that does work for the Department of Health and Human Services. The payments were said to be $4,000 plus travel expenses, with an additional $49,000 paid to his organization, Marriage Savers Inc.

== Bush's response ==
The President responded to the ensuing scandal by denying any taxpayer money was used to pay columnists and stating that any such action is forbidden under his administration.
