= Magness (surname) =

Magness is a surname. Notable people with the surname include:

- Bob Magness (1924–1996), American businessman
- Clif Magness, American songwriter and record producer
- Gary Magness, American businessman and film producer
- Janiva Magness (born 1957), American singer and songwriter
- Jodi Magness (born 1956), American biblical scholar
