= Tony McManus =

Tony McManus may refer to:

- Tony McManus (musician) (born 1965), Scottish steel-string guitarist
- Tony McManus (soccer) (born 1980), American soccer player
- Tony McManus (Gaelic footballer) (born 1957), former Gaelic footballer from County Roscommon, Ireland
