= Henry Manus =

Dutch philatelist

- Born: July 21, 1851
- Died: October 24, 1931 (aged 80)
- Occupation: Philatelist

Henry Philip Manus (21 July 1851 – 24 October 1931) was a Dutch philatelist who signed the Roll of Distinguished Philatelists in 1924. He was a member of the Royal Philatelic Society London from 1910 and that society's special representative in the Netherlands.
