= Manis (surname) =

Manis is a surname. Notable people with the surname include:

- Andrew M. Manis (born 1954), American historian
- Chad Manis (fighter) (fl. 2010), mixed martial art fighter
- Chad Manis (football), University of Utah quarterback
- J.T. Manis, author
- Brian Manis, film producer
- Bryan Manis, film producer
