= Thomas McManus =

Thomas McManus may refer to

- Tam McManus (Thomas Kelly McManus, born 1981), Scottish footballer
- Thomas F. McManus (1856–1938), naval architect
- Thomas J. McManus (1864–1926), New York politician
- Tom McManus (American football) (born 1970), American footballer
