= Patrick McManus =

Patrick McManus may refer to:

- Pat McManus of Mama's Boys and Celtus
- Patrick McManus (rugby league), rugby league footballer of the 1930s for Castleford
- Patrick McManus (footballer) (1867–1940), Scottish footballer
- Patrick F. McManus (1933–2018), American humor writer
- Patrick J. McManus (1954–2009), Massachusetts attorney and politician
- Pat McManus (1859–1917), baseball player
