= National Organization for Marriage =

American non-profit political organization

- Formation: 2007
- Type: NPO
- Headquarters: Princeton, New Jersey, United States
- President: Brian S. Brown
- Website: nationformarriage.org

The National Organization for Marriage (NOM) is an American non-profit political organization established to work against the legalization of same-sex marriage in the United States. It was formed in 2007 specifically to pass California Proposition 8, a state prohibition of same-sex marriage. The group has opposed civil union legislation and gay adoption, and has fought against allowing transgender individuals to use bathrooms that accord with their gender identity. Brian S. Brown has been the group's president since 2010.

== Leadership ==
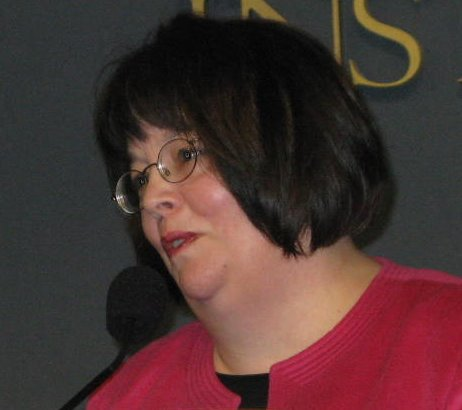
NOM's co-founder Maggie Gallagher speaking at the Cato Institute in 2010

NOM's founding board of directors consisted of:

- Maggie Gallagher, president
- Brian S. Brown, executive director (former executive director of Family Institute of Connecticut)
- Robert P. George, chairman of the board
- Neil Corkery, treasurer
- Chuck Stetson (chairman of the board, Bible Literacy Project)
- Ken Von Kohorn (chairman of the board, Family Institute of Connecticut)
- Luis Tellez (president, Witherspoon Institute Board of Trustees)
- Matthew S. Holland (president, Utah Valley University)

In April 2009, Holland was replaced on the board by Orson Scott Card (science fiction novelist and faculty member, Southern Virginia University), who then resigned in July 2013 after calling the battle against legalization of same-sex marriage in the US "moot" following a Supreme Court decision. In September 2011, law professor John C. Eastman replaced Gallagher as the chairman of the board.

As of 2021, Brown remains the president and Eastman chairman of the board. As of 2011, law professor Robert P. George was chairman emeritus. As of 2011, Gallagher was still a board member and worked on specific projects for the group.

== Nonprofit status and funding ==
=== Groups and projects ===
The group operates two nonprofit arms: a 501(c)(4) political advocacy group called National Organization for Marriage Inc., established in January 2008, and a 501(c)(3) called NOM Education Fund established in July 2008. The latter arm is not entitled to influence legislation or political campaigns. The Firefighters' Defense Fund, which existed to fund a successful sexual harassment lawsuit by firemen who claim they were forced to participate in a gay pride parade, was a NOM Education Fund project.

The group also operates state-based political action committees such as National Organization for Marriage PAC New York founded in June 2009, and National Organization for Marriage California PAC founded in February 2009. The state PACs receive funding from the main 501(c)(4) NOM arm.

=== Funding ===
NOM claims it has a wide base of grassroots support, however the majority of its funding comes from a very few anonymous sources making large donations. In NOM's IRS filing for 2009, three donations of $2.4 million, $1.2 million and $1.1 million made up 68% of NOM's contributions and grants income of a little over $7.1 million, and just five donations made up 75%.

In 2010, Jesse Zwick, then a reporter for the Washington Independent, said he uncovered a 2009 donation to NOM—$1.43 million from the Knights of Columbus—that reporter Luke Johnson later said was apparently not reported to the IRS by NOM.

In 2010, two donors provided $6 million, two-thirds of the total donations for the year.

On its 2012 tax return, NOM reported a roughly $2 million deficit. Three donors contributed nearly two-thirds of the organization's $9.3 million in donations.

=== Mormon connection ===
Gay rights activist Fred Karger said in 2010 that NOM is connected to LDS Church, with large private donations coming from Mormon sources. Gallagher responded by denying any connection "except that a Mormon serves on NOM's board". Former board member Matthew S. Holland is a Mormon as is his replacement Orson Scott Card, and Catholic board member Robert P. George has served since August 2010 as an editorial advisor to the Deseret News, a newspaper owned by the LDS Church.

== Activity ==
NOM has been involved in ballot measures, legislative elections, judicial elections, and issue advertising in various states. NOM was involved in the successful Proposition 8 campaign in California in 2008, as well as a similar successful campaign in Maine one year later. They were also involved in unsuccessful efforts to pass an amendment eliminating same-sex marriage in Massachusetts in 2007. NOM participated in efforts to block same-sex marriage in New Jersey, and has unsuccessfully attempted to block same-sex marriage legalization in New York, Vermont, New Hampshire, Connecticut, and the District of Columbia. On June 16, 2009, NOM announced the formation of NOM PAC New York, a political action committee with a goal of providing $500,000 to fund primary challenges against any Republican New York state senator who votes for gay marriage. NOM stated that they were "also looking to aid Democratic candidates who want to buck the establishment on the marriage issue, and to help in general election contests". In 2010, NOM was involved in successful efforts to oust three Iowa Supreme Court judges who had concurred in a decision that effectively legalized same-sex marriage there.

In 2009, Peter Montgomery of the progressive organization People for the American Way stated: "You have to take [NOM] seriously [...] They've raised a tremendous amount of money that they're funneling into various states."

=== 2007 Massachusetts constitutional amendment ===
One of the group's first public acts was to campaign in support of a proposed 2007 Massachusetts constitutional amendment banning same-sex marriage by restricting marriage to "the union of one man and one woman", in response to the Massachusetts court decision that legalized same-sex marriage in that state. The NOM-supported amendment failed to pass. The campaign included a billboard comparing representative Angelo Puppolo to Judas Iscariot and Benedict Arnold after he changed his position to oppose the amendment.

=== California Proposition 8 ===
NOM was first formed to support the passage of California Proposition 8 in 2008, which amended the state Constitution to discontinue same-sex marriage ceremonies. The amendment defined marriage as the union between one man and one woman. NOM contributed $1.8 million to the Proposition 8 effort, and has been described as being "instrumental" in the success of the initiative. Proposition 8 was passed by voters 52% to 48%, and involved an estimated $83M by both sides of the issue. The amendment was in force until United States district court Judge Vaughn R. Walker overturned it in August 2010, in the case Perry v. Schwarzenegger, ruling that it violated both the Due Process and Equal Protection clauses of the United States Constitution. NOM chairman Maggie Gallagher expressed her disagreement with the ruling, targeting Walker's sexuality and accusing him of "substituting his views for those of the American people and of our Founding Fathers". NOM President, Brian Snow, also expressed dissatisfaction with the ruling, stating "With a stroke of his pen, Judge Walker has overruled the votes and values of 7 million Californians" Walker did however place a temporary injunction on same-sex marriages to allow the defendants to bring their case before the United States Supreme Court. On June 26, 2013, the United States Supreme Court ruled the defendants in the case lacked standing to appeal earlier rulings in Federal Court. As a consequence, Walker's opinion striking down the law as unconstitutional stands as the final decision in the case. NOM addressed the Supreme Court's ruling on its website, asking the nation "show its displeasure" with the ruling, adding that "the Supreme Court ripped the legs out from under the institution of marriage."

=== Stand for Marriage Maine ===
In 2009, NOM was the primary contributor to Stand For Marriage Maine, the organization that led the successful campaign for Question 1 in Maine, a voter referendum that repealed the law passed by the legislature to allow same-sex marriages in the state. Voters passed the referendum 53%–47% out of 567,057 votes cast. Out of the initial $343,000 in contributions, NOM provided some $160,000.

NOM contributed over $1.6 million to Stand For Marriage Maine; by reports as of October 2009, NOM had contributed 63% of that group's funding.

NOM has brought a number of lawsuits to prevent being required to release the names of its donors funding Stand For Marriage Maine. In 2015, NOM released a campaign disclosure report after a state supreme court ruling on its release.

=== Advertising campaigns ===
On April 8, 2009, NOM began a "2 Million for Marriage" (2M4M) initiative with the intention of organizing two million activists nationwide. When NOM used the abbreviation "2M4M" for their "2 Million for Marriage" campaign, the media noted that in personal ads, "2M4M" is code for two men seeking a third male sexual partner. NOM did not secure the domain name and other net resources that use the "2M4M" term. Christopher Ambler, a consultant in rapid web development who characterizes himself as a "happily married straight guy", purchased the domain "2M4M.org" and branded it as "Two Men For Marriage", running material counter to NOM's 2M4M aims.

==== Gathering Storm ====
The 2M4M campaign used an advertisement, "Gathering Storm", in which actors, primarily Mormons from Arizona, standing against a dramatic storm-cloud background, voiced opposition to same-sex marriage.

The Human Rights Campaign, a lesbian, gay, bisexual, and transgender (LGBT) lobbying group and political action committee, described the ad saying that, in it, "actors make disproven claims about marriage for lesbian and gay couples".

New York Times columnist Frank Rich described the "Gathering Storm" advertisement as "an Internet camp classic", and it was parodied by Stephen Colbert, the website Funny or Die, and in the Futurama episode "Proposition Infinity".

==== Other advertisements ====
On April 30, 2009, NOM and beauty pageant winner Carrie Prejean launched another ad campaign against gay marriage, called "No Offense". In the ad, they object to being characterized as "outright bigots" because of their stance. After semi-nude photos of Prejean were posted on the Internet, some accused NOM of hypocrisy, NOM issued a press release stating that Prejean had appeared with NOM as a private citizen and not as a spokesperson. In the wake of the revelation that Prejean had made masturbation videos, NOM removed reference to the video from the front page of their website.

On May 28, 2009, NOM rolled out an advertising campaign in New York, including a video spot. The Christian Science Monitor described the spot as listing a "litany of grievances" as an "ominous score" plays, with a potentially embarrassing error for a campaign based on education: misspelling marriage as marraige.

During the 2016 North Carolina gubernatorial election, NOM released an ad criticizing Democratic candidate Roy Cooper for his support for allowing transgender individuals access to bathrooms that reflect their gender identity. The ad claimed that doing so would give sexual predators easy access to children and other potential victims.

=== New York Congressional phone campaign ===
NOM spent over $112,000 on a get-out-the-vote phone campaign for Conservative Party of New York candidate Douglas Hoffman in the contentious 2009 House of Representatives campaign for New York's 23rd District. After pro-same-sex-marriage Republican candidate Dede Scozzafava withdrew from the race, Hoffman lost to Democrat Bill Owens, who also opposed gay marriage, by a 2.3% margin. State senators said that this congressional race affected the New York State Senate's December 2, 2009 vote against same-sex marriage legislation; all 30 Republican state senators voted "no". Following her unsuccessful campaign, Scozzafava acknowledged that her name had begun being used as a verb: "scozzafavaed". When the gay Republican organization GOProud had a booth at the 2010 Conservative Political Action Conference, Brown commented, "[W]e have a message for GOProud on marriage: If you try to elect pro-gay-marriage Republicans, we will Dede Scozzafava them." In addition, Maggie Gallagher has used the phrase "the Dede effect" to describe Republican lawmakers' fear of alienating their constituents by voting for same-sex marriage legislation.

=== Summer for Marriage Tour ===
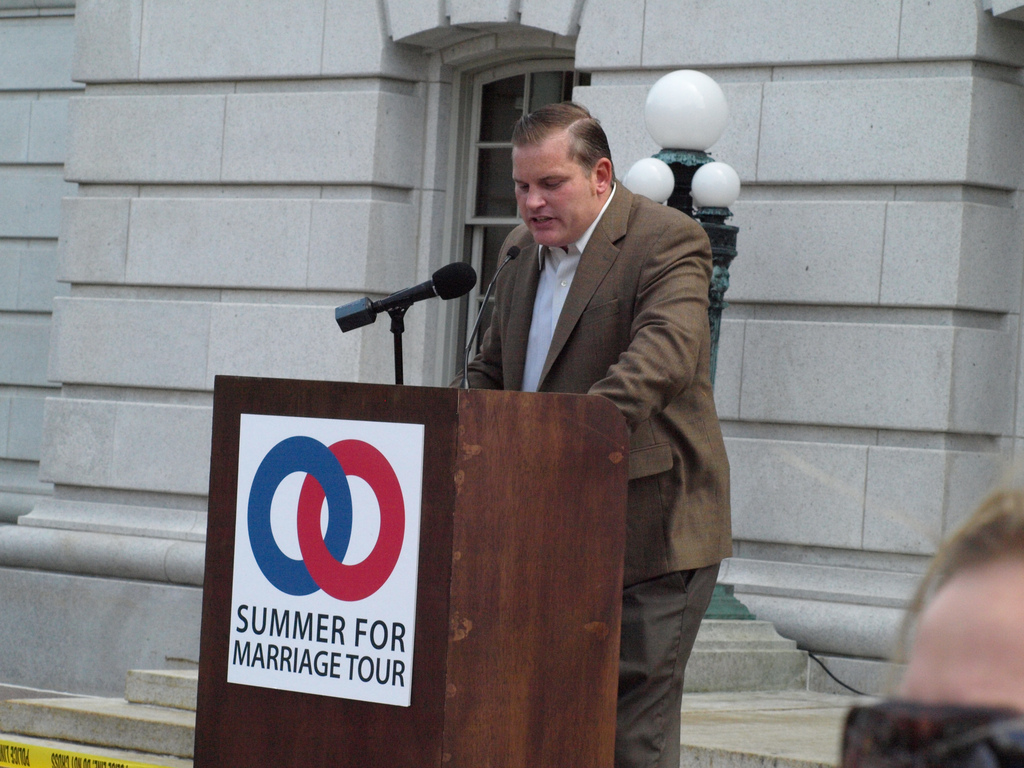
Brian S. Brown at the Summer For Marriage Tour

In 2010, NOM staged a 23-city tour holding rallies against same-sex marriage. The rallies attracted supporters and pro-gay marriage protesters. At many stops along the tour, NOM supporters were outnumbered by counter-protesters supporting same-sex marriage; in Atlanta, LGBT rights supporters outnumbered opponents of same-sex marriage by a ratio of ten to one. The tour ended with a rally at the United States Capitol Building in Washington, D.C., while pro-gay marriage activists held a simultaneous event at the Freedom Plaza.

After Peter Yarrow and Paul Stookey, the surviving members of Peter, Paul and Mary, discovered that NOM had been using their recording of "This Land is Your Land" rallies in this tour, they sent a letter to Brown requesting that NOM cease using their recording, stating that NOM's philosophy was "directly contrary to the advocacy position" held by the group. Similarly, after John Mellencamp was informed that NOM had used his song "Pink Houses" at one of their events, his publicist wrote a letter (at his instruction) stating Mellencamp's support for same-sex marriage and asking that NOM stop using his music.

=== Campaign finance lawsuit ===
NOM filed a lawsuit in US district court, on free speech grounds, seeking the right to run ads in the Rhode Island governor's race without complying with that state's campaign finance laws, including both campaign financing contribution limits and reporting requirements. In October 2010 the suit was dismissed; the court called the filing "disorganized, vague and poorly constructed" and gave the group one week to refile the lawsuit. NOM appealed to federal court, who ruled against them.

=== Civil union opposition ===
NOM has opposed civil union recognition, calling it "a direct threat to marriage and the religious liberties" and stating that "civil union statutes across the country have been used to sue business owners and professionals who run their practices by their deeply held religious beliefs." It has campaigned against the passage of Illinois's Religious Freedom Protection and Civil Union Act, SB 1716.

=== Iowa judge retention vote campaign ===
On November 2, 2010, NOM ran a bus tour through Iowa campaigning for removal of three Iowa Supreme Court justices then up for a retention vote, following the court's unanimous decision in Varnum v. Brien; the retention vote was "the most controversial...and one of the closest" races on the ballot. All three justices lost the retention vote, the first time any judge had lost that vote since Iowa initiated the retention system in 1962.

=== New York same-sex marriage opposition ===
NOM actively opposed legalization of same-sex marriage in New York in 2011. The group sponsored a rally in the Bronx in May 2011 with state Senator Rubén Díaz Sr., a Democrat. After same-sex marriage was legalized in the state by the legislature in June 2011, NOM pledged to spend $2 million to defeat the four Republicans who voted for the bill to legalize it, and erected signs in the districts of those senators, warning "You're Next". Wealthy same-sex marriage supporters vowed to finance the targeted senators.

NOM supported four "Let the People Vote" rallies later in July of the same year, with the stated purpose of having the voters decide the issue versus the bill passed by the state's legislature.

=== North Carolina Amendment 1 ===
NOM provided more than $300,000 to the committee supporting North Carolina's Amendment 1, a 2012 referendum which would alter the state's constitution to forbid marriage and all other recognition for same-sex couples.

=== 2012 presidential pledge ===
On August 3, 2011, NOM unveiled a pledge for 2012 Republican presidential candidates. Signers pledged that they would support a federal marriage amendment, appoint federal judges who are originalists and thus "reject the idea our Founding Fathers inserted a right to gay marriage in our Constitution", defend the Defense of Marriage Act in court, "establish a presidential commission on religious liberty to investigate and document reports of Americans who have been harassed or threatened for exercising key civil rights to organize, to speak, to donate or to vote for marriage", and "advance legalization to return to the people of the District of Columbia their right to vote on marriage". This pledge was signed by candidates Rick Perry, Mitt Romney, Rick Santorum, Michele Bachmann, and Newt Gingrich (who initially declined), along with Tim Pawlenty; Ron Paul and Herman Cain chose not to sign. During the Iowa primary campaign, NOM aired a TV ad targeting Paul, contrasting his failure to pledge with the activities of "the major presidential candidates", thus implying that Paul was not truly in contention in the primary campaign.

=== Oregon intercession ===
NOM attempted repeatedly to intercede in the legalization of same-sex marriage in Oregon. The group requested to be allowed to act as defendants in the state court case that ultimately found the ban on same-sex marriage to be unconstitutional, but were denied by the judge as lacking standing, a ruling that was confirmed by the federal Ninth Circuit Court of Appeals. After the ruling that started same-sex marriage in the state, NOM filed a request with the U.S. Supreme Court, asking that the state court's ruling be stayed, to allow NOM to further pursue its case for being an intercessor, and that the matter be reviewed by the Supreme Court. The request was denied.

=== March For Marriage ===
NOM organized protest marches against same-sex marriage in Washington, DC, in 2013, 2014, 2015, 2016, and 2017. The 2015 March For Marriage took place on April 25, the Saturday before the Supreme Court heard oral arguments in a set of cases related to same-sex marriage. About 100 people attended the 2016 event, including counterprotestors. About 50 attended in 2017.

=== IRS release of donor information ===
In October 2013, NOM filed a federal lawsuit alleging that the IRS had intentionally leaked its 2008 tax return—including donor lists—in violation of federal law. The lawsuit arose from the March 2012 disclosure of NOM's 2008 IRS Form 990, Schedule B (which contained donor data) to an LGBT rights advocacy group and to the media. Under U.S. federal law, "the IRS is required to provide the public with certain tax information for 501(c)(4) organizations upon request—but personal identifying information of donors must be redacted by the agency." In a June 2014 ruling, Judge James Cacheris of the U.S. District Court for the Eastern District of Virginia dismissed most of NOM's claims. While the IRS acknowledged that it had improperly made an unredacted copy of NOM's tax information public, the court found that NOM provided "no evidence that the information was willfully disclosed or the result of gross negligence". In June 2014, the IRS agreed to settle NOM's remaining claims of improper disclosure of confidential tax information by paying $50,000 to NOM.

=== Transgender students ===
On September 20, 2013, NOM announced that they would gather signatures aimed at putting a proposition on the November 2014 California ballot to repeal a law addressing the rights of transgender students. The law, AB 1266, allows students to play on school sports teams and to use school bathrooms that accord with their gender identity. Brown said that "Opening our most vulnerable areas at school including showers, bathrooms and changing rooms to members of the opposite sex is politically-correct madness that risks the privacy and security of our children and grandchildren." On February 24, 2014, the California secretary of state's office reported that the proposition had failed to gather enough valid signatures to qualify for the November election.

=== International activities ===
NOM president Brown has spoken in Russia against adoption by LGBT people. He spoke to the Committee on International Affairs of the State Duma, telling committee members that persecution of religious people would arise from permitting equal rights for LGBT people in any form.

=== Free Speech Bus ===
Along with the Spain-based advocacy group CitizenGo and the International Organization for the Family, NOM activists toured in the "Free Speech Bus", an orange bus displaying the anti-transgender slogan "It's Biology: Boys are boys... and always will be. Girls are girls... and always will be. You can't change sex. Respect all." This campaign, aimed to oppose the concept of transgender people, mainly covered the U.S. East Coast. At one stop in Boston, protesters tried to block the bus, and at another stop, it was vandalized.

== IRS filings ==
In 2009, Californians Against Hate (CAH) filed a formal complaint with the IRS against NOM, saying that NOM had refused to make its IRS 990 forms public, as required by law. CAH representatives went to "the Princeton, New Jersey, offices of the National Organization for Marriage twice to get copies of their IRS 990 reports, to no avail," said CAH's president, Fred Karger. "Then our representative, Ben Katzenberg, sent two certified letters to the NOM office on March 18, 2009, requesting its two 990 forms. Federal law requires NOM to furnish copies of these IRS filings within 30 days after the request has been received. And 40 days later, still no 990s." NOM has since posted 990 forms for 2007 and 2008 on their website.

== Campaign finance issues ==
In March 2009, Fred Karger filed a complaint with the California Fair Political Practices Commission alleging that the National Organization for Marriage was established by the Church of Jesus Christ of Latter-day Saints in order to direct church funds toward the passage of Proposition 8. A church spokesman and NOM's then-president Maggie Gallagher both denied the allegations.

In 2009, the Maine Commission on Governmental Ethics and Election Practices voted, 3–2, to investigate NOM for campaign finance violations; the Commission overrode the recommendation of their staff. Maine law required organizations soliciting more than $5,000 for ballot question campaigns to file disclosure reports. NOM had contributed $1.6 million to Stand For Marriage Maine without filing any disclosure reports. NOM filed suit, claiming that the state's election laws violate the Constitution. NOM, arguing that their lawsuit was likely to succeed, sought a federal restraining order to avoid having to provide donor names before the date of the balloting, which U.S. District Court Judge David Brock Hornby denied. In February 2011, Hornby issued a summary judgment ruling that Maine's disclosure law was valid, a decision NOM appealed and lost in August 2011. NOM's efforts to appeal in the federal courts failed when the Supreme Court declined to hear one appeal in February 2012 and another in October 2012. In 2014, the Maine Commission on Governmental Ethics and Election Practices fined NOM over $50,000 and demanded that the group file a campaign finance report; the report was required to include the identities of donors who supported NOM's efforts in connection with the 2009 Maine referendum. NOM filed a complaint against two groups that support gay marriage: The Human Rights Campaign and the National Gay & Lesbian Task Force Foundation, saying that they had engaged in the same actions as NOM. On August 24, 2015, the Sun Journal reported that NOM had paid the State of Maine a fine of over $50,000, that it had disclosed the names of its donors, and that NOM had stated that it would not continue to contest the matter in court.

In Iowa, NOM was investigated by the Iowa Ethics & Campaign Disclosure Board over whether it failed to properly disclose the names of donors towards its campaign to unseat judges who had ruled in favor of same-sex marriage in the state. Previously, it had faced accusations from the Interfaith Alliance of Iowa Action Fund and One Iowa that it has failed to properly disclose its contributors. NOM's efforts in that state included spending $86,060 on the failed state House of Representatives campaign of Stephen Burgmeier.

NOM executive director Brown has stated that the group keeps the identities of its donors private to prevent donor intimidation by proponents of same-sex marriage. The group used that argument in an unsuccessful lawsuit seeking to exempt them from California's disclosure laws.

== Criticism and opposition ==
=== "NOM Exposed" ===
In September 2010, the Human Rights Campaign (HRC) and the Courage Campaign launched "NOM Exposed", a website which says it documents "Truth, Lies, and Connections about the So-Called National Organization for Marriage." The site contained profiles of NOM leaders and prominent supporters; details of NOM's links to Latter-Day Saints, the Catholic Church and conservative Christian organizations such as Opus Dei, the Knights of Columbus and Focus on the Family; information about NOM's budget; and an interactive map with information on NOM activities in specific states. HRC spokesperson Michael Cole characterized NOM as "a secretive player in antigay politics, which is posing as an offshore company for antigay religious money"; NOM president Brown countered that NOM is "not out to hoodwink voters... [but is] talking openly about same-sex marriage" and predicted that the "NOM Exposed" website would backfire. Brown also said that HRC's "heavy-handed attacks on NOM only prove that we are the key national organization fighting for marriage as one man and one woman."

=== Southern Poverty Law Center ===
The Southern Poverty Law Center included NOM on its Winter 2010 list of "anti-gay groups" that "have continued to pump out demonizing propaganda aimed at homosexuals". NOM president Brown took issue with the inclusion, stating that NOM "isn't about being anti-anyone".

=== Resignation of Louis Marinelli ===
Louis Marinelli, a 25-year-old NOM activist and online strategist who described himself as "the one behind the 2010 Summer for Marriage Tour", had driven a bus during the tour and moderated many of NOM's web properties (including its Facebook page, its Twitter account, and the Tour blog). On April 8, 2011, he resigned from the organization, announcing his support for same-sex marriage and categorically apologizing for and repudiating his past activities on behalf of the organization. He also shut down the Facebook page he had built up for NOM, which had 290,000 followers. The next day, NOM created a new official Facebook page (to replace Marinelli's), and released this statement: "Louis Marinelli worked in a volunteer capacity as a bus driver during our summer marriage tour. Around this time, NOM began to pay him as a part-time consultant for helping us expand our internet reach. He has since chosen a different focus. We wish him well." NOM president Brown publicly downplayed Marinelli's role with the organization, however, after Marinelli published several articles critical of NOM on his website, Brown contacted him and said that if the articles were not removed, NOM would pursue legal action against Marinelli for violation of a confidentiality agreement he had signed as a contractor with access to specialized information.

=== Photo manipulation ===
In October 2011, the blog Good As You showed that NOM used uncredited photographs of 2008 rallies for then-presidential candidate Barack Obama on its website to make it appear that the crowds supporting Obama were actually NOM supporters.

The story was subsequently picked up by media including The Rachel Maddow Show and Instinct Magazine. Brown dismissed the photo controversy as a misdirection effort by "Rachel Maddow and her friends on the left". NOM removed the photos in the collage, referring to one of them as "a common use photo in the public domain". The images included one Reuters photo and two that were copyrighted under a Creative Commons license requiring that the photographer be credited.

=== Wedge tactics ===
In March 2012, NOM memos dated to 2009 advocating strategies of pitting the African-American and homosexual communities against each other, of discouraging Latino assimilation into a culture accepting of same-sex marriage, and of painting President Obama as a "social radical" were released by a federal judge in Maine and published by the Human Rights Campaign. The internal NOM documents state that they seek "to drive a wedge between gays and blacks" by promoting "African American spokespeople for marriage", thus provoking same-sex marriage supporters into "denouncing these spokesmen and women as bigots", and to interrupt the assimilation of Latinos into "dominant Anglo culture" by making the stance against same-sex marriage "a key badge of Latino identity". The documents also showed a goal to "sideswipe" US President Barack Obama by depicting him as a "social radical" via issues including child protection and pornography.

The revealed tactics were described as "one of the most cynical things I've ever heard" and "scary" by Julian Bond, chairman emeritus of the NAACP. The National Black Justice Coalition said that the "documents expose N.O.M. for what it really is – a hate group determined to use African American faith leaders as pawns to push their damaging agenda".

In response to the controversy, NOM stated that the organization has a diverse base of support which includes people of "every color, creed and background" and that it has "worked with prominent African-American and Hispanic leaders, including Dr. Alveda C. King, Bishop George McKinney of the COGIC Church, Bishop Harry Jackson and the New York State Senator Reverend Rubén Díaz Sr." Gallagher, who was president of the organization at the time of the documents, said that their language "makes us sound way too big for our britches", while Brown, president at the time the controversy arose, wrote that the language was "inapt", stating that "it would be enormously arrogant for anyone at NOM to believe that we can make or provoke African-American or Latino leaders do anything".

== See also ==
- Jennifer Roback Morse
- Family Research Council

== Notes ==
1. ^{see} Southern Poverty Law Center: 10 Anti-gay Myths Debunked
