= MacManus =

MacManus is a family name that may refer to:

- Annie MacManus (a.k.a. Annie Mac) (born 1978) – Irish DJ and television presenter
- Arthur MacManus (1889–1927) – Scottish trade unionist, political activist
- Diana MacManus (born 1986) – US athlete in swimming
- Dony MacManus (fl. 1990–present) – Irish sculptor, educator
- Emily MacManus (1886–1978) – Irish nurse, OBE recipient
- Declan MacManus (a.k.a. Elvis Costello) (born 1954) – English musician, singer and songwriter (son of Ross MacManus)
- Francis MacManus (1909–1965) – Irish novelist
- Henry MacManus (c. 1810 – 1878) – Irish painter
- Joseph MacManus (1970–1992) – member in the Sligo Brigade of the Provisional Irish Republican Army
- Rosina MacManus (died 2008) – Irish supporter of Camogie Association
- Ross MacManus (1927–2011) – British musician (father of Elvis Costello)
- Seán MacManus (politician) (born 1950) – Irish political figure, father of Joseph MacManus
- Seumas MacManus (1869–1960) – Irish author, dramatist, poet
- Steve MacManus (born 1953) – British comic writer, author, editor
- Terence MacManus (c. 1811 – 1861) – Irish rebel
- Theodore F. MacManus (1872–1940) – US advertisingman
- Tristan MacManus (born 1982) – Irish dancer

== See also ==
- McManus (disambiguation)
