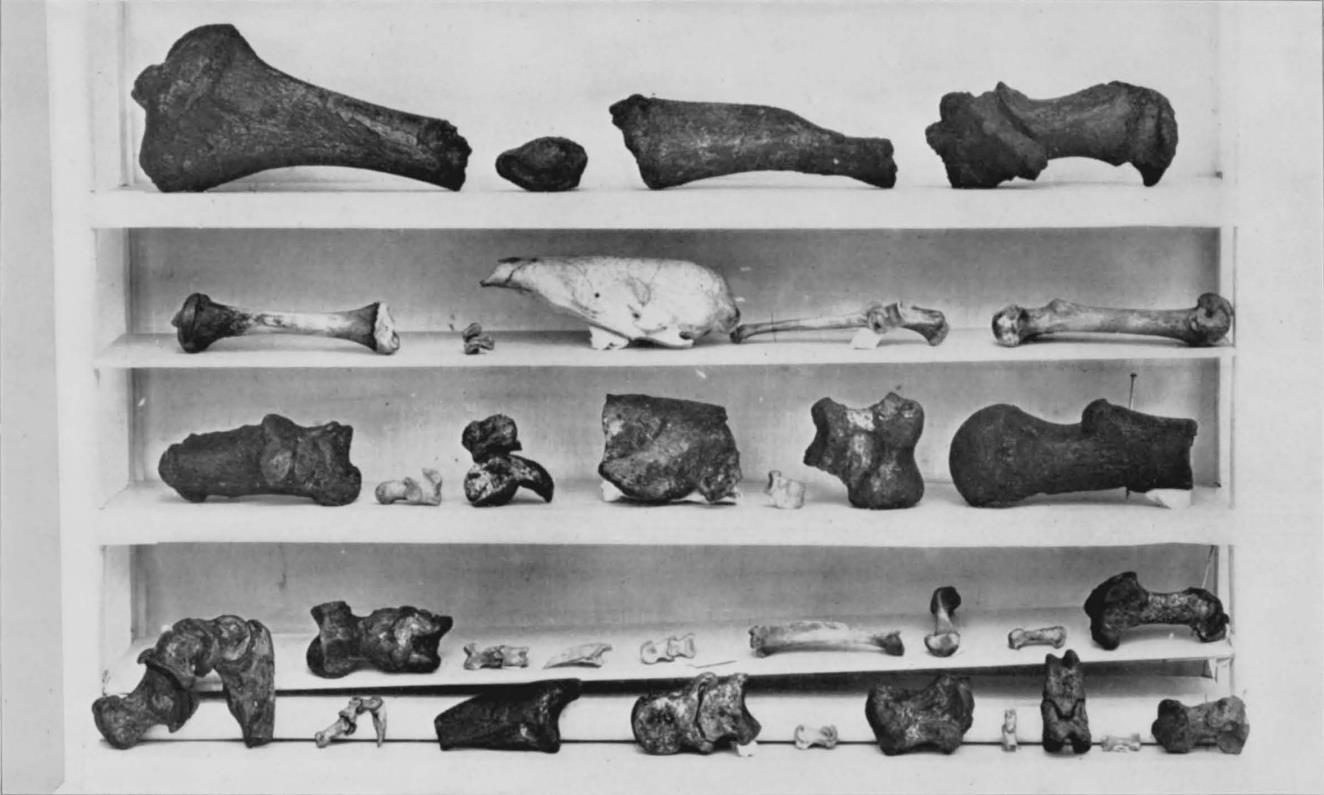
- bones of Manis palaeojavanica (darker) compared to same bones of Manis javanica (lighter)

Scientific classification
- Kingdom: Animalia
- Phylum: Chordata
- Class: Mammalia
- Order: Pholidota
- Family: Manidae
- Genus: Manis
- Subgenus: Paramanis
- Species: †M. palaeojavanica

Binomial name
- †Manis palaeojavanica Dubois, 1907

Synonyms
- list of synonyms: Manis palaejavanica (Dubois, 1908); Manis palaejavanico (Weber, 1928); Manis palaeojavanicus (Dubois, 1907); Manis paleojavanica (Raven, 1935)

= Manis palaeojavanica =

Manis palaeojavanica Temporal range: Late Pleistocene

Extinct species of pangolin

Manis palaeojavanica (literally "ancient Javan pangolin"), is an extinct species of gigantic pangolin that was native to Southeast Asia during the Late Pleistocene epoch.

In 1926, E. Dubois described the bones of M. palaeojavanica discovered in Java. Later, Lord Medway excavated another set of bones at the Niah Caves in Malaysia. In 1960, D. A. Hoojier identified these bones as that of an extinct species. Using carbon dating, the Niah Caves bones were determined to be 42,000–47,000 years old.

M. palaeojavanica is known from a nearly complete skeleton, one of only a small handful of largely complete pangolin fossils. Its total length is measured up to 2.5 m (8.2 ft).
