= World Congress of Families =

American religious right-wing organization

International Organization for the Family
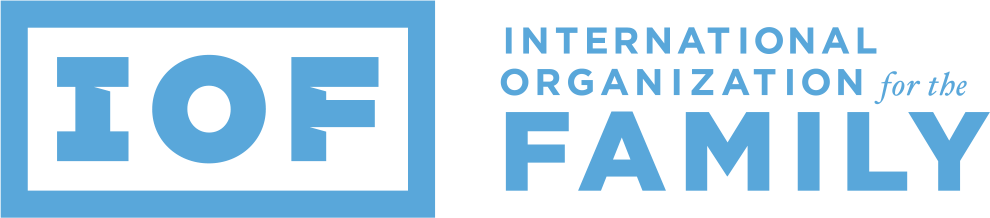
- Founded: 1997
- Location: Rockford, Illinois, U.S.
- Key people: International Secretary, Allan C. Carlson
- Website: www.worldcongress.org

The World Congress of Families (WCF) is an international conference that promotes Christian right values internationally. The WCF is the main event of the International Organization for the Family and focuses on issues like opposition to divorce, birth control, same-sex marriage, pornography, and abortion, while supporting a society built on "the voluntary union of a man and a woman in a lifelong covenant of marriage". WCF comprises organizations in several countries, and most of its member partners are strongly active campaigners against abortion rights and same-sex marriage. WCF was formed in 1997 and is active worldwide, regularly organizing conventions. Its opposition to gay marriage and abortion has attracted criticism.

In 2014, following its involvement with the 2013 Russian anti-LGBTQ law, the Southern Poverty Law Center added WCF to the list of organizations it considers as anti-LGBT groups. WCF has also been influential in Africa. A 2015 report by Human Rights Campaign pointed to WCF's influence on anti-LGBT laws in Nigeria and Uganda, while the director of the NGO Rightify Ghana noted in 2021 that, after the WCF conference in Ghana's capital city of Accra in late 2019, "there was a rush to push legislation" against LGBT in Ghana. The organization has received funding from sanctioned Russian oligarchs.

== Background ==
Allan C. Carlson, President of the Howard Center for Family, Religion and Society, initiated the congress on the basis of article 16c of the Universal Declaration of Human Rights, saying: "The family is the natural and fundamental group unit of society and is entitled to protection by society and the state". According to WCF, its purpose is to "stand up for the position of the traditional family, in a time of eroding family life and declining appreciation for families in general". The coalition defines "the natural family" as the "union of a man and a woman in a lifelong covenant of marriage" and works with other organizations, previously including the World Family Policy Center at Brigham Young University (BYU) to promote its views. The Human Rights Campaign called WCF "one of the most influential groups in America promoting and coordinating the exportation of anti-LGBT bigotry, ideology, and legislation abroad" and stated that their international conferences comprise "the most fringe activists engaged in anti-LGBT extremism". According to the HRC, the WCF and its affiliates are also linked to anti-LGBT advocacy in numerous countries, including on the Uganda Anti-Homosexuality Act, the Russian LGBT propaganda law, and Nigeria.

The WCF is controversial for its opposition to legal protections on the basis of sexual orientation, opposition to same sex marriage, and support for policies against homosexuality in Russia. It was added to the SPLC's list of active hate groups in 2014. The WCF responded to hate group designations by publishing a report addressing the 25-plus accusations made by the SPLC and the Human Rights Campaign (HRC), including their labeling the WCF as a hate group. In response to the WCF report, Ty Cobb, director of HRC Global, stated "WCF's explanations do little to mask its record of anti-LGBT rhetoric or those of organizations it partners with around the world."

== History ==
The WCF has organized conferences since 1997.

Following initial planning in 2010, the WCF sponsored the July 2011 Moscow Demographic Summit, which formulated a communique calling on governments to develop "a pro-family demographic policy and to adopt a special international pro-family strategy and action plan aimed at consolidating family and marriage, protecting human life from conception to natural death, increasing birth rates, and averting the menace of depopulation."

In London in 2012, the WCF were refused permission to hire out the facilities of the Law Society for an event entitled One man. One woman. Making the case for marriage for the good of society, and had to find an alternative venue.

In 2013, Mark Kirk, the Republican Senator for Illinois revoked the WCF access to a Senate meeting room in the U.S. Capitol.

In February 2014, the Southern Poverty Law Center (SPLC) included WCF in their listing of anti-gay hate groups. As of August 2014, the WCF partners listing includes several groups that are also listed as anti-gay hate groups by the SPLC, including American Family Association, Family Research Council, Family Watch International, and Americans for Truth About Homosexuality.

Larry Jacobs was invited to Russia to advise Russian Orthodox leaders in setting up Christian right coalitions that unite Protestant Evangelical and Roman Catholic groups opposing legalized abortion. Larry Jacobs has been a strong advocate of the Russian LGBT propaganda law, commenting that "The Russians might be the Christian saviors of the world" The coalition stated "Russia, with its historic commitment to deep spirituality and morality, can be a hope for the natural family supporters from all over the world" Jacobs commented that "The Kremlin used to be a no-no for conservatives," but added "We're going to redeem that building."

In 2016 WCF rebranded with an umbrella organization called International Organization for the Family.

=== WCF World Conferences ===
Edition	Host xity	Year held	Attendees
I	Prague, Czech Republic	1997	700
II	Geneva, Switzerland	1999	1,600
III	Mexico City, Mexico	2004	3,300
IV	Warsaw, Poland	2007	3,900
V	Amsterdam, Netherlands	2009	
VI	Madrid, Spain	2012	
VII	Sydney, Australia	2013	
VIII	Moscow, Russia	2014 (cancelled)	
IX	Salt Lake City, United States	2015	
X	Tbilisi, Georgia	2016	
XI	Budapest, Hungary	2017	
XII	Chișinău, Moldova	2018	
XIII	Verona, Italy	2019	
XIII	Accra, Ghana	2019	
XIV	Mexico City, Mexico	2022	

The meeting in Warsaw in May 2007 was to be addressed by Ellen Sauerbrey, at the time head of the United States Department of State's Bureau of Population, Refugees, and Migration, which provoked a letter from 19 Members of the European Parliament demanding that she should not go.

The 2009 conference in Amsterdam met with some controversy when the government minister André Rouvoet addressed the congress despite requests from other Dutch Parliamentarians that he should not do so. Their local offices were defaced with paint, obscenities and anti-Christian slogans by unknown vandals, but the WCF said they would “not be intimidated by radical opposition”. The WCF comprises Christian, Islamic, and secular leaders, and the Chief Rabbi of the Netherlands was scheduled to speak at the conference.

Prior to the 2013 WCF conference, Sydney politician Alex Greenwich sought to ensure that the conference complied with anti-discrimination legislation. One of the reports presented to the conference said that children raised in two-parent families do best at school.

The 2014 WCF conference was scheduled to be held in September in Russia, and was promoted as "the 'Olympics' of the international Pro-Life movement supporting the Natural Family". Because of the annexation of Ukrainian Crimea by Russia, planning for the conference was suspended.

Writer Masha Gessen attended the 2016 conference, and reported participants embracing white replacement worries expressed in the language of human extinction, and concerns that backers of gender ideology would overthrow the government—ideas described as conspiracy theories and moral panics.

The 2017 WCF conference was held in Hungary. The right wing Prime minister of Hungary Viktor Orban spoke at the event.

The 2019 WCF conference was held in March in Verona, Italy. The deputy prime minister and leader of the League Matteo Salvini spoke at the event with a speech that spanned topics from population decline to illegal immigration and a critique of feminism. Scheduled speakers included Moldova's president Igor Dodon, Hungary's Families Minister Katalin Novak, and Dmitri Smirnov, a senior figure in the Russian Orthodox Church.

=== WCF Regional Conferences ===
In August 2014, the WCF held a regional conference in Melbourne Australia that was met with protests. The Senate of Australia passed a motion to condemn the conference after several MPs and government ministers announced their intention to speak at the conference and four successive venues refused to host the conference. Federal social services minister Kevin Andrews was noted by the Senate as a recipient of the WCF's "Natural Family Man of the Year" award. Four of these ministers later pulled out of the conference because the conference was hosted by the controversial Christian group Catch the Fire. Kevin Andrews, who was the international ambassador for the 2013 conference, has been promoted as the international ambassador for the World Congress of Families. (Note: The Howard Center listed Andrews as an ambassador in 2013. In March 2014 the WCF referred to Andrews as the international Ambassador: The Age referred to marketing materials on July 15. The Sydney Morning Herald made reference on July 25.) After the conference, Andrews asked the WCF to remove a reference to him as "international ambassador" from their promotional material.

The WCF held an African Regional Conference in Ghana in 2019.

== Gallery ==
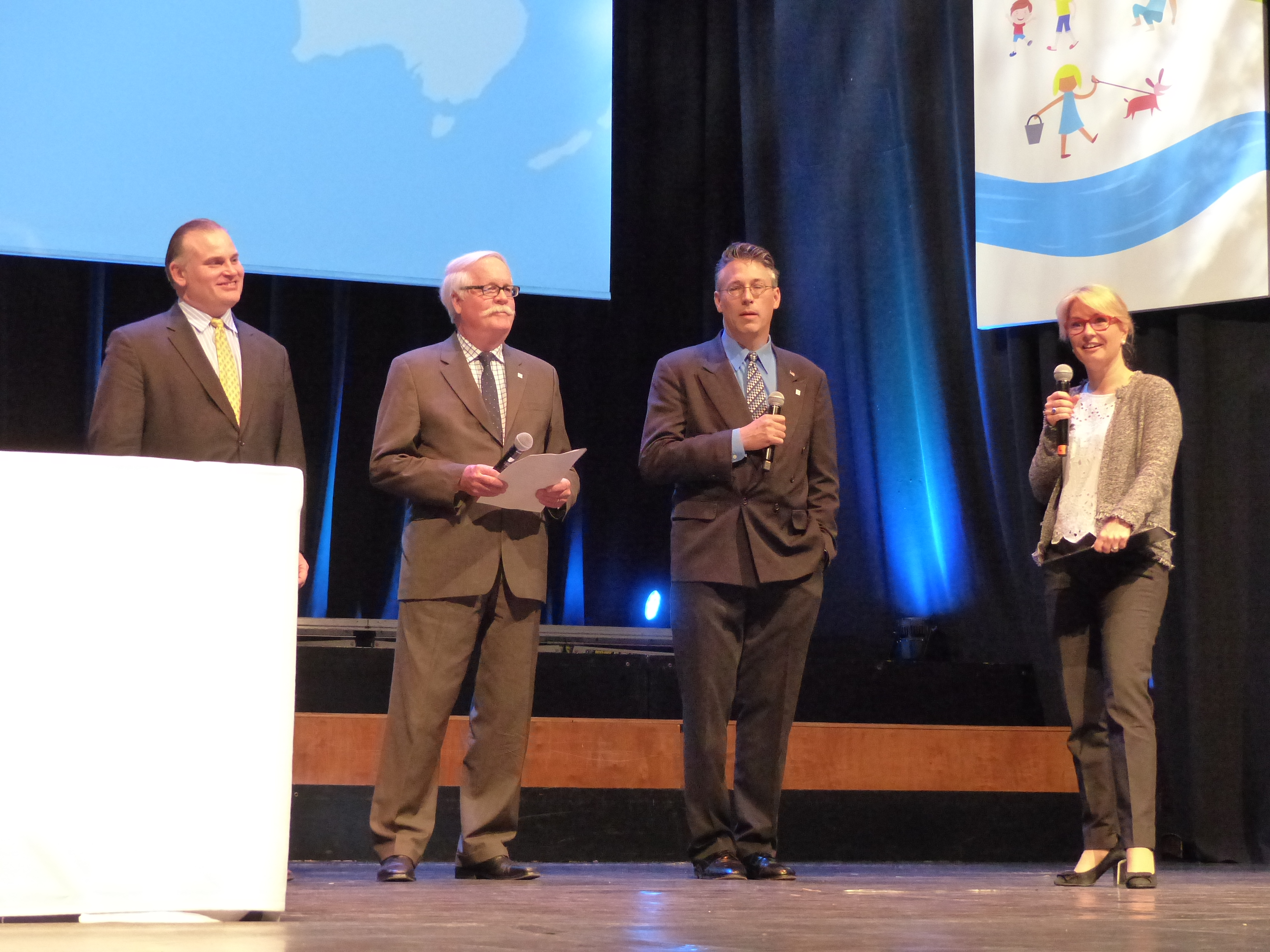
Larry Jakobs, Brian Brown, Allan C. Carlson - World Congress of Families XI

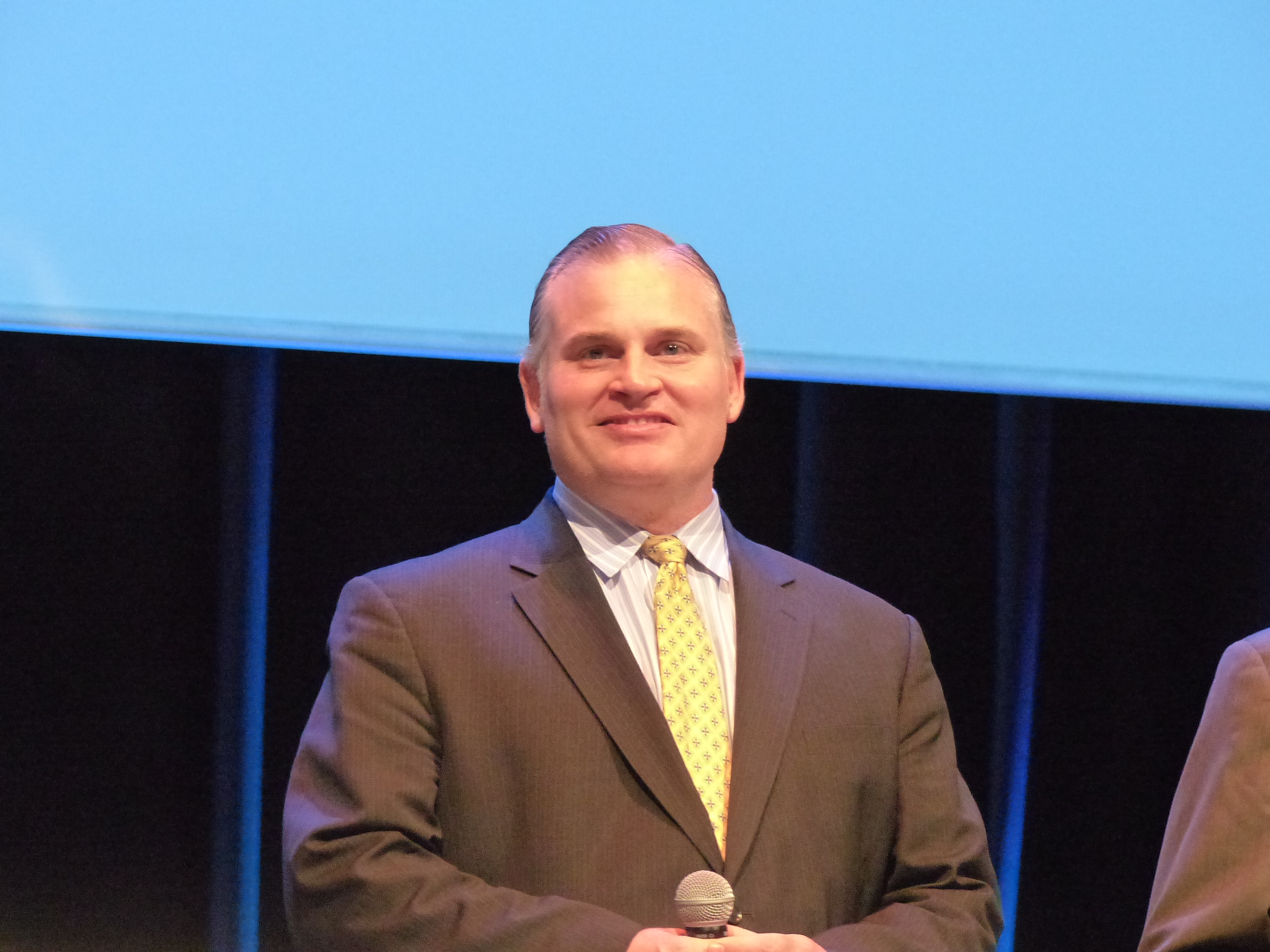
Brian Brown

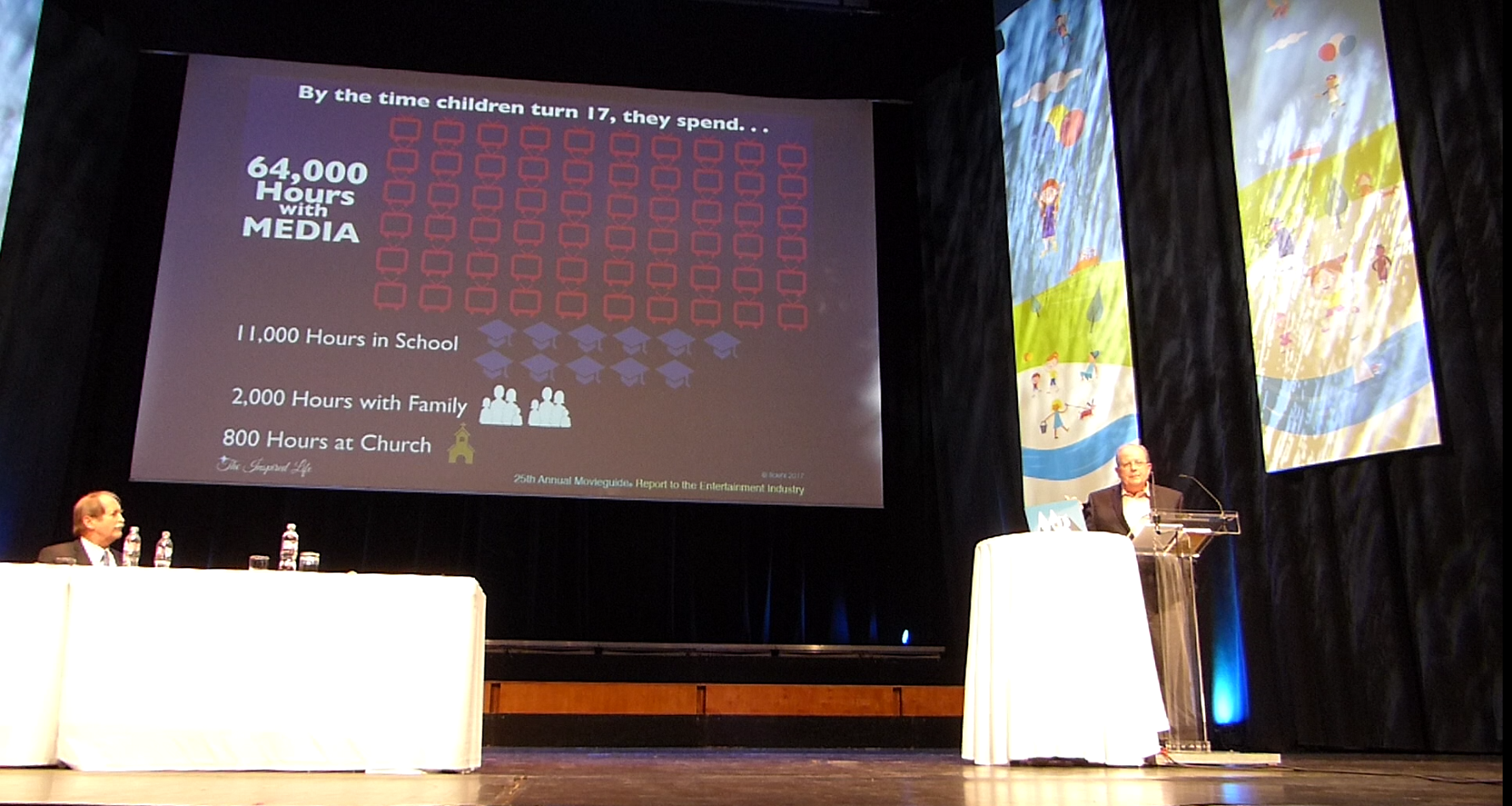
Ted Baehr

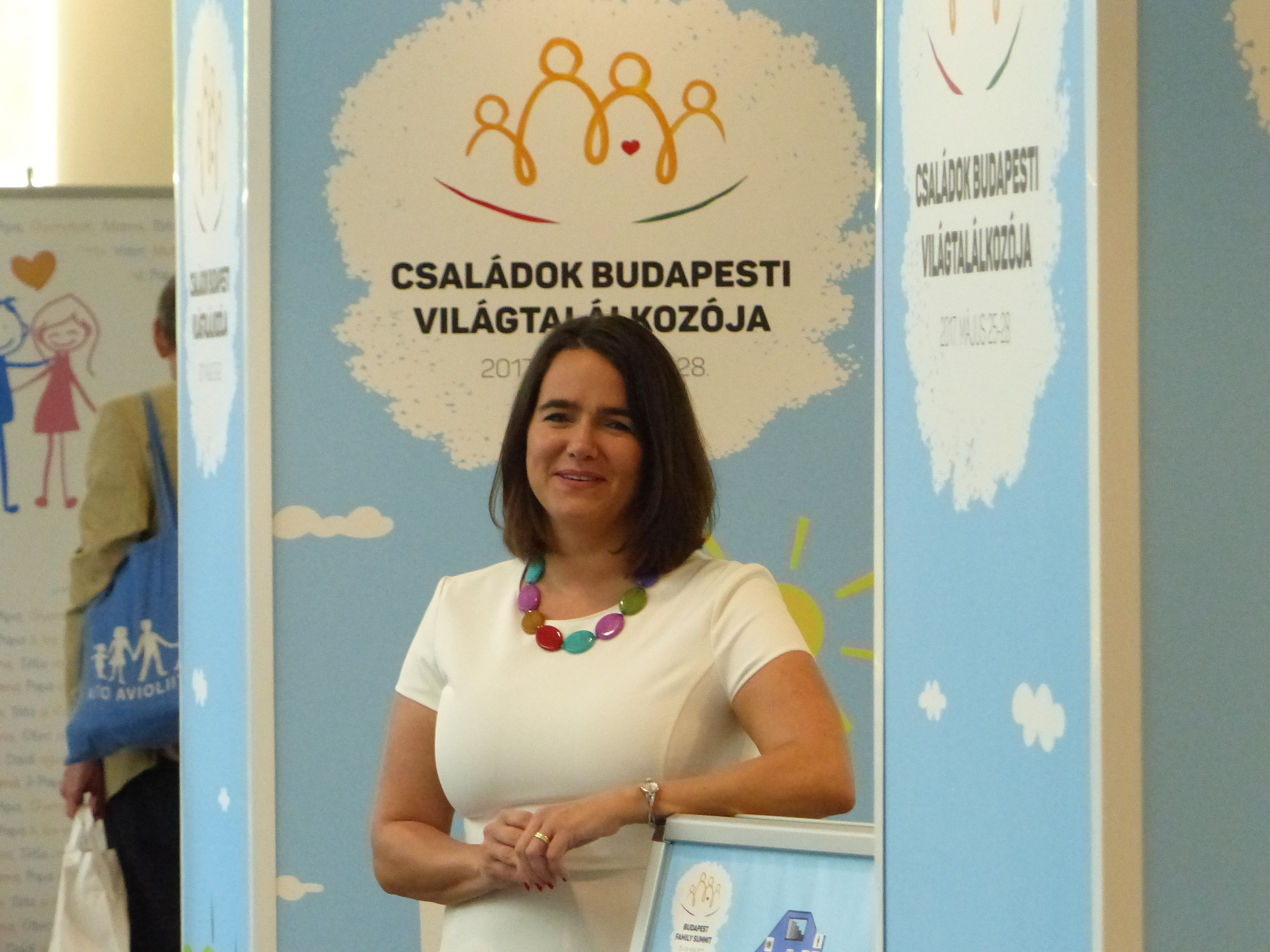
Novák Katalin

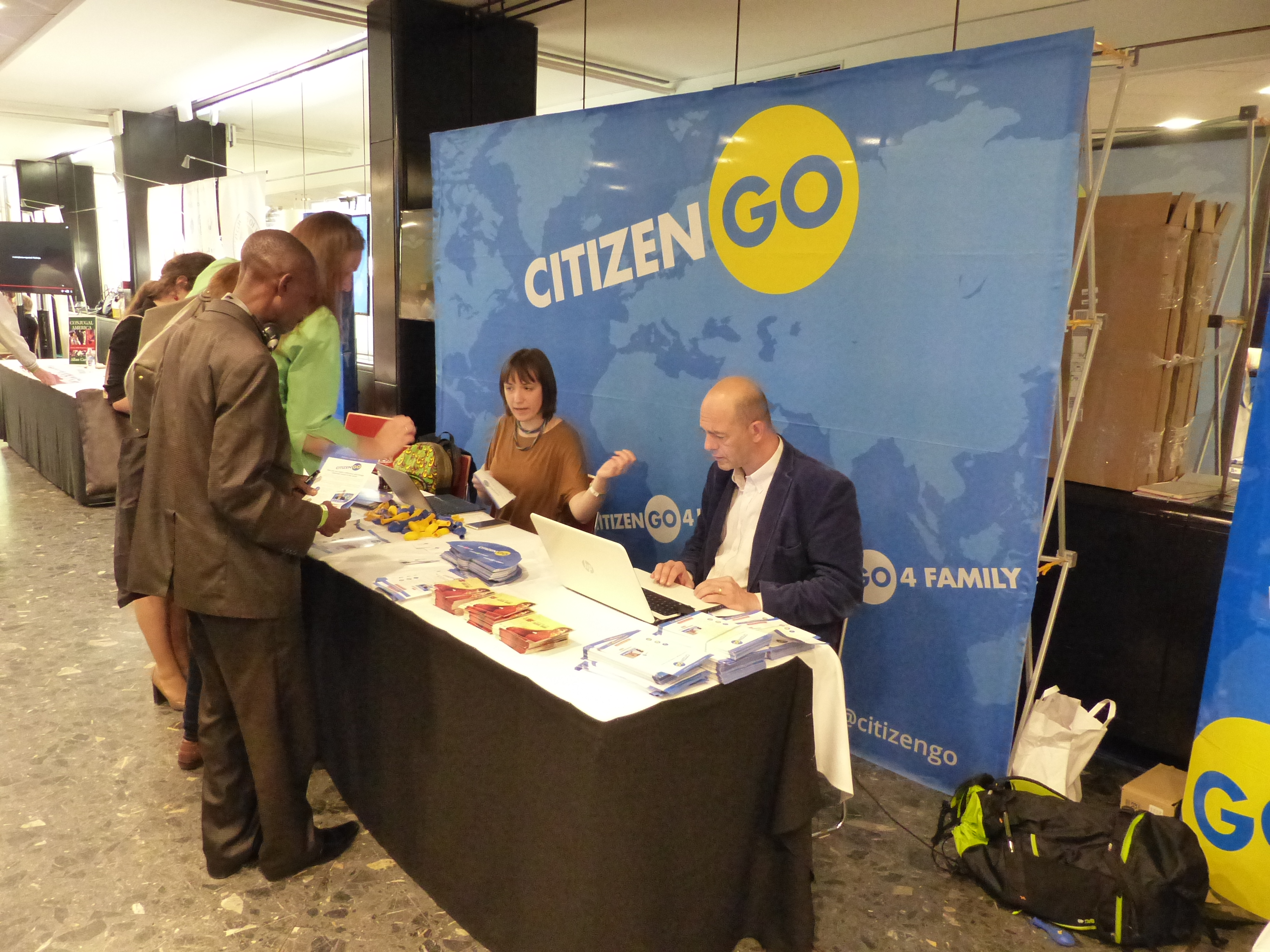
CitizenGo

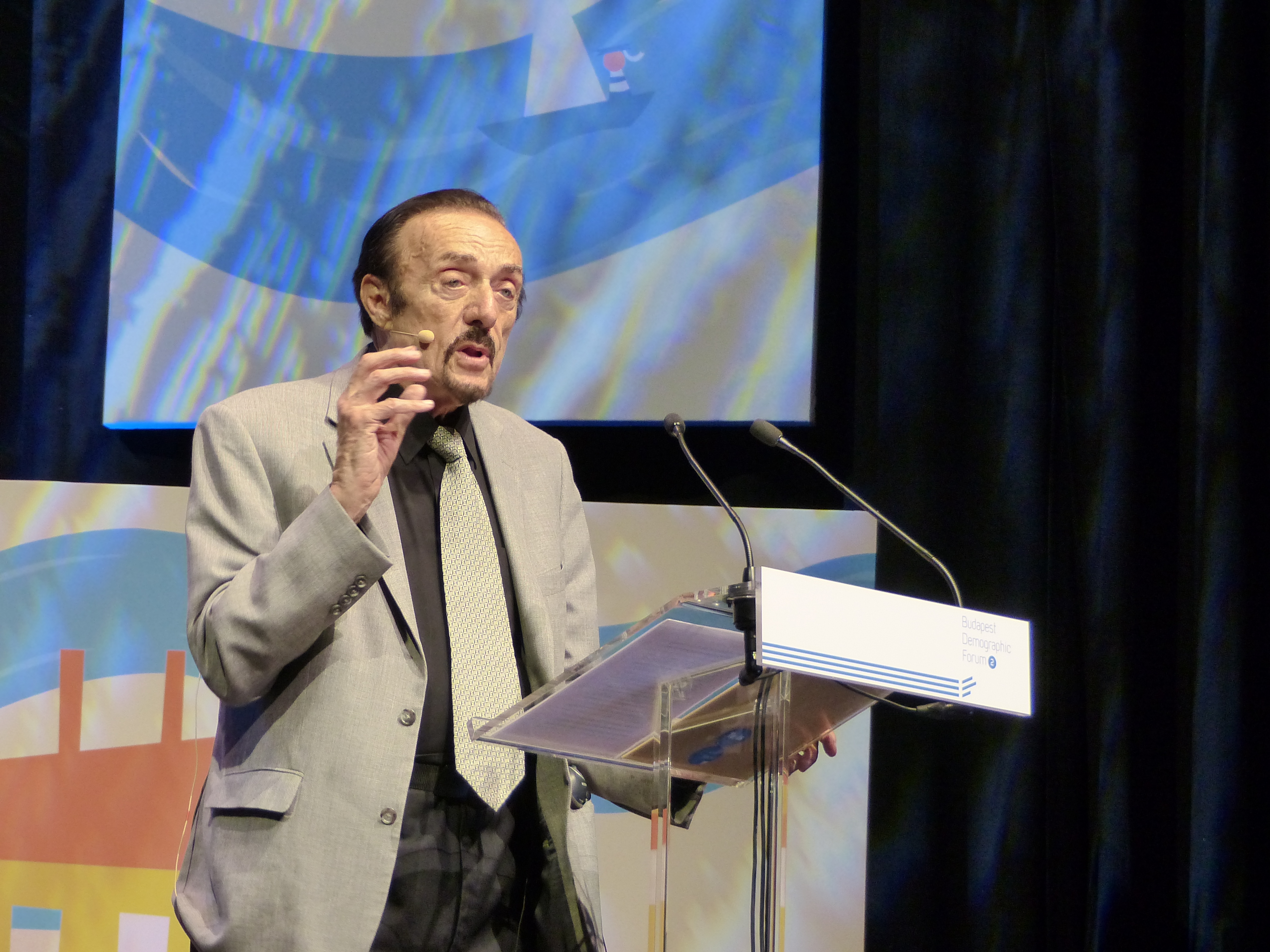
Philip Zimbardo

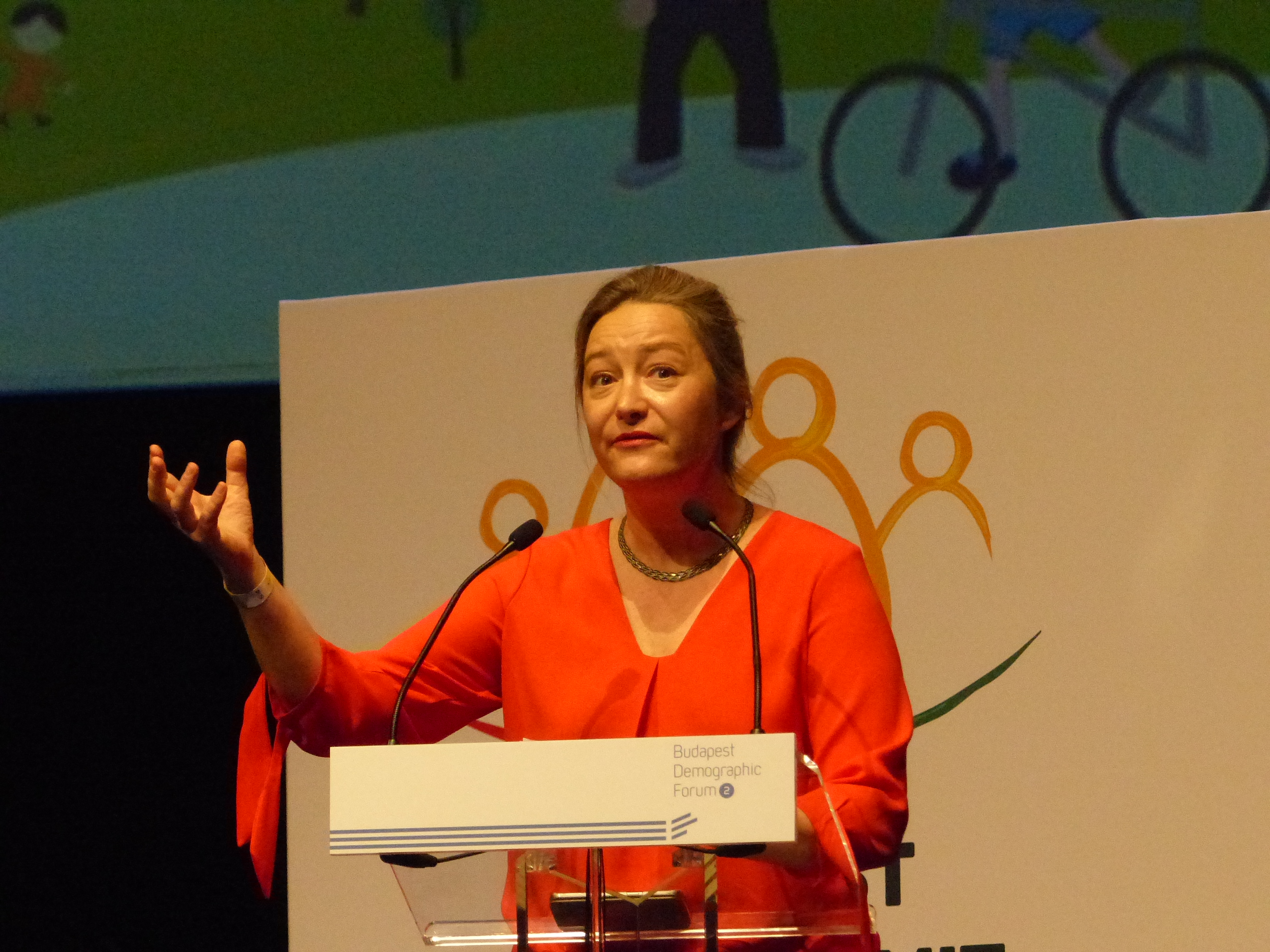
Ludovine de La Rochère

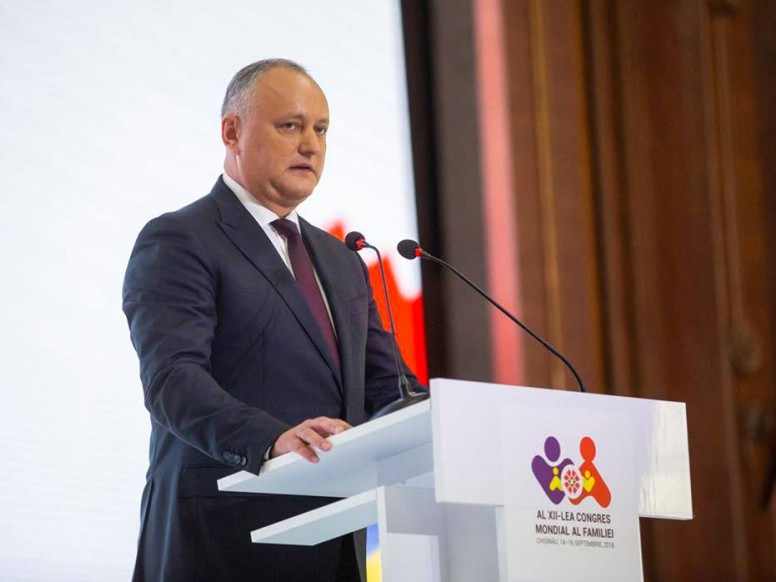
Moldovan President Igor Dodon speaking at the 2018 WCF
