= Francis J. McManus =

Canadian politician

Francis James McManus (January 11, 1844 – September 12, 1897) was a political figure in New Brunswick, Canada. He represented Gloucester County in the Legislative Assembly of New Brunswick from 1878 to 1886 as a Liberal member.

He was born in Memramcook, New Brunswick, the son of Terence McManus, and was educated at Saint Joseph's College, Saint Dunstan's College, Saint Michael's College and the Grande Seminaire de la Montagne in Montreal. In 1876, he married Marie Hachey.
