= MV Magnum =

History
- Name: Znamya Oktyabra (1979–2009); Magnum (from 2009)
- Owner: Magnum Shipping Ltd.
- Operator: Magnum Shipping Ltd.
- Port of registry: (Cambodia) Phnom Penh
- Yard number: 107
- Completed: 15 June 1979
- Home port: Phnom Penh, Cambodia
- Identification: IMO number: 7636767
- Status: in active service

General characteristics
- Type: Cargo ship
- Tonnage: 2827 GT
- Displacement: 4750 tons
- Length: 118.8 metres LOA
- Draught: 3.73 m
- Depth: 6.0 m
- Decks: 1
- Propulsion: 1 6NVDS 48A-2U diesel engine
- Speed: 11.3 knots (20.9 km/h)
- Capacity: 1,642 cubic metres

MV Magnum is a cargo ship in service with Magnum Shipping of Belize City, Belize. It was built in 1979 and initially in service with a Russian shipping company and was, until 2009, known as Znamya Oktyabra (meaning Banner of October). It is configured to carry wood or wood products, and is based in Phnom Penh, Cambodia. Its callsign is XUNA3.
