= Maggie Gallagher =

American writer (born 1960)

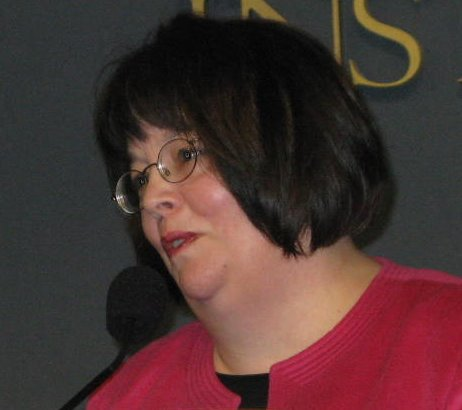
- Gallagher in 2010
- Education: Yale University (BA)

Margaret Gallagher is an American writer, political commentator, and activist. She wrote a syndicated column for Universal Press Syndicate from 1995 to 2013 and has written several books. Gallagher founded the Institute for Marriage and Public Policy, a small, socially conservative think tank. She is also a co-founder of the National Organization for Marriage (NOM), an advocacy group which opposes same-sex marriage and other legal recognition of same-sex partnerships; she has served as president and as chairman of the board of NOM.

== Biography ==
Maggie Gallagher's parents were initially active in their local Catholic parish, but her mother left the Catholic Church when Gallagher was eight years of age. As a young person, Gallagher was influenced by the works of Ayn Rand and Robert A. Heinlein.

In 1982, Gallagher earned a B.A. in religious studies from Yale University, where she belonged to the Party of the Right in the Yale Political Union. Shortly before she was due to graduate, Gallagher became pregnant after a relationship with a fellow party member. She gave birth to a son out of wedlock. She initially planned to put the baby up for adoption, but then changed her mind. Neither of the parents thought they should marry. According to Gallagher, her son's father eventually abandoned her and became uninterested in their child.

In her twenties, Gallagher reverted to Catholicism because her experience as a single mother made her consider the necessity of fathers and the link of sex to procreation. Gallagher married Raman Srivastav, a Hindu, in 1993. They have one son together.

Gallagher attended the premiere reading of 8, Dustin Lance Black's play about the trial surrounding California's Proposition 8, where a depiction of her was performed by Jayne Houdyshell. She expressed the opinion that most people would find the work "kind of dull".

== Career ==
Early in her career, Gallagher wrote for National Review. She later worked at the City Journal, a public policy magazine and website. In 1995, she began writing a nationally syndicated column. Gallagher joined the Institute for American Values (IAV) in 1996. She later left IAV and founded the Institute for Marriage and Public Policy, a conservative think tank whose slogan is "strengthening marriage for a new generation." As of May 2011, Gallagher was president of the Institute for Marriage and Public Policy. Gallagher also co-founded the National Organization for Marriage (NOM). She was President of NOM from its founding until 2010, and she remained on the organization's board until August 2011. In 2013, the Huffington Post described Gallagher as a "leading gay marriage opponent".

In 2011, Gallagher founded the Culture War Victory Fund and served as the fund's director.

On January 2, 2013, she announced the retirement of her syndicated column, then distributed by Universal Uclick.

Gallagher later worked for the American Principles Project. In 2017, she was hired at the Benedict XVI Institute for Sacred Music and Divine Worship. She has authored several books.

== Views ==
Gallagher is a Roman Catholic and a social conservative. She is a signatory of the Manhattan Declaration, a November 2009 ecumenical statement calling on Orthodox, Catholic, and Evangelical Christians not to comply with rules and laws permitting abortion, same-sex marriage and other matters against their religious consciences.

=== Views on abortion ===
Gallagher opposes abortion and supported overturning Roe v. Wade. She believes that most people who support legal abortion do so reluctantly because they think it is a necessary evil. Roe v. Wade was overturned in 2022.

=== Views on assisted suicide ===
Gallagher opposes the legalization of assisted suicide such as the Death with Dignity Act or voluntary euthanasia. Gallagher believes that state-approved suicide diminishes the value of life, especially for the elderly, sick, or vulnerable.

=== Views on marriage and same-sex relationships ===
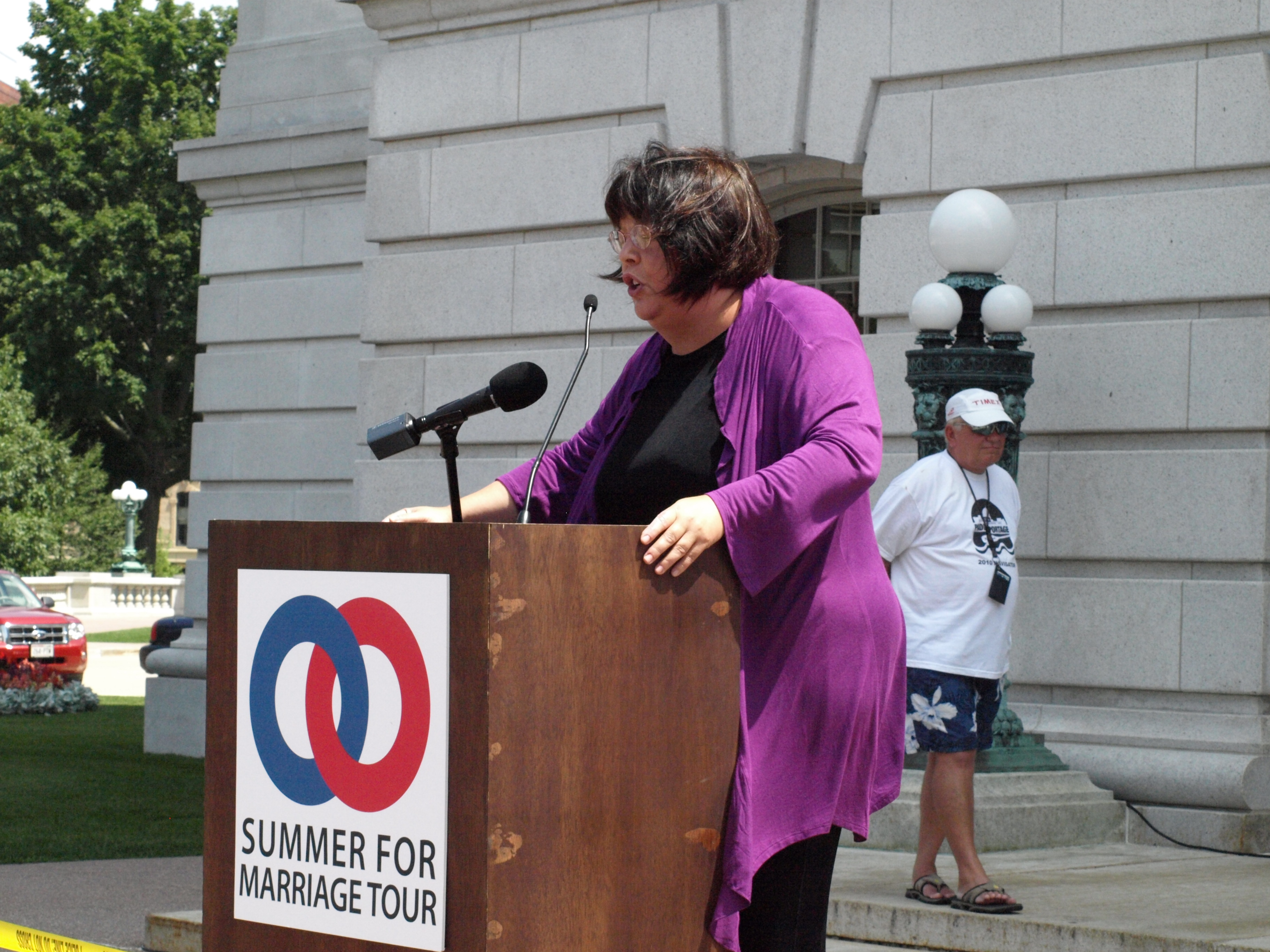
Gallagher speaking at a July 2010 National Organization for Marriage event at the Wisconsin State Capitol

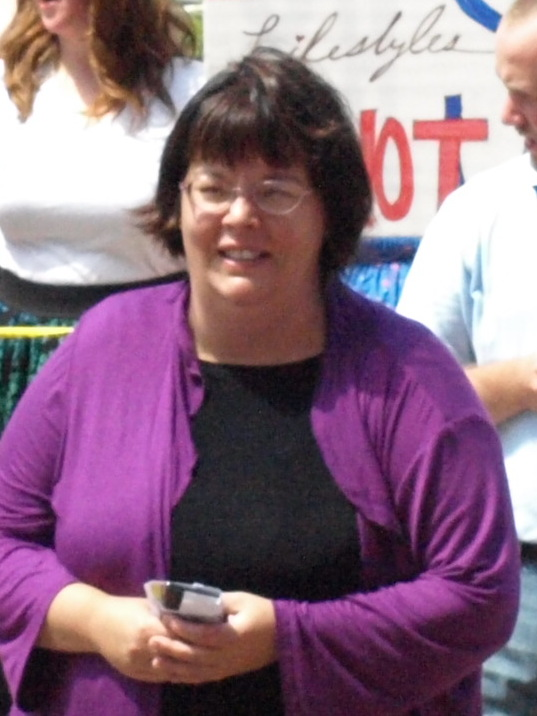
Gallagher at the Wisconsin State Capitol in July 2010

Gallagher has strongly opposed the legal recognition of same-sex unions and written books toward that end. She holds that one of the purposes of marriage is always procreation and rearing children exclusively by heterosexual parents, and argues that same-sex unions diminish the value of heterosexual marriages. Gallagher has compared winning the fight to ban same-sex marriage with the fall of communism and has held that the legalization of same-sex marriage would mean "losing American civilization".

Gallagher advocates litigation against spouses who commit adultery and opposes laws which facilitate no-fault divorce.

Gallagher has written that "[w]e need a social institution, endowed with public authority, that teaches young men and women [...] that they need to come together in love to raise the children their bodies make together. If this is a core purpose of marriage, then same-sex unions are not marriages. If gay unions are marriages, then this is no longer what marriage is about." Further, Gallagher has written that same-sex marriage is "rooted in a false equation: Loving a man is not the same as loving a woman; a sexual union that can give rise to children is fundamentally different in kind than a union not so freighted, for good and for ill, with the fact of procreativity."

In October 2006, Gallagher suggested that gay rights groups stop promoting same-sex marriage and start vigorously advocating for civil unions. In 2010, she expressed her support for certain kinds of civil unions for same-sex couples but not available for opposite-sex couples. However, in 2012, she supported North Carolina's Amendment 1, a state constitutional amendment that banned recognition of both same-sex marriages and civil unions.

Gallagher believes that many people in the LGBT community, specifically gay men, choose to oppose what they label as the "heteronormative" constraints of a monogamous relationship, with reference to Eric Erbelding's assertion that the married gay couples he knows are "for the most part monogamous, but for maybe a casual three-way".

Gallagher has asserted that same-sex marriage is worse than polygamy, which "for all its ugly defects, is an attempt to secure stable mother-father families for children". She has also written that "once the principle [of same-sex marriage] is in the law, the next step will be to use the law to stigmatize, marginalize, and repress those who disagree with the government’s new views on marriage and sexual orientation." As an example, she has cited efforts by LGBT advocates to revoke the tax-exempt status of churches that oppose same-sex marriage.

On April 8, 2009, Gallagher appeared on the NBC television show Hardball with Chris Matthews to debate the issue of same-sex marriage. During that appearance, Gallagher said, "Marriage is the only institution we have that's about bringing together the two great halves of humanity, male and female, so that children can know and be known by and love and be loved by their own mother and father."

In 2015, Gallagher stated that she would not attend a same-sex wedding if she ever invited to one.

=== Views on sexuality and sex education ===
Gallagher believes that teaching abstinence (encouraging celibacy until legally married) should be the sole sex education curriculum. She does not believe in instructing students in birth control or how to prevent STDs through use of condoms or safe-sex techniques and has advocated discontinuing all safer-sex education in public schools.

Gallagher has stated that "[s]exual orientation is almost certainly unchosen", but that the decision to act on that desire and to incorporate it into one's identity is a choice that bears moral reflection. She believes that "sexual desire is not its own justification" for acceptance or legal recognition of same-sex relationships.

On a February 2012 edition of Up with Chris Hayes on which Gallagher appeared for a segment on the revival of the "culture wars", Gallagher was asked by The Nation editor Richard Kim about her support of gay reparative therapy. Gallagher denied having ever supported ex-gay therapy and claimed that Kim was "making stuff up". Kim subsequently quoted from a 2001 column written by Gallagher praising Robert Spitzer for his research on the possibilities of ex-gay therapy and calling on then-President George W. Bush to support federal funding for research into ex-gay therapy. In 2013, after blogging her support for Chuck Limandri's representation of JONAH (a Jewish organization that offered support to persons with unwanted same-sex attraction), Gallagher made the following comments regarding conversion therapy:

I don’t back something called "conversion therapy." I don’t even really know what conversion therapy is, and I’m not qualified to express an opinion on a particular kind of therapy. I back the right of gay people to seek the kind of counseling help they want, not the kind the [Southern Poverty Law Center] lawyers want them to have, including help to live their sexual lives with integrity, according to their own values, not the SPLC's values. That's all.

=== Views on single parenting ===
When then-Vice President Dan Quayle in 1992 criticized the fictional television character Murphy Brown for being an unwed mother, Gallagher wrote an op-ed for The New York Times, "An Unwed Mother for Quayle", in his defense.

=== Views on the 2012 presidential election ===
Gallagher's endorsement of candidate Rick Santorum in the 2012 Republican presidential primaries was promoted by the Santorum campaign.

== Federal contracts ==
Gallagher received tens of thousands of dollars from the Department of Health and Human Services during 2002 and 2003 for helping the George W. Bush administration promote the President's Healthy Marriage Initiative. Gallagher testified before Congress in favor of "healthy marriage" programs but never disclosed the payments. When asked about that situation, she replied, "Did I violate journalistic ethics by not disclosing it? I don't know. You tell me…frankly, it never occurred to me."

After The Washington Post revealed this information on January 26, 2005, Gallagher claimed significant differences between her situation and that of conservative columnist Armstrong Williams. She went on to add, "I should have disclosed a government contract when I later wrote about the Bush marriage initiative. I would have, if I had remembered it. My apologies to my readers."

Gallagher received an additional $20,000 from the Bush administration for writing a report, titled Can Government Strengthen Marriage?, for the National Fatherhood Initiative, a private organization.

== Bibliography ==
Listed by original publication date:

- Enemies of Eros: How the Sexual Revolution Is Killing Family, Marriage, and Sex and What We Can Do About It (1989). ISBN 0-929387-00-7.
- The Abolition of Marriage: How We Destroy Lasting Love (1996). ISBN 0-89526-464-1.
- The Age of Unwed Mothers: Is Teen Pregnancy the Problem?: A Report to the Nation (1999). ISBN 0-9659841-5-X.
- The Case for Marriage: Why Married People Are Happier, Healthier, and Better Off Financially with Linda J. Waite (2001). ISBN 0-7679-0632-2.
- The Case for Staying Married with Linda J. Waite (2005). ISBN 0-19-516929-8.
- Debating Same-Sex Marriage with John Corvino (2012). New York: Oxford University Press. ISBN 978-0-19-975631-5.

== See also ==
- Michael McManus
- Armstrong Williams
- Bush administration payment of columnists
