= Third Ways =

2007 book by Allan C. Carlson

- Author: Allan C. Carlson
- Publisher: ISI Books
- Publication date: 2007
- ISBN: 9781952410932

Third Ways: How Bulgarian Greens, Swedish Housewives, and Beer-Swilling Englishmen Created Family-Centered Economies – and Why They Disappeared is a book which looks at twentieth century alternatives to unrestricted capitalism on the one hand, and totalitarian systems such as communism, socialism, and fascism on the other. It was written by Allan C. Carlson and published by ISI Books in 2007.

== Distributism ==
Distributism is an approach to an economics based on widely distributed ownership of property inspired by the 1891 encyclical Rerum novarum of Pope Leo XIII. After reviewing latter assessments of the distributism as fantastical, reactionary, unspecific, simplistic, frivolous, and a literary distraction, Carlson shows how the policies of distributism were grounded in Catholic Social Teaching, were concretely laid out and practical. Moreover, the writings of distributist authors Hilaire Belloc and G. K. Chesterton were influential on public policy throughout the world in the later 20th century and were in some respects prophetic. He suggests that the legacy of distributism includes British policies aimed at increasing home ownership, as well as the US Home Owners Loan Act of 1933, as well as the Federal Housing Administration, although noting failures in efforts to restore peasantries.
