= James McManus (Iowa politician) =

American politician (1804–1879)

James McManus (10 November 1804 – 15 February 1879) was an American politician.

McManus was born in Newark, Delaware, on 10 November 1804. He settled on Long Island, New York, where he worked as a stonemason at Fort Hamilton. McManus married Mystic, Connecticut native Sarah Whittlesey on 10 March 1831. He moved to what is now Iowa in the 1830s, and sent for his wife and seven children the following year. They lived in Davenport, and owned a farm.

Politically, McManus was affiliated with the Whigs and served in the first convocation of the Iowa General Assembly in 1846 as a member of the Iowa House of Representatives. He was also the founding treasurer and a founding trustee of Iowa College, established in the same year. McManus died on 15 February 1879.
