= Manis (given name) =

Manis is a given name. Notable people with the name include:

- Manis Friedman (born 1946), dean of the Bais Chana Women International and host of Torah Forum
- Manis (Morris) Jacobs, first rabbi of Congregation Shangarai Chasset of New Orleans
- Manis Lamond (born 1966), a striker for the Sydney United Football Club
