= Mike McManus (columnist) =

American writer

Michael McManus (born June 11, 1941) is the author of "Ethics & Religion", a socially conservative but economic liberal syndicated opinion column which appears in several small and mid-range US publications. The column, archives of which are linked below, is shaped much like a 'gathering point' of views; quotes from prominent conservative activists make up the bulk of each. McManus, an evangelical Christian, is also the founder and president of Marriage Savers, a non-profit organization that purports to prepare couples for marriage. McManus previously wrote syndicated columns called "Solutions" and the "Northern Perspective."

== Stance on issues ==
McManus has addressed many modern social, ethical and political issues in his column. Among his published views are:

- Gay marriage: McManus has described LGBT relationships as "sordid", "tawdry", "lewd" and a "perversion". He opposes both gay marriage and civil unions, or any legal recognition of same-sex relationships, pointing to "the tyranny of unelected judges redefining marriage" and claims that same-sex parenting is "harmful to children."
- Abortion: McManus is definitively anti-abortion.
- Divorce: McManus is an opponent of the no-fault divorce law. He believes that "Most divorces are filed by one person who alleges incompatibility, while the other spouse wants to save the marriage. Sadly, divorce is always granted. This column has long advocated that in cases involving children, when adultery or abuse is not alleged, divorce should only be granted if there is 'mutual consent' by husband and wife. What was entered into by two people, should not be ended, unless both people agree."
- Gun control: McManus is critical of what he describes as America's "weak gun control" and says it is time to "re-introduce an assault weapon ban, a national limit of one gun a month to anyone, an expansion of the Brady law to include gun show sales and a required check on mental backgrounds of buyers."
- Pornography: McManus has said that it is a major factor in breakup of marriages.

== Government payout controversy ==
On January 28, 2005, it was discovered that McManus was one of three media figures to accept money from the George W. Bush administration for targeted public endorsements of government policy.

McManus was the third person to be implicated in an article by The Los Angeles Times. It was revealed that McManus, who is a self-described "marriage advocate", was paid through a subcontractor of the Department of Health and Human Services to endorse a Bush-approved initiative defining marriage as strictly between a man and a woman. The payments were said to be $4,000 plus travel expenses, with an additional $49,000 paid to his organization, "Marriage Savers". McManus did not disclose this payment to his readers.

== See also ==
- Armstrong Williams
- Maggie Gallagher
- Bush administration payment of columnists
