= John McManus =

John McManus is the name of:

- John McManus (born 1985), Accountant
- John C. McManus (born 1965), American military historian and author
- J. P. McManus (born 1951), Irish businessman and racehorse owner
- John McManus (New Zealand politician) (1875–1950), New Zealand politician, trade unionist and farmer
- John McManus (author), American novelist
- John McManus (diplomat), former British Ambassador to Guinea
- John T. McManus (1904–1961), American journalist and progressive politician
- Red McManus (1925–2013), American college basketball coach
- Rove McManus (born 1974), Australian television identity
