= Mick McManus (footballer) =

Scottish footballer

Personal information
- Date of birth: 27 March 1954 (age 72)
- Place of birth: Glasgow, Scotland
- Position: Right winger

Senior career*
Years	Team	Apps	(Gls)
- Ashfield
1975–1977	Motherwell	3	(0)
1977–1981	Hamilton Academical	118	(19)
1981–1987	Montrose	157	(14)
- Newburgh
Total		278	(33)
- * Club domestic league appearances and goals

Mick McManus (born 27 March 1954) is a Scottish former professional footballer who played as a right winger.

== Career ==
Born in Glasgow, McManus made 278 appearances in the Scottish Football League for Motherwell, Hamilton Academical and Montrose. He also played for Ashfield and Newburgh.
