= List of piers =

Piers throughout the world include:

== Australia ==
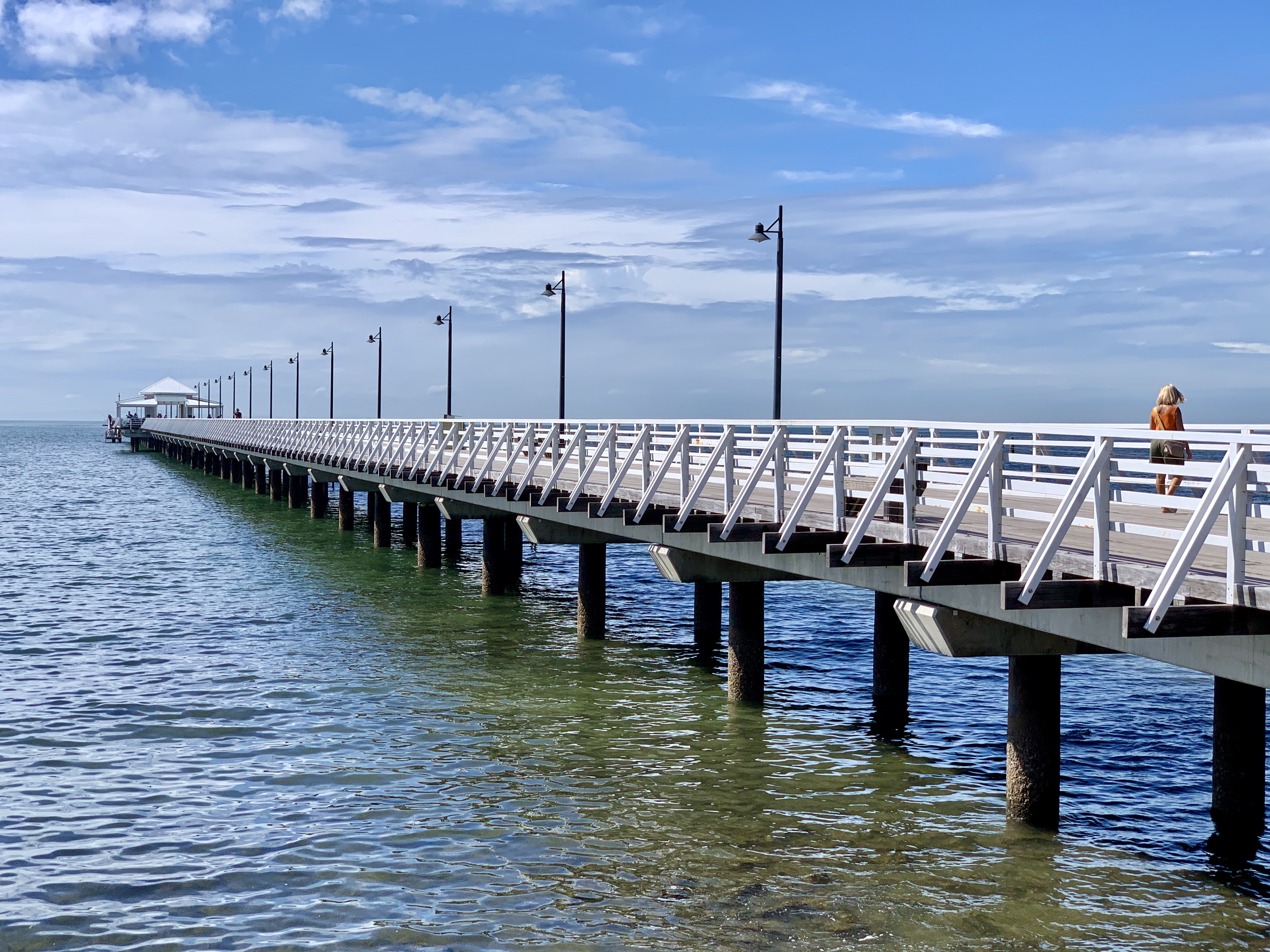
Shorncliffe Pier, 19km from the Brisbane CBD in Queensland

- Busselton Jetty, Busselton, Western Australia. The longest wooden pier in the southern hemisphere.
- Gem Pier, Williamstown, Victoria
- Coffs Harbour Jetty, New South Wales
- Pier 4/5, Walsh Bay, Sydney, New South Wales
- Southport Pier, Gold Coast, Queensland
- Shorncliffe pier, Shorncliffe, Queensland
- Station Pier, Port Melbourne, Victoria
- St Kilda Pier, St Kilda, Melbourne, Victoria
- Urangan Pier, Hervey Bay, Queensland

== Belgium ==
- Belgium Pier, Blankenberge
- Nieuwpoort Pier
- Ostend Pier

== Canada ==
- Pier 21, Halifax, Nova Scotia
- White Rock Pier, White Rock, British Columbia

== China ==
- Star Ferry Pier, Central, Hong Kong
- Edinburgh Place Ferry Pier, Hong Kong (now defunct)
- Star Ferry Pier, Tsim Sha Tsui, Hong Kong
- Tsing Yi Pier, Hong Kong
- Zhanqiao Pier, Qingdao

== Colombia ==
- Puerto Colombia, Atlántico

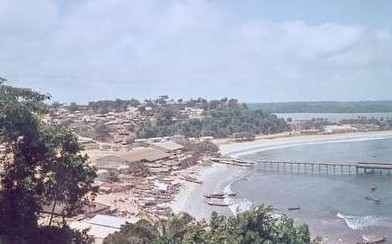
Sassandra pier, Côte d'Ivoire, Africa

== Côte d'Ivoire ==
- Sassandra, Western Côte d'Ivoire. The last surviving pier in West Africa

== Denmark ==
- Langelinie Pier

== Germany ==
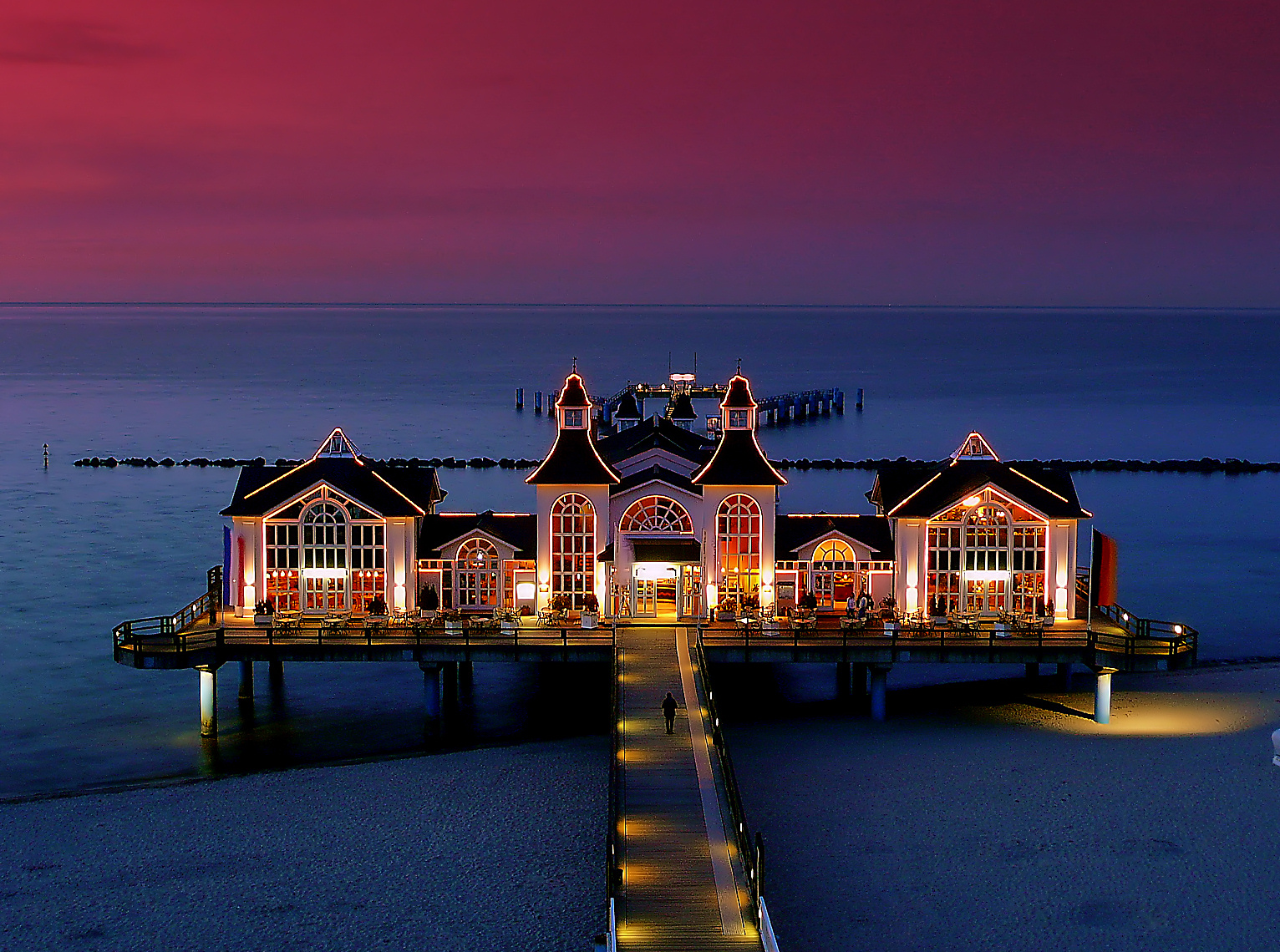
Illuminated Sellin Pier at dusk, Rügen island, Germany

- Göhren Pier
- Sellin Pier
- Heringsdorf Pier

== India ==
- Thalassery Pier
- Wellington Pier, Mumbai

== Japan ==
- Ōsanbashi Pier, Yokohama
- Piers of Yokohama

== Lithuania ==
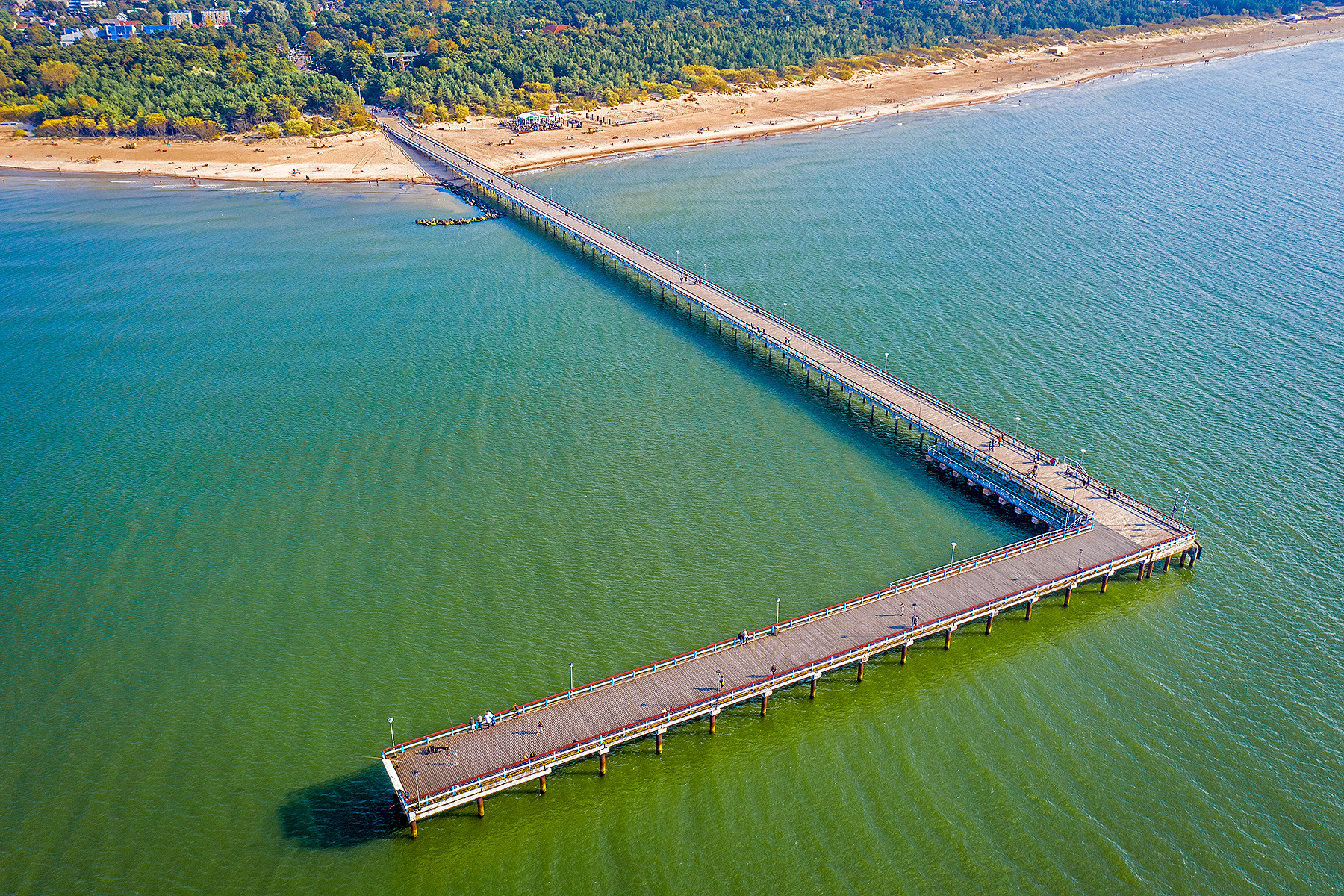
Palanga pier in the Baltic Sea

- Gelgaudiškis
- Palanga Pier

== Mexico ==
- Los Muertos Pier, Puerto Vallarta

== Netherlands ==
- Scheveningen
- Pier de Vries

== New Zealand ==
- New Brighton, Christchurch

== Poland ==
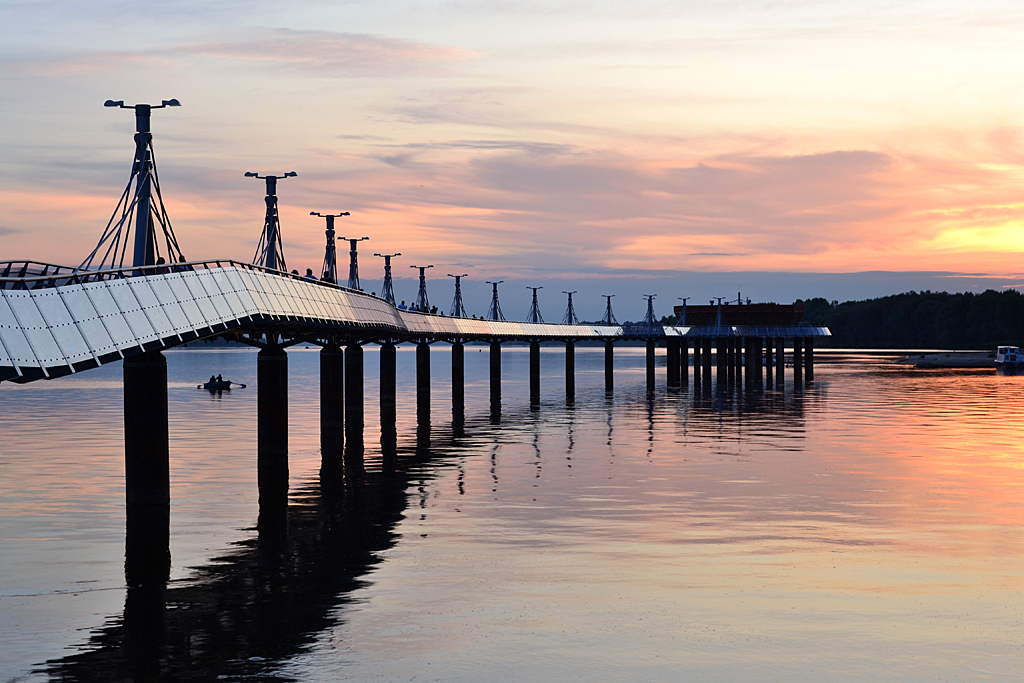
The pier in Płock at Vistula River in Poland

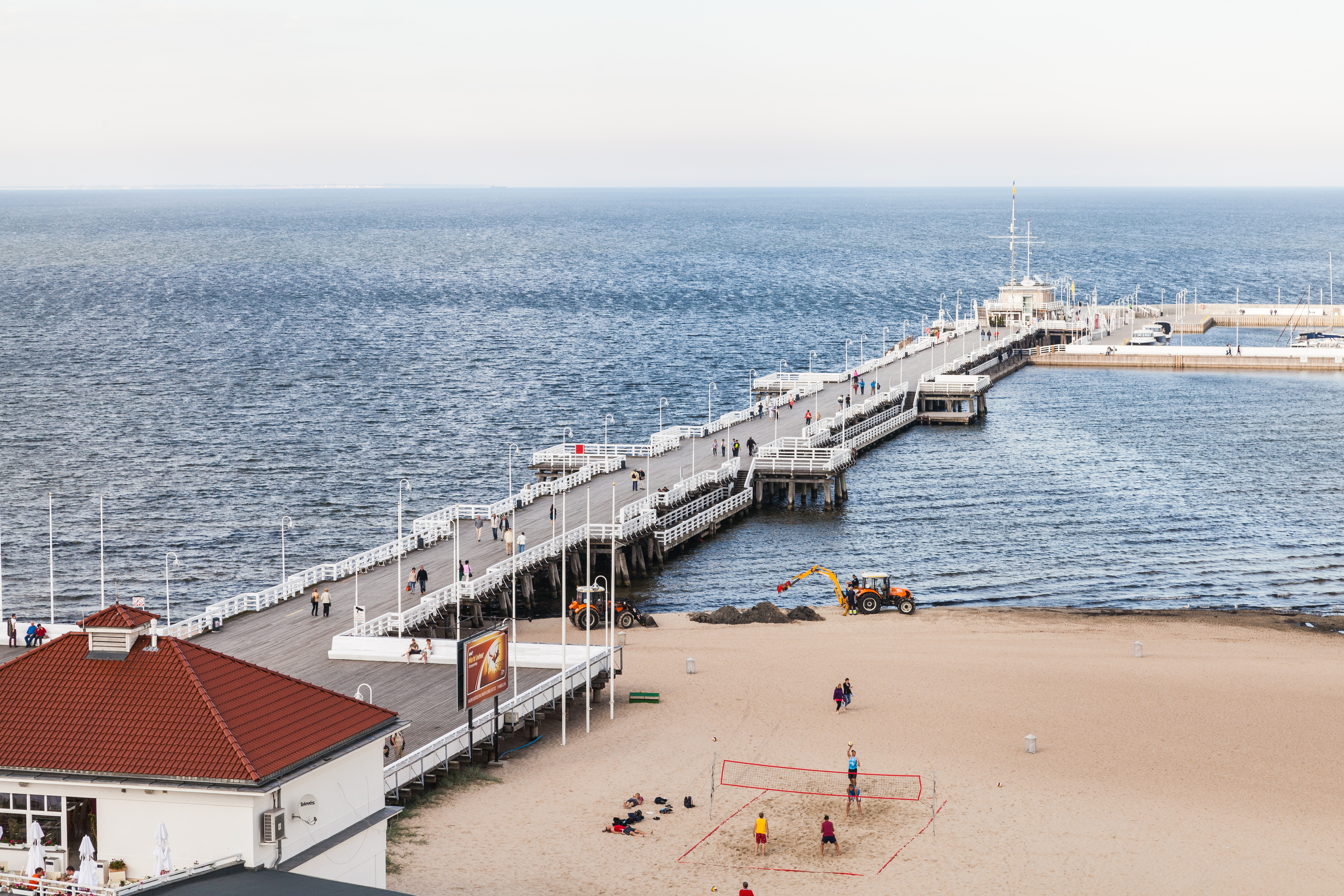
Sopot, Poland. The longest wooden pier in Europe - 450 metres from bank, 650 whole.

- Gdańsk Brzeźno
- Gdynia Orłowo Pier
- Jurata Pier (the part of the town of Jastarnia)
- Kołobrzeg Pier
- Międzyzdroje Pier
- Płock Pier
- Puck
- Sopot Pier - the longest wooden pier in Europe
- Miedwie

== Singapore ==
- Marina South Pier
- Clifford Pier, Marina Bay

== Sweden ==
- Malmö Pier

== Taiwan ==
- Glory Pier, Kaohsiung
- Ita Thao Pier, Nantou County
- Love Pier, Kaohsiung
- Shuishe Pier, Nantou County
- Shuitou Pier, Kinmen County
- Xuanguang Pier, Nantou County

== United Kingdom ==
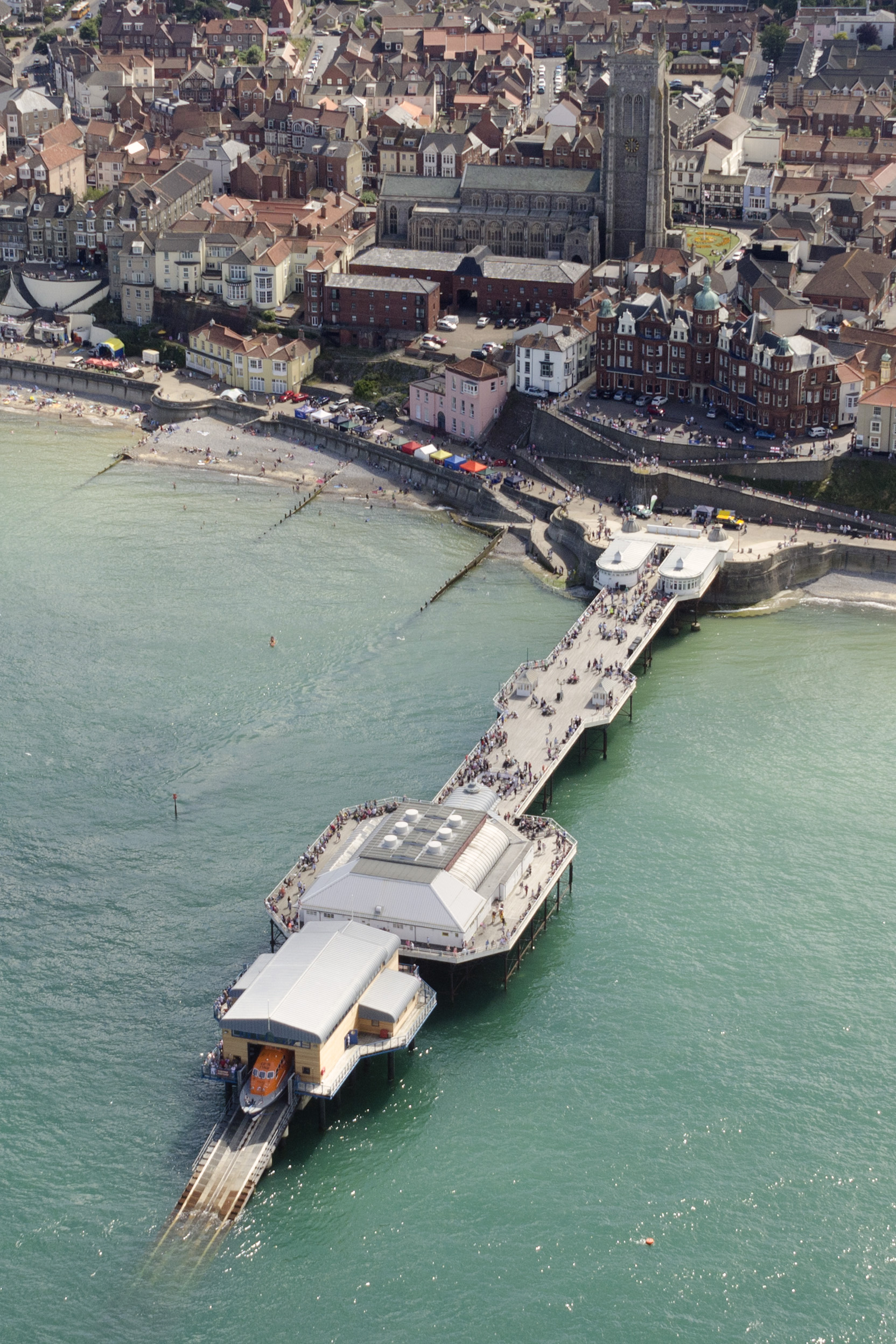
Cromer pier, England
