= Orłowo, Gdynia =

Orłowo
- District of Gdynia
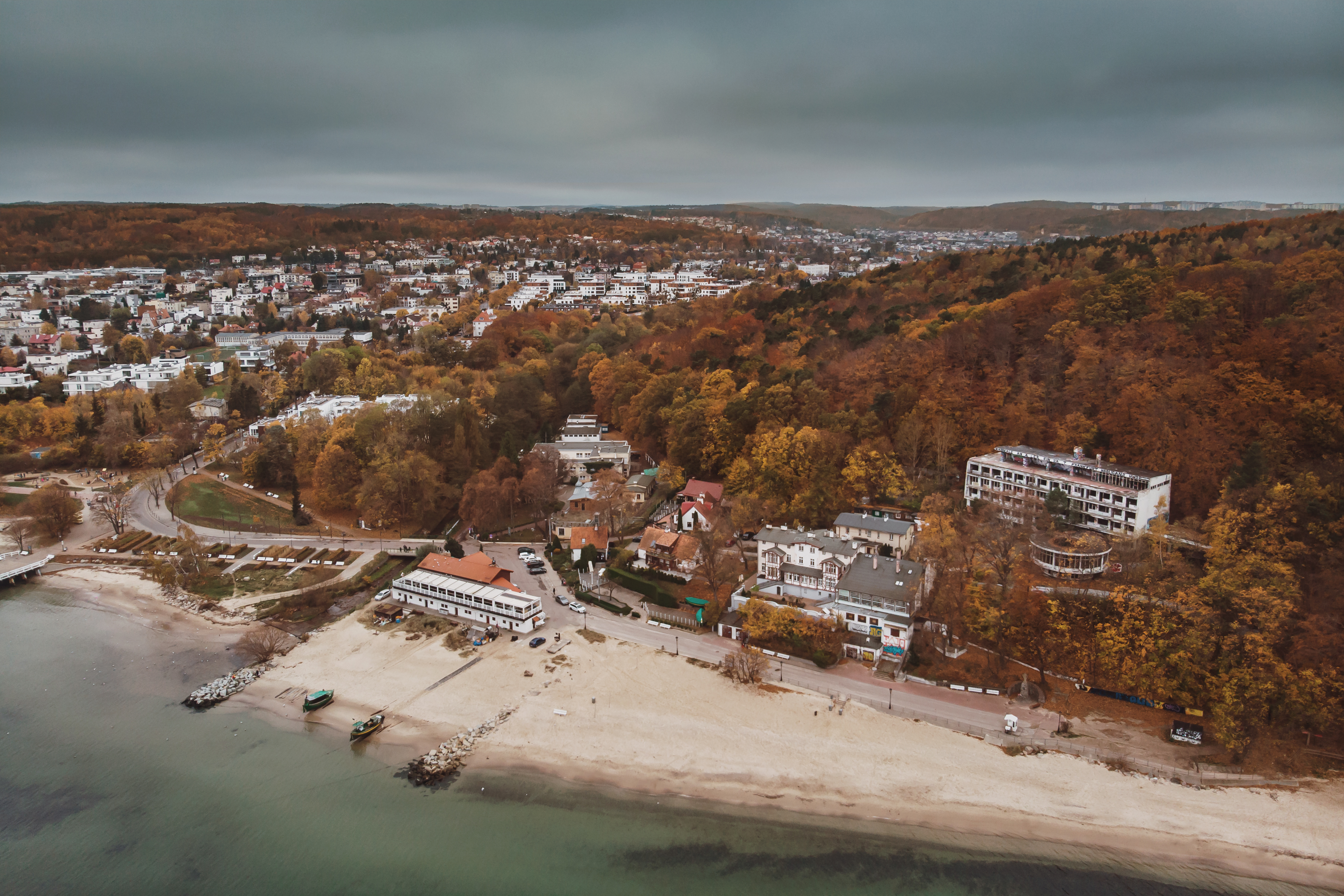
- Aerial view of Orłowo

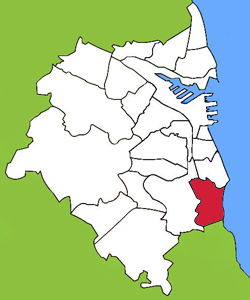
- Location of Orłowo within Gdynia
- Coordinates: 54°28′33″N 18°33′12″E
- Country: Poland
- Voivodeship: Pomeranian
- County/City: Gdynia
- Within city limits: 1935

Area
  - Total: 5.02 km^{2} (1.94 sq mi)

Population (2022)
  - Total: 6,789
  - Density: 1,350/km^{2} (3,500/sq mi)
- Time zone: UTC+1 (CET)
  - Summer (DST): UTC+2 (CEST)
- Vehicle registration: GA

Orłowo [ɔrˈwɔvɔ] is a coastal district of Gdynia, Poland, located in the southern part of the city.

Orłowo borders the districts of Redłowo and Mały Kack in the north and west, respectively, and the city of Sopot in the south.

Orłowo is best known for the environs of the Orłowo Cliff, pier and beach. Other notable sights include the Żeromski House, where writer Stefan Żeromski lived and worked in 1920, the Kolibki manor and park, a former possession of King John III Sobieski, various historic villas, and a memorial to the Polish 2nd Marine Rifle Regiment, which fought in the area against the German invasion of Poland in 1939. There is also the Kolibki observation tower.

== History ==
Historical population
Year	Pop.
1921	38
2022	6,789

During the German occupation of Poland in World War II, on October 12, 1939, Orłowo was the first district of Gdynia, whose Polish inhabitants were expelled from the city to be replaced by German colonists as part of the Lebensraum policy. Some 4,000 Poles, including 1,300 children, were expelled. In 1941–1942, the Germans operated a small subcamp of the Stutthof concentration camp in the district.

== Transport ==
The Gdynia Orłowo railway station is located in Orłowo.
