= Leo Van Paemel =

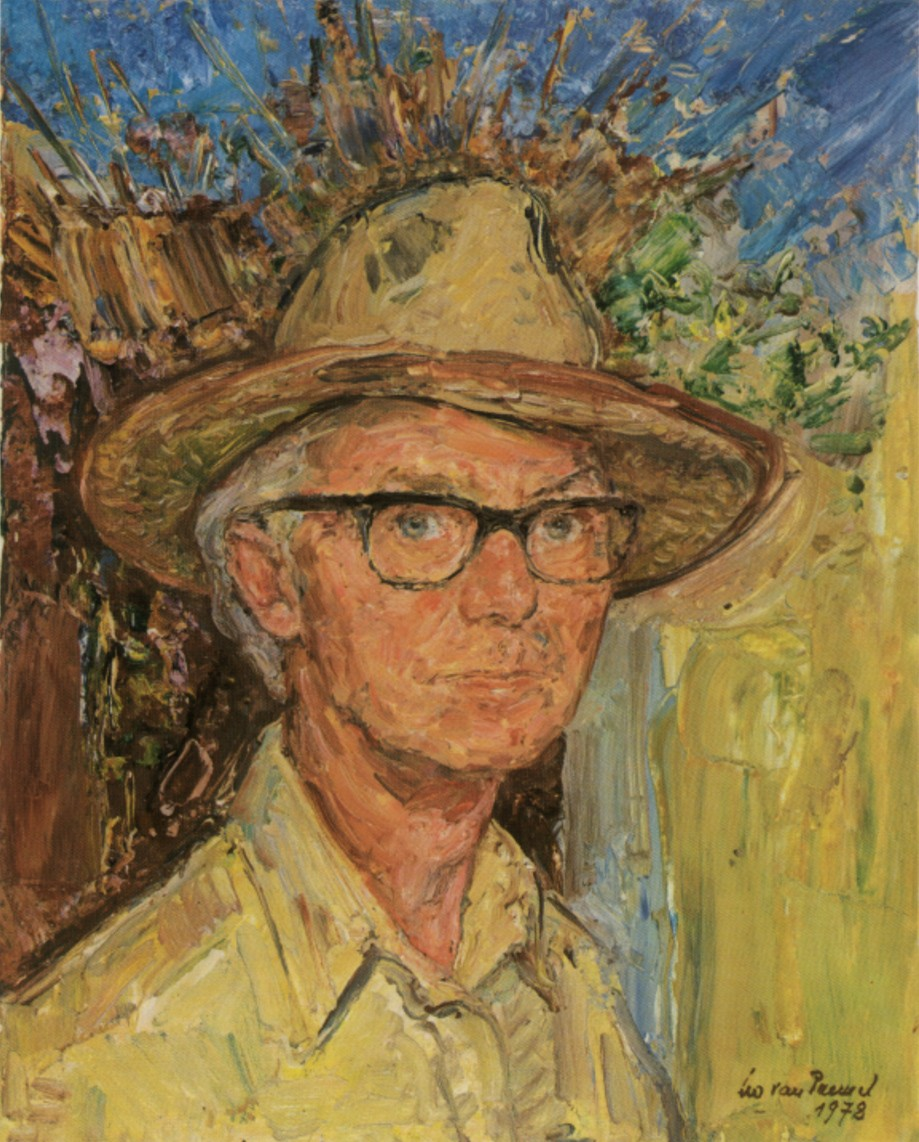
- Leo Van Paemel: self-portrait painted in Provence (1978).
- Born: 15 January 1914; Blankenberge, Belgium
- Died: 28 January 1995 (aged 81); Bruges, Belgium
- Occupation: Artist

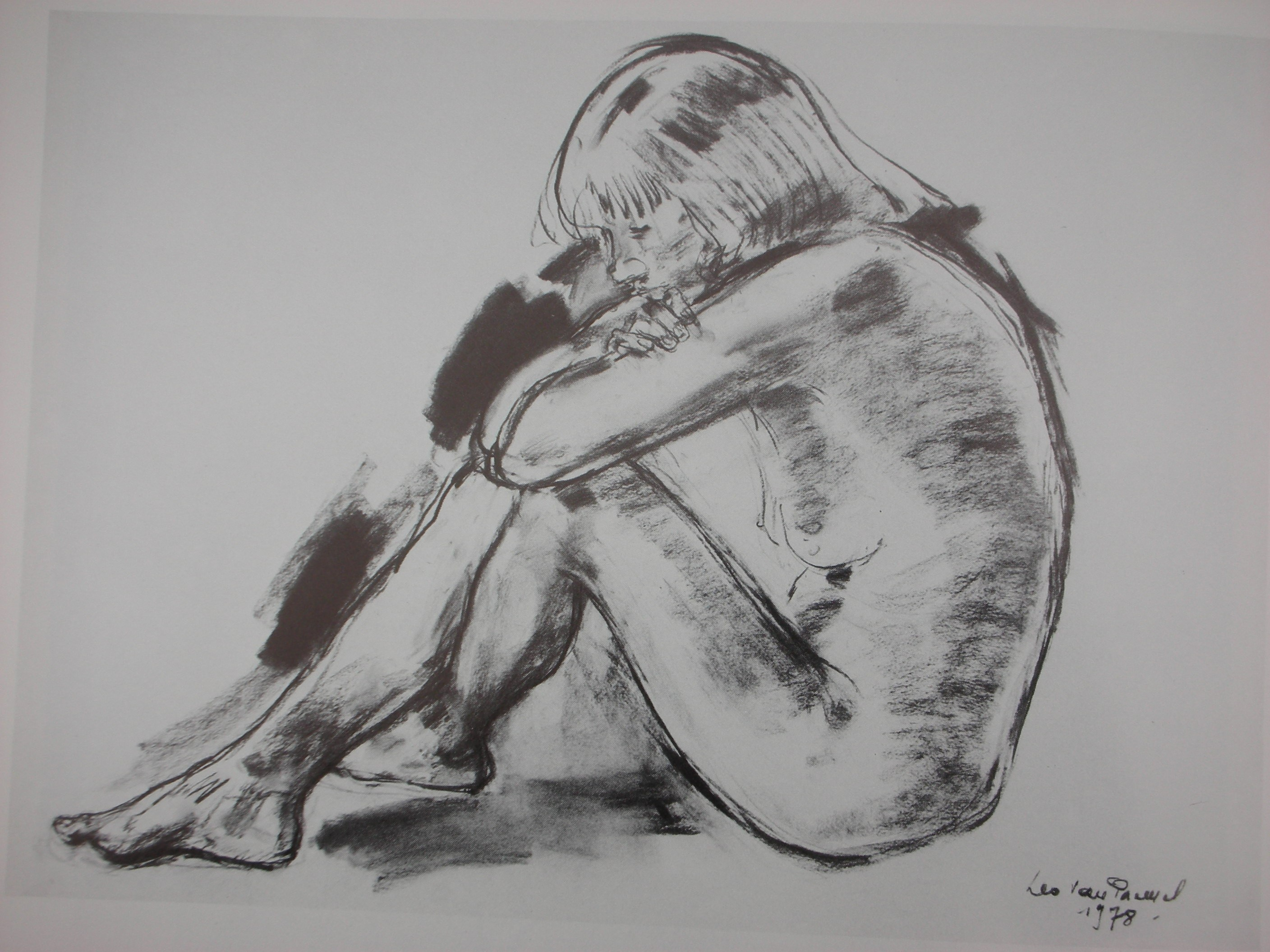
Charcoal drawing (1978)

Leo Joris Van Paemel (born Blankenberge 15 January 1914: died Bruges, 28 January 1995) was a Flemish artist.

== Life ==
=== Early years ===
Leo van Paemel and his twin brother, Willy, were born in Blankenberge. Leo himself said that he had always painted for as long as he could remember. Paintings survive from 1927, produced by van Paemel in Lissewege, Uitkerke and the former fishing port of Blankenberge. At that time he was just 13 years old and a student at the State Middle School ("RMS") in Blankenberge where his artistic talent was identified and encouraged, earning him privileges including the right to have his paintings used to decorated the walls of the school's covered play area.

Leo's uncle was the artist (who later concentrated on engraving for which today he is better remembered) Jules Van Paemel, who did much to support the nephew's talent. Leo regularly accompanied his uncle across the polders around Uitkerke, Lissewege, Zuienkerke and Dudzele, and it was on these expeditions that Leo received his first lessons in painting.

Between 1929 and 1934 van Paemel studied in Antwerp at the Fine Arts Academy where he won a succession of prizes, gaining a place as a student at the institution's upper school where he remained till 1940, becoming a star pupil of the influential artist Isidore Opsomer. His contemporaries included Jan Cox, Jack Godderis, René De Coninck, Mark Macken, Mark Mendelson and, from Bruges in his own region, Luc Peire and Luc De Jaegher. Leo van Paemel nevertheless was an artist who followed his own path rather than becoming a member of some wider artistic trend or grouping.

=== Middle and later years ===
From 1942 till 1946 van Paemel had his own studio in Brussels, but in 1946 he returned to Blankenberge. From the 1960s he was able to make art his profession. In 1968 he relocated to nearby Bruges where his studio was centrally located close to the city's famous Bell Tower. It was in Bruges that he died, but he is buried in Blankenberge.

== Works ==
Leo van Paemel's personal mission was to provide an interpretation of the North Sea and everything associated with it: the beach life, the sea-front atmosphere, the communal bustle of the little fishing ports and yacht harbours, the coastal polders. He also painted in Normandy, Brittany, both in France, in Lancashire, England, and in the Netherlands. He developed a specialism in portraiture. He succeeded in giving a modern interpretation to a classical genre applying the techniques of the old masters.
