= 1919 Blankenberge police station bombing =

1919 crime in Belgium

1919 Blankenberge Police Station Bombing
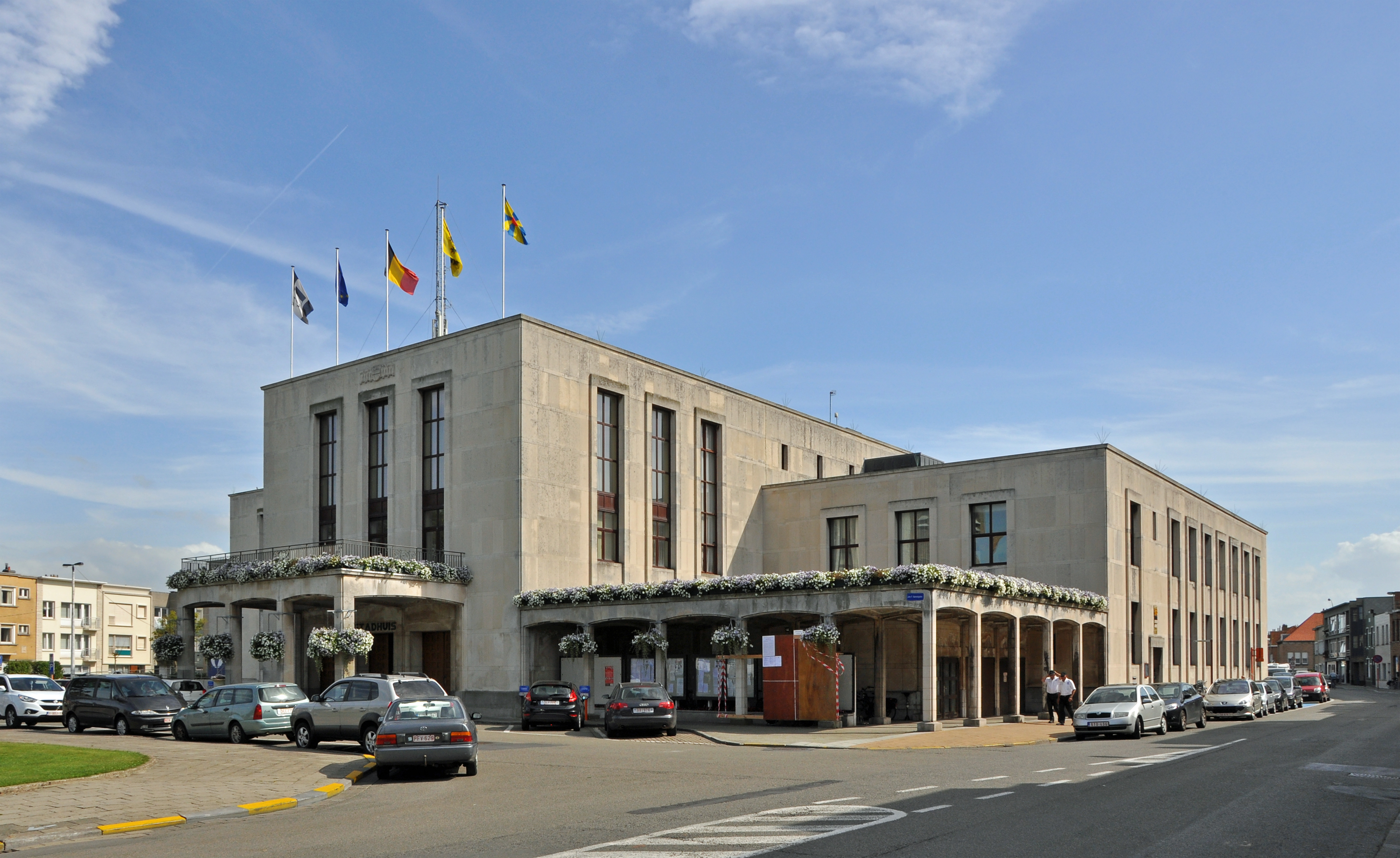
- Site of the Blankenberge Police Station, now city hall with the modern police station located at its right side
- Location: Blankenberge, West Flanders, Belgium
- Date: 7 May 1919; Night
- Attack type: Bombing
- Weapon: Improvised bomb package
- Deaths: 2
- Injuries: 2
- Perpetrator: Unknown
- Motive: Revenge action in the aftermath of the First World War

In the aftermath of the First World War, Belgium and its people started to repair its war damage and mourn their losses. However, before they could move on, a number of revenge actions shocked the country. Most of these crimes went unpunished as the perpetrators could easily get away in the chaos that gripped Belgium because the country was still trying to restore order. The attack on the Blankenberge police station however was one of the worst of these attacks and is still commemorated to this day in the city, mainly because the 1919 Blankenberge police force only consisted of police commissioner A. Naessens and five other officers.

== Attack ==
On the night of 7 May 1919, several police officers had finished their night patrol and were returning to the police station. When they arrived at the station, two officers found a linen-wrapped sack near the doorstep. Not being suspicious of it, the officers took the package in to see what was inside. Officer Cornelis Ponjaert opened the sack and found a bike chain as well as a metal box which was wrapped with thin ropes. When Ponjaert unwound the ropes a big explosion suddenly occurred, immediately followed by another even bigger explosion. Everything in the waiting room was broken and thrown about and the remaining officers were thrown to the ground.

Officer Ponjaert, aged 56 (who opened the package), was fatally injured and died a half hour later. Two other officers were seriously injured as well; one of them died of his injuries in the hospital and another officer was left slightly injured. Only one officer and the commissioner were left unharmed.

=== Victims ===
Name	City of Origin	Fate
Cornelis Ponjaert	Blankenberge	Killed
Gerard De Wulf	Blankenberge	Killed
Octaaf Steuperaert	Uitkerke	Seriously Injured
Leopold Massenhove		Slightly Injured

== Aftermath ==
The attack was published in many news papers including Het Brugsch Handelsblad and caused an uproar in the city. An immediate search for those responsible was held and two brothers were arrested and placed under suspicion of the crime. But they were released when the police concluded there was not enough evidence to warrant a conviction. No further arrests or suspects were found. It was later concluded that this tragic act of terrorism was most likely a revenge act targeted against the police.

The two victims of the tragedy are buried alongside each other in the graveyard of Blankenberge at the Ereperk der plicht where everybody who was killed while acting out their duty are buried.
