= Sellin =

- Municipality
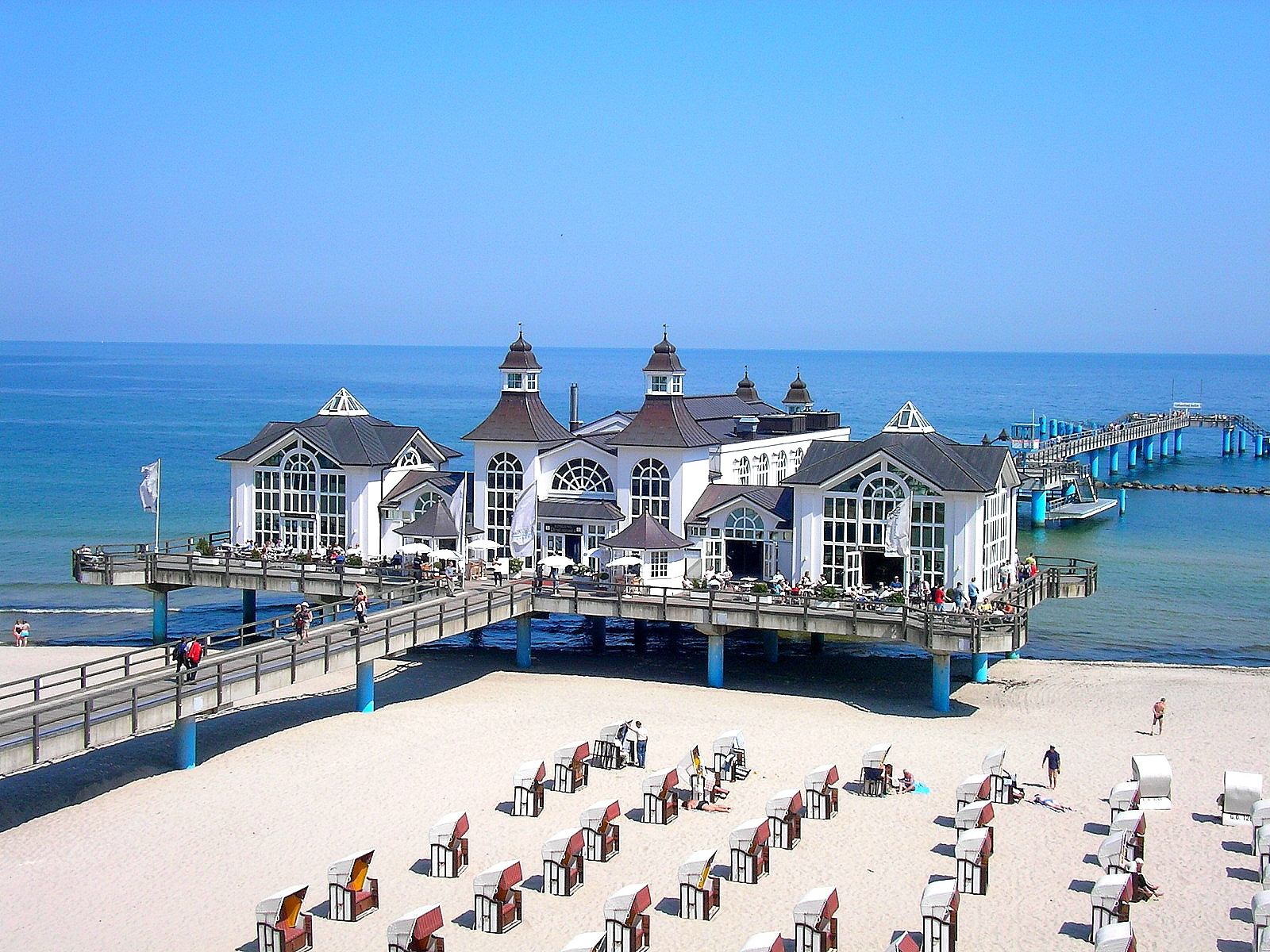
- Sellin Pier

- Coat of arms

- Location of Sellin within Vorpommern-Rügen district
- Interactive map of Sellin
- Location within Germany Location within Mecklenburg-Vorpommern
- Coordinates: 54°23′N 13°41.5′E
- Country: Germany
- State: Mecklenburg-Vorpommern
- District: Vorpommern-Rügen
- Municipal assoc.: Mönchgut-Granitz

Government
  - Mayor: Reinhard Liedtke

Area
  - Total: 14.33 km^{2} (5.53 sq mi)
- Elevation: 30 m (98 ft)

Population (2025-12-31)
  - Total: 2,465
  - Density: 172.0/km^{2} (445.5/sq mi)
- Time zone: UTC+01:00 (CET)
  - Summer (DST): UTC+02:00 (CEST)
- Postal codes: 18586
- Dialling codes: 038303
- Vehicle registration: RÜG
- Website: www.sellin.de

Sellin is a municipality on the Island of Rügen, in Mecklenburg-Vorpommern, Germany.

== History ==
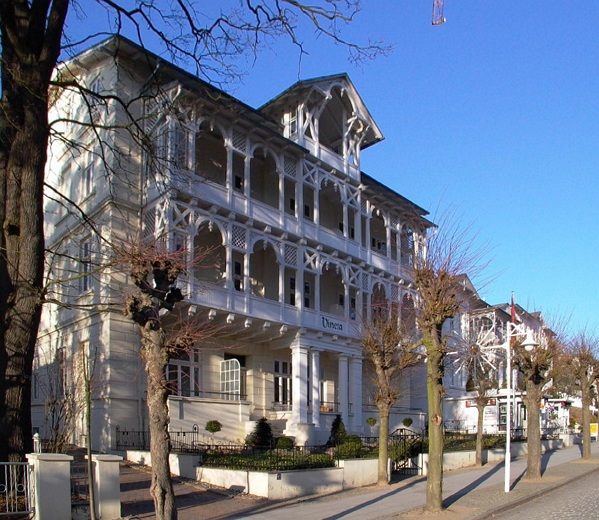
Villa Vineta (1902), Wilhelmstraße - typical resort architecture of German Baltic Sea spas

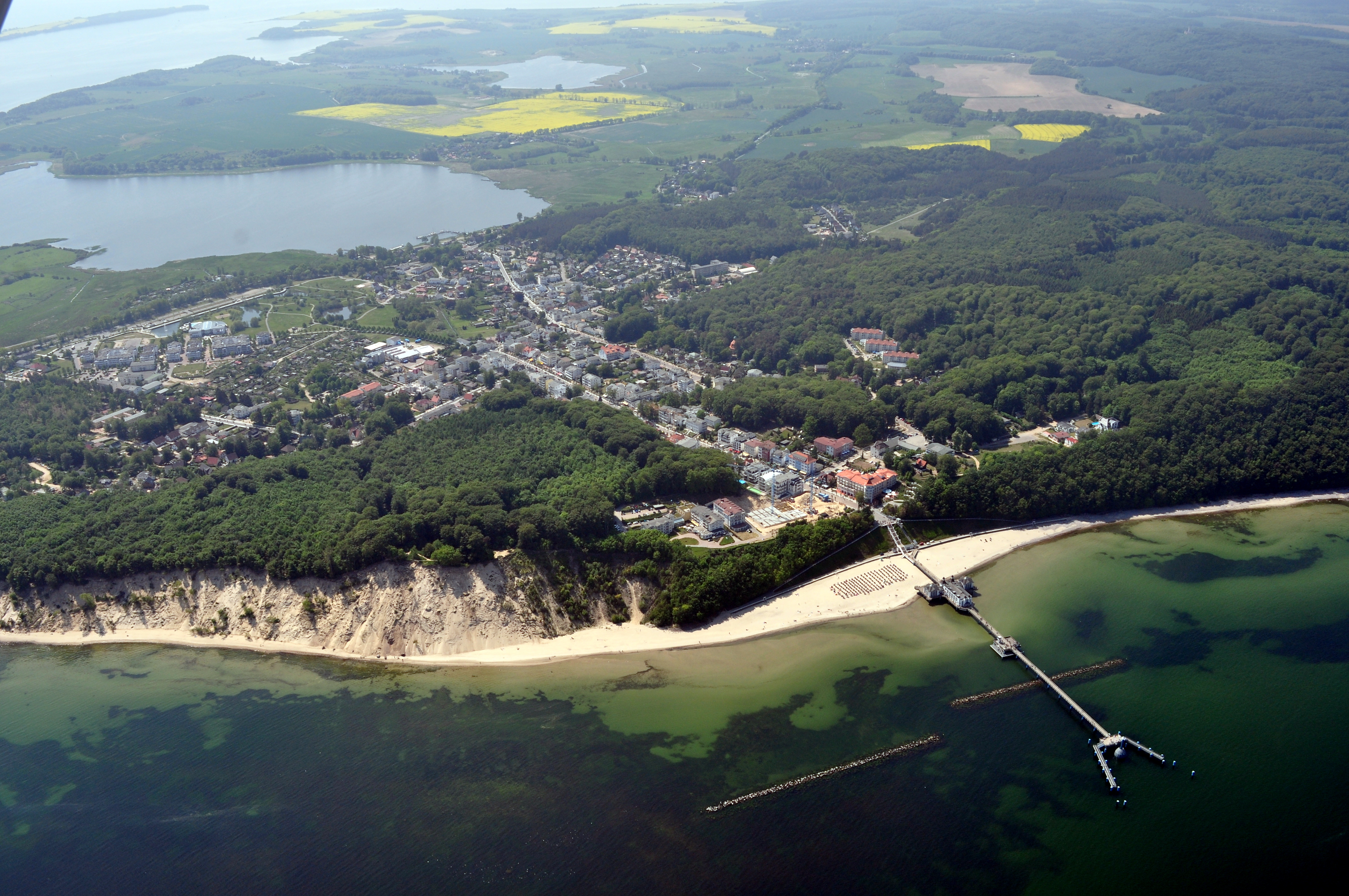
Spa town of Sellin from the air - with the Sellin Pier stretching into the Baltic Sea

First mentions of Sellin date to 1295. From 1880 on, the town gained importance as a Baltic Sea spa town. After the Wende in 1989, the building stock in the village was extensively renovated. In 1992, Sellin Pier was rebuilt and was officially opened on 2 April 1998.

== Culture and sights ==
Wilhelmstraße, with its houses from the resort architecture period (turn of the 19th and 20th century), runs up to the steep coast, up to 30 metres high - where there is a steep flight of steps or a lift to Sellin Pier or the promenade on the South Beach (Südstrand).

Sellin has the longest pier on Rügen: 394 metres. Since 1991 the historic centre has been thoroughly renovated as part of a programme of urban development.

Other sights are the Galerie Hartwich in the old fire station (Feuerwehrhaus), the Amber Museum with its associated workshop and the Gnadenkirche. The Sellin Amber Museum was founded in 1999 and is the only one on Rügen.

The lake of Schwarzer See in the Granitz also belongs to the municipality and has been designated a strict nature reserve.

== Personalities ==
- Sophie Taeuber-Arp (1889-1943), the Swiss painter was in 1923 vacation guest
- Albert Einstein (1879-1955), physicist and Nobel Prize winner in 1921, was guest in the summer of 1915
