= Blankenberge =

Blankenberge Blanknberge (West Flemish): Blankenberghe (French)
- City and municipality
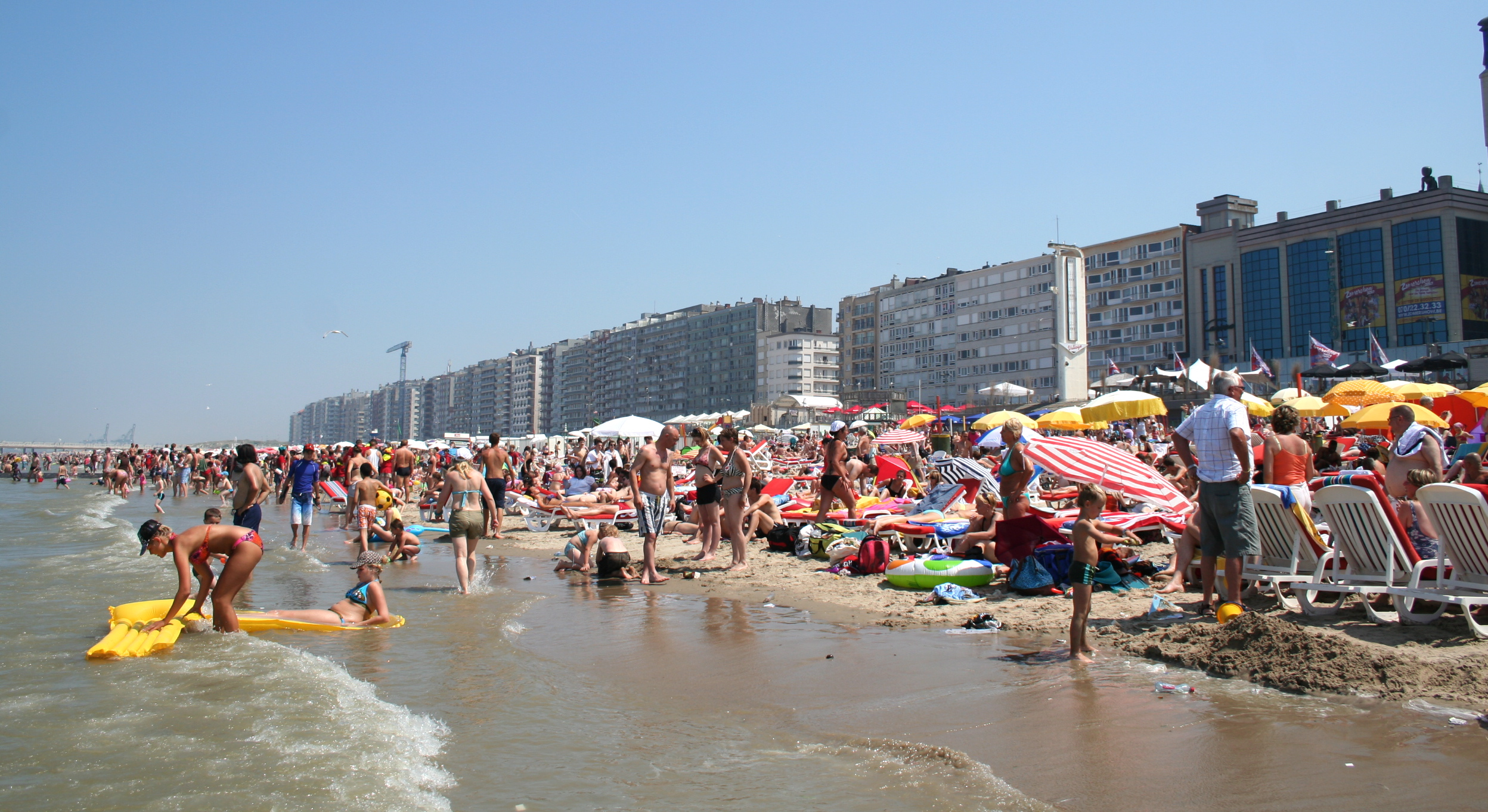
- Blankenberge beach on a hot summer day

- Flag Coat of arms

- Location of Blankenberge in West Flanders
- Interactive map of Blankenberge
- Location in Belgium
- Coordinates: 51°18′N 03°07′E
- Country: Belgium
- Community: Flemish Community
- Region: Flemish Region
- Province: West Flanders
- Arrondissement: Bruges

Government
  - Mayor: Björn Prasse (Team Blankenberge)
  - Governing parties: Team Blankenberge, N-VA, Vooruit! & CD&V

Area
  - Total: 19.02 km^{2} (7.34 sq mi)

Population (2018-01-01)
  - Total: 20,349
  - Density: 1,070/km^{2} (2,771/sq mi)
- Postal codes: 8370
- NIS code: 31004
- Area codes: 050
- Website: www.blankenberge.be

Blankenberge (Dutch: [ˈblɑŋkə(m)bɛrɣə]; French: [blɑ̃kønbɛʁg]; West Flemish: Blanknberge [ˈblɑŋʔŋ̍bærɦə]) is a seaside municipality and city in the Belgian province of West Flanders. The municipality comprises the town of Blankenberge proper and the settlement of Uitkerke.

On 1 December 2014, Blankenberge had a total population of 19,897. The total area of the municipality is 17.41 km^{2}, giving a population density of 1,142 inhabitants per km^{2}. The towns inhabitants are called Blankenbergenaars.

Blankenberge is one of the most important seaside resorts on the Belgian coast in terms of tourist numbers and hotel reservations. It is a national and to a certain extent international seaside resort, attracting visitors from across northern Europe. It possesses a long sandy beach, and a 350-metre-long (1,150 ft) Art Deco pier, the Belgium Pier, constructed in 1933.

== The fishery ==
The first fishing activities date back to the 11th century. By the 12th century, the fishing fleet had more than 60 ships. A pontoon was built in the 15th century in the vicinity of the lighthouse, a construction which served until the beginning of the 16th century. The fishermen of Blankenberge would land their catch in barges which approached the beach. No port was constructed until 1871 when a navigation channel with a wharf was built. The fishery declined during the period between the two world wars and disappeared in 1945. The port was destroyed by the Germans in World War 2. A new port for pleasure boats was rebuilt in 1955. The port has undergone two more extensions and currently accommodates 1,000 boats.

== Seaside resort ==
As early as the first half of the 18th century, tourists came to Blankenberghe (spelling influenced by French). The Brugsesteenweg was built in 1723. This not only ensured a growing export of fish but also an easy connection for the inhabitants of Bruges who came to the sea for a day of relaxation. There was no such thing as sea bathing at that time. Bathing developed under the influence of English tourism in the 19th century. The first bathing cabins appeared on the beach in 1838. Shortly afterwards, a wooden seawall was built and the first hotels appeared. In 1859 the impressive Casino Kursaal was built.

On 16 August 1863, the Heist-Bruges railway opened, with a stop in Blankenberge. This made Blankenberge much more accessible for (wealthier) tourists, who previously could only reach Blankenberge by carriages along cobblestone roads or by boats (see tourist information in 1905 travel guide Pages 210 and 211 and Blad 212).

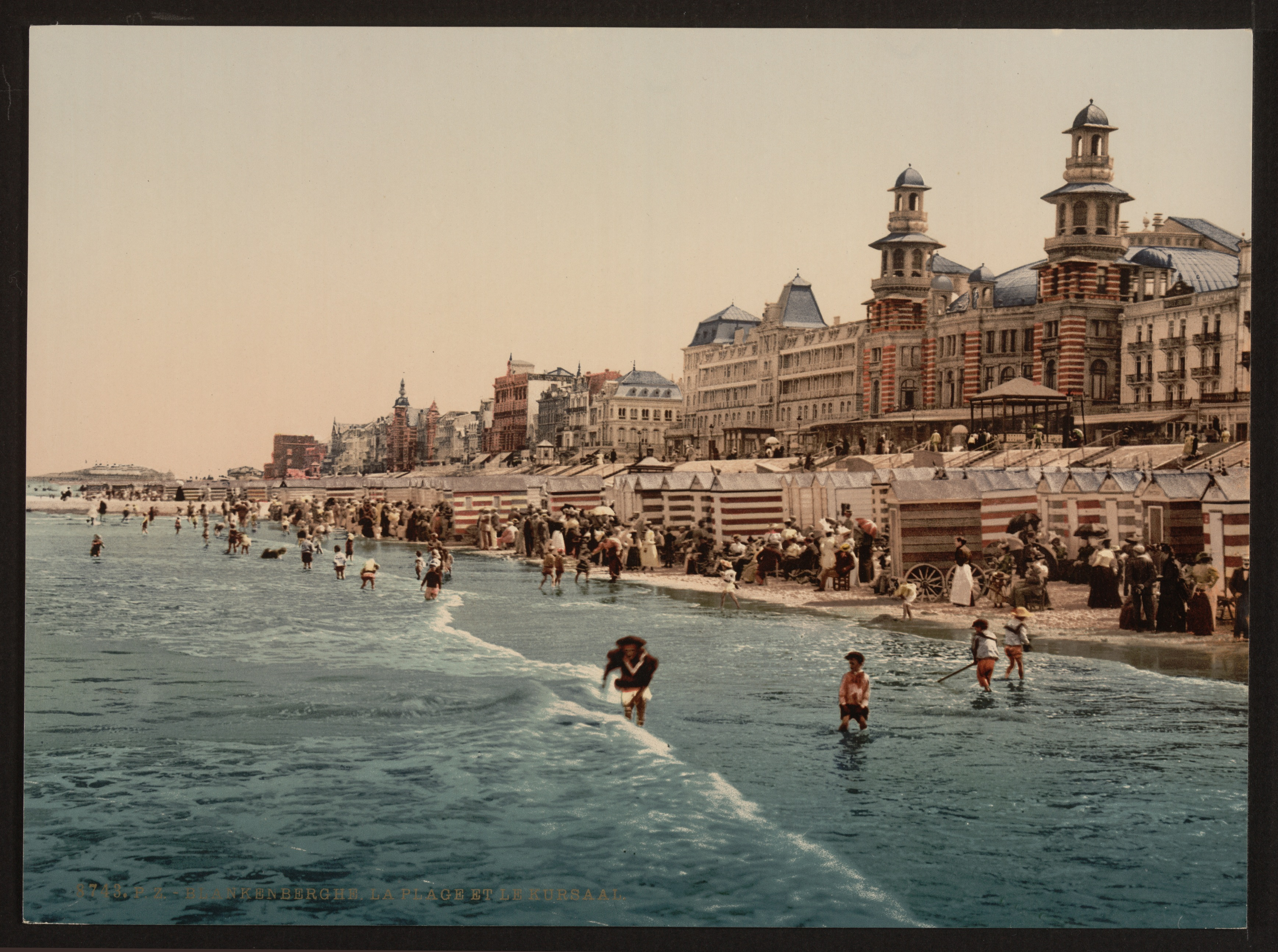
The beach, bathing machines and Kursaal c 1900s. Photochrome

By the end of the 19th century, the seawall was filled with luxury hotels and holiday villas. A cast-iron pier (1893–1894) was also constructed, the first 350-metre structure out to sea on the European mainland. During the Belle Époque, the fashionable Blankenberge was the favorite holiday destination of the Belgian beau monde; only the crowned heads, the nobility, prominent politicians, artists and the rich bourgeoisie could afford to spend their summer holidays in their second residence by the sea. Archduke Franz Ferdinand, heir to the throne of the Habsburg Empire, for example, regularly visited. Growing tourism provided employment and prosperity for the city. The population grew strongly. The cast iron pier was replaced by a concrete pier in 1933 and the old casino was replaced by a new Art Deco casino (1932–1934). The villas and hotels along the seawall were almost completely destroyed during the Second World War. In the reconstruction, quality and solidity were more important than aesthetics. In the mid-1950s, elite hotels such as the Hôtel des Bains et des Familles made way for cheaper, less luxurious apartment buildings and popular campsites. The tourists soon found their way back to Blankenberge, but the public had changed. With the increasing prosperity in the 1960s and 1970s, mass tourism also made its appearance in Blankenberge and from then on it mainly attracted the working and middle class from the Belgian interior. The population continues to swell in the summer months. The infrastructure to accommodate these tourists is still expanding.

== World War II ==
Blankenberge, formed part of the Atlantic Wall defences constructed by the German occupiers. Part of the pre war coastal tourist development were demolished to accommodate this.

Allied bombings took place, including on the Zeedijk and the Grote Markt.

Blankenberge was liberated on 9 September 1944 by the Manitoba Dragoons led by Eric James. Every year this event is commemorated on the following Saturday afternoon with a ceremony and a performance by a concert band on Manitobaplein.

== Railways ==
Blankenberge railway station was opened in 1863. Trains operated by NMBS run towards Brussels, and the Kusttram run by De Lijn runs along the Belgian coast of the North Sea.

== Cultural history ==
Before the First World War, Blankenberge was an exclusive holiday resort frequently attended by Royalty. Archduke Franz Ferdinand of Austria and his wife Sophie, Duchess of Hohenberg as well as his sister Archduchess Elisabeth Amalie of Austria and her husband Prince Aloys of Liechtenstein and his niece Archduchess Marie Valerie of Austria were regular holiday makers in Blankenberge. They stayed in a special wing of the Grand Hotel des Bains et des Families. The Archduke enjoyed his walks to Wenduine and attended service daily at the St Rochus church. The Archduke and his wife were planning to travel again to Blankenberge after their last official engagement before the summer holiday at Sarajevo in 1914 where they were killed.

Blankenberg (so spelt) also figures in Phineas Finn by Anthony Trollope as the scene of a duel between Finn and another character, Lord Chiltern.

The tenor Enrico Caruso attended Blankenberge for a performance in 1910.

After the First World War the Blankenberge police station was bombed by an unknown perpetrator. The blast killed 2 officers and wounded 2 others.

After World War II it was a regular holiday destination. Notable musical institutions were the "Eden" where popular Flemish artists performed on the board walk. The city hosted "Spécial les vacancies" in 1979 under the mayorship of Willem Content. International artist such as Joe Dassin, Boney M, Plastic Bertrand and Dalida attended this event. Later the Flemisch Private TV broadcaster VTM organised "Tien om te Zien" with musical performances of Flemish artists. Today the Flemish public radio organises yearly the "Radio 2 Zomerhit".

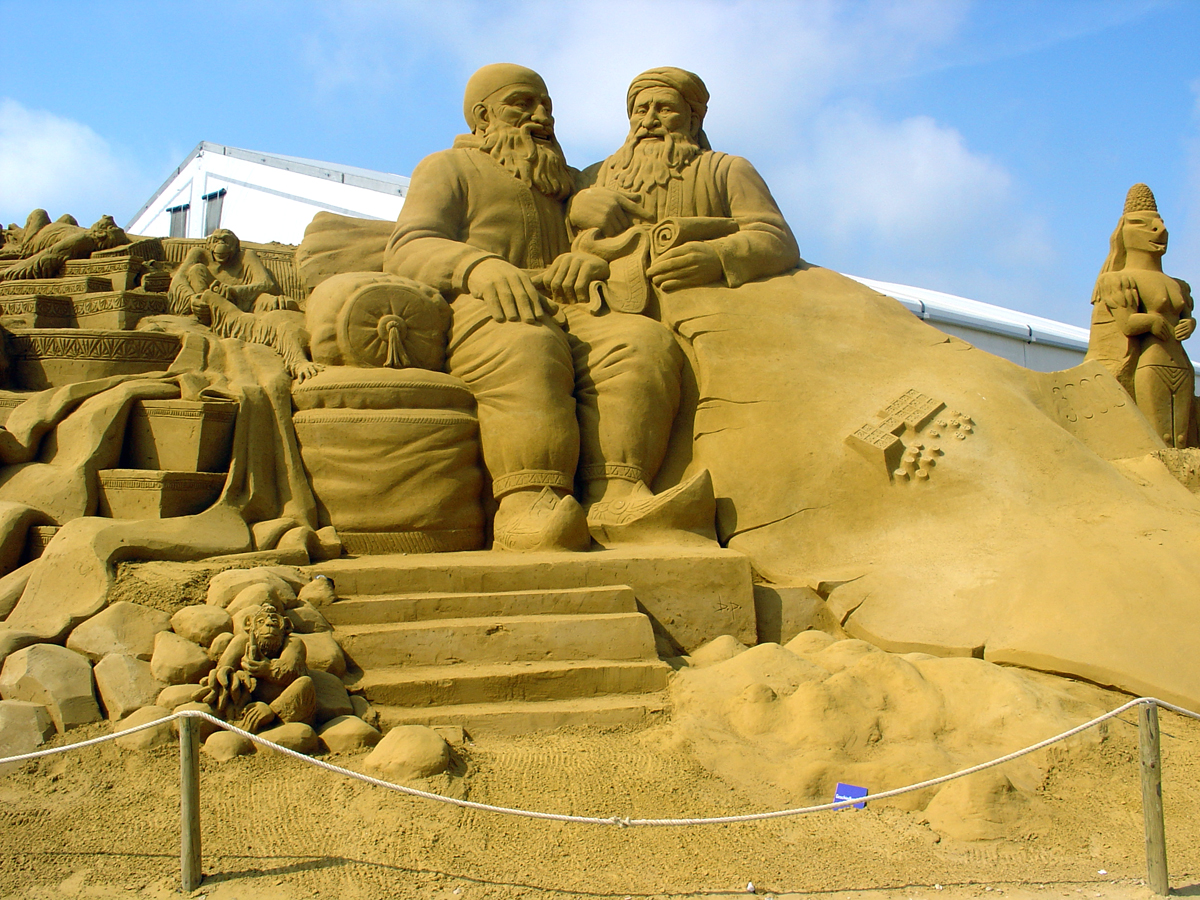
Sand sculptures on the beach at Blankenberge, 2006

The films Franz (1971) by Jacques Brel with Barbara, Isabelle and Lust (1975) with Anicée Alvina, Rimbaud Verlaine (Total Eclipse) (1995) with Leonardo DiCaprio and Le Tout Nouveau Testament (2015) with Catherine Deneuve, Benoît Poelvoorde and François Damiens were notably filmed in the city (or at least in part).

The World's Largest Sand Sculpture Festival, featuring giant sand sculptures (Zandsculptuur) took place on the beach in June until 2012.

== Nature and landscape ==
Blankenberge is located on the Belgian North Sea coast. There is a wide beach with a seawall and promenade. The town is below the sea wall so that one ascends steps to reach the sea from the town. East of Blankenberge are the Zeebos and De Fonteintjes nature reserves. To the south is the Uitkerkse Polder nature reserve.

== Notable festive events ==
- Carnival Parade
- Two-Days Walk event, every first weekend of May
- Klankenberge
- Flower Parade (Bloemencorso), every last Sunday of August
- Bel'Lumière

== Notable inhabitants ==
- Wing Commander Roy George Claringbould Arnold MiD RAF 29198 is buried in the CWG Cemetery Row A Grave 18. On 9 June 1941 Arnold saved the lives of his five-man Wellington crew from IX Squadron (including Flt Lt Dominic Bruce OBE MC AFM KSG MA the 'Medium Sized Man' of Colditz fame) by calmly staying at the controls of the burning plane to hold it steady while they bailed out, in the certain knowledge that he would die doing so.
- Pieter Aspe, Belgian writer (1953–2021). Author of a series of detective stories starring inspector Pieter Van In.
- Jean de Coninck, resistance fighter; like five other young Belgians from Blankenberghe (Georges Sandelé, René Mestdagh, Camille De Corte, Raymond Marmenout, Louis Dehenauw), were sentenced to death by the German court-martial sitting in Faouët (Brittany). On 24 June 1944 they were shot at Rosquéo, in Lanvénégen. Jean de Coninck was only wounded and he fled under fire. He was cared for and hidden by locals and survived.
- Adolf Eugen Fick, physician and physiologist, died in Blankenberge in 1901.
- Anna Kéthly, Leader of the Social Democratic Party of Hungary during the Hungarian Revolution of 1956, the second female MP of the National Assembly (Hungary)
- René Lagrou (1904–1969), a Belgian politician and collaborator with Nazi Germany. He was the first leader of the Algemeene-SS Vlaanderen during World War II.
- Frans Masereel, Flemish painter and woodcutter born here in 1889.
- Leo Van Paemel, artist born (and later buried) in Blankenberge.
- Rudi Pillen, Belgian contemporary painter.
- Brian Vandenbussche, Belgian goalkeeper.
- Roger Wittevrongel (1933-), Belgian painter, draftsman and graphic designer, representative of hyperrealism.

== Schools ==
Blankenberge has schools from both school networks in Belgium. The two secondary schools are:

- Sint-Jozef – Sint-Pieter Blankenberge (formerly known as Sint-Pieterscollege – Sint-Jozefshandelsschool, subsidized free school)
- Maerlant-Middenschool • Maerlant Atheneum (GO! Onderwijs van de Vlaamse gemeenschap)

Both schools have a number of different elementary schools organized around them.

== Gallery ==
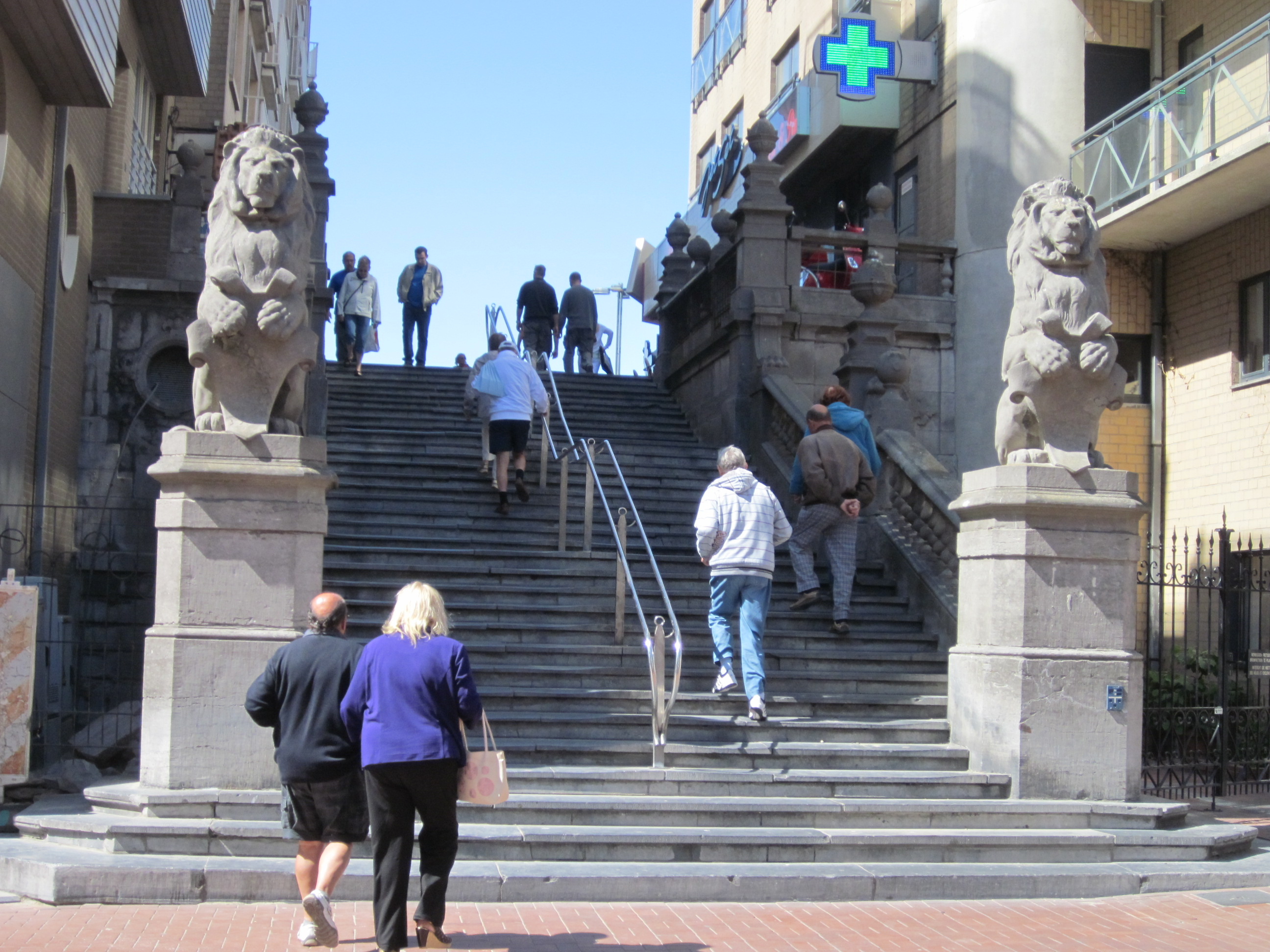
One of the stairs up to the beach

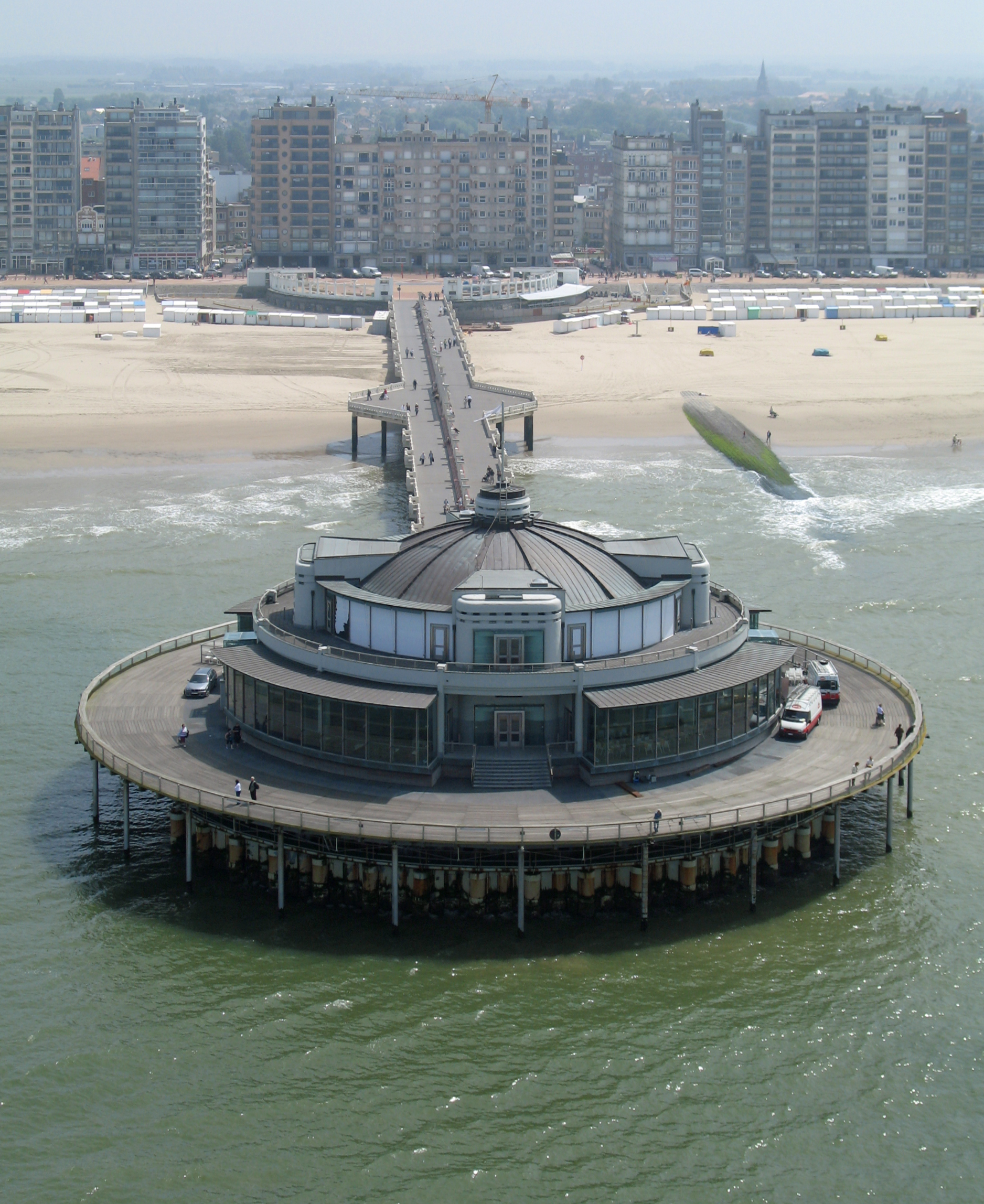
Seaside pier (Belgium Pier)

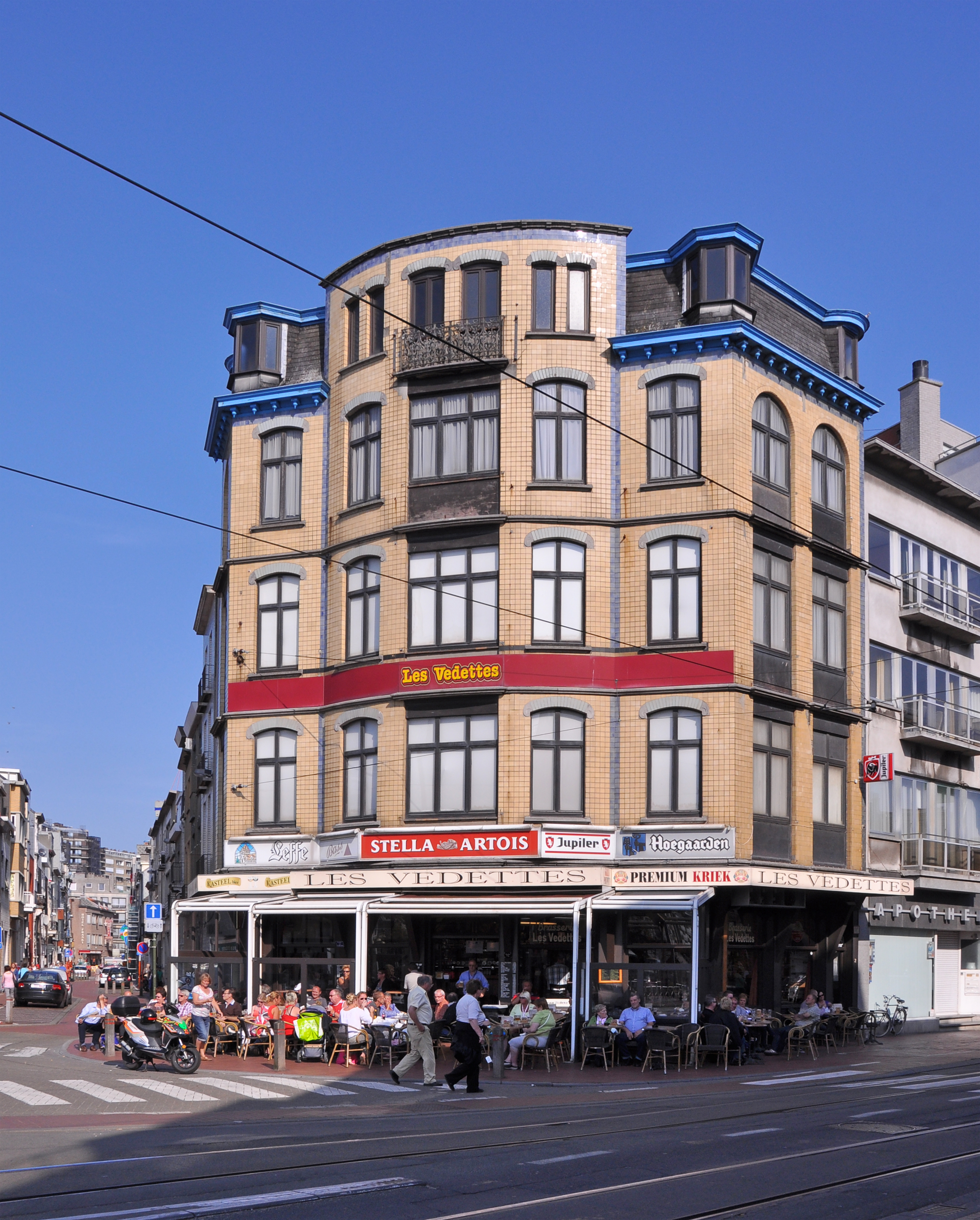
City view

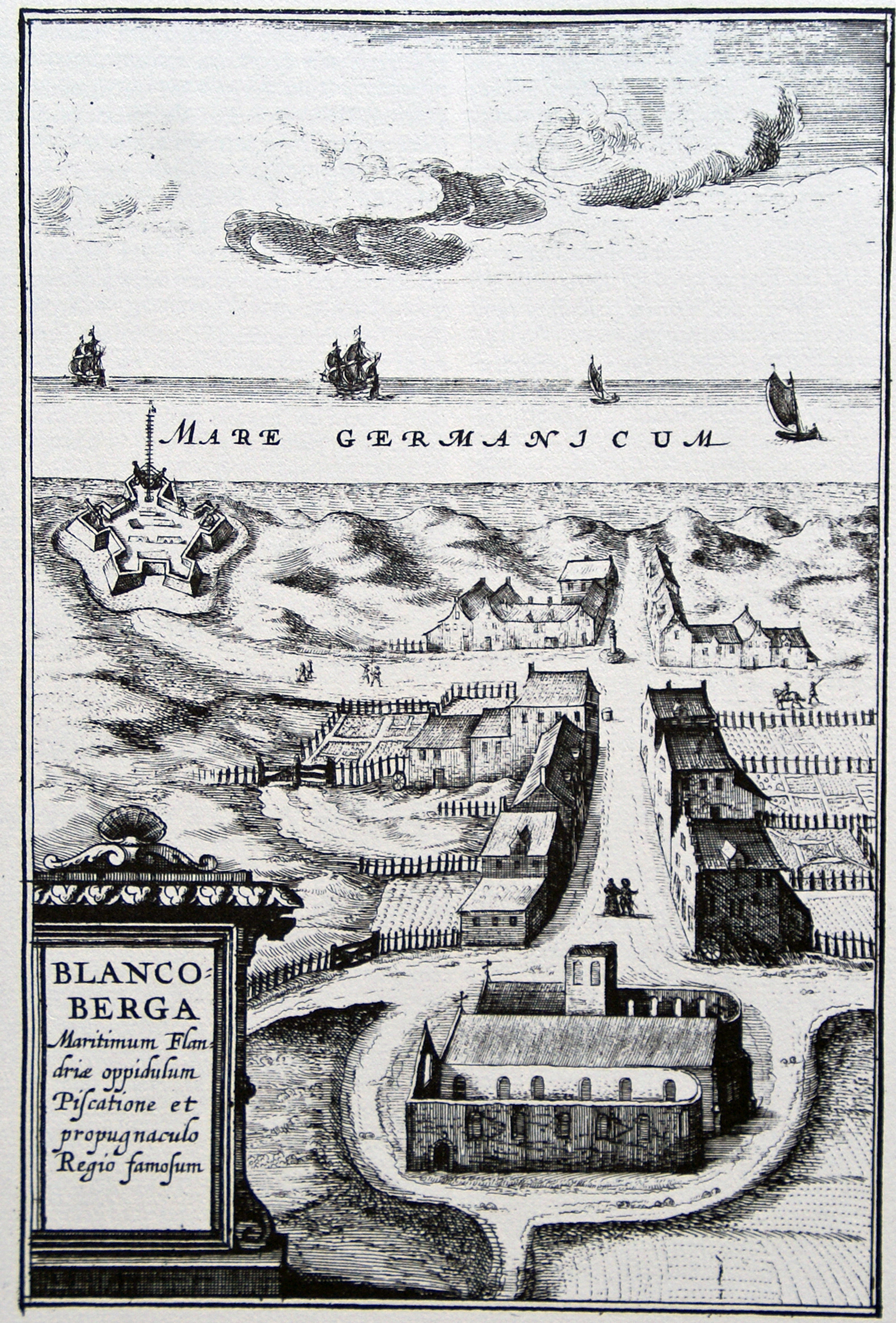
Blankenberge in 1641

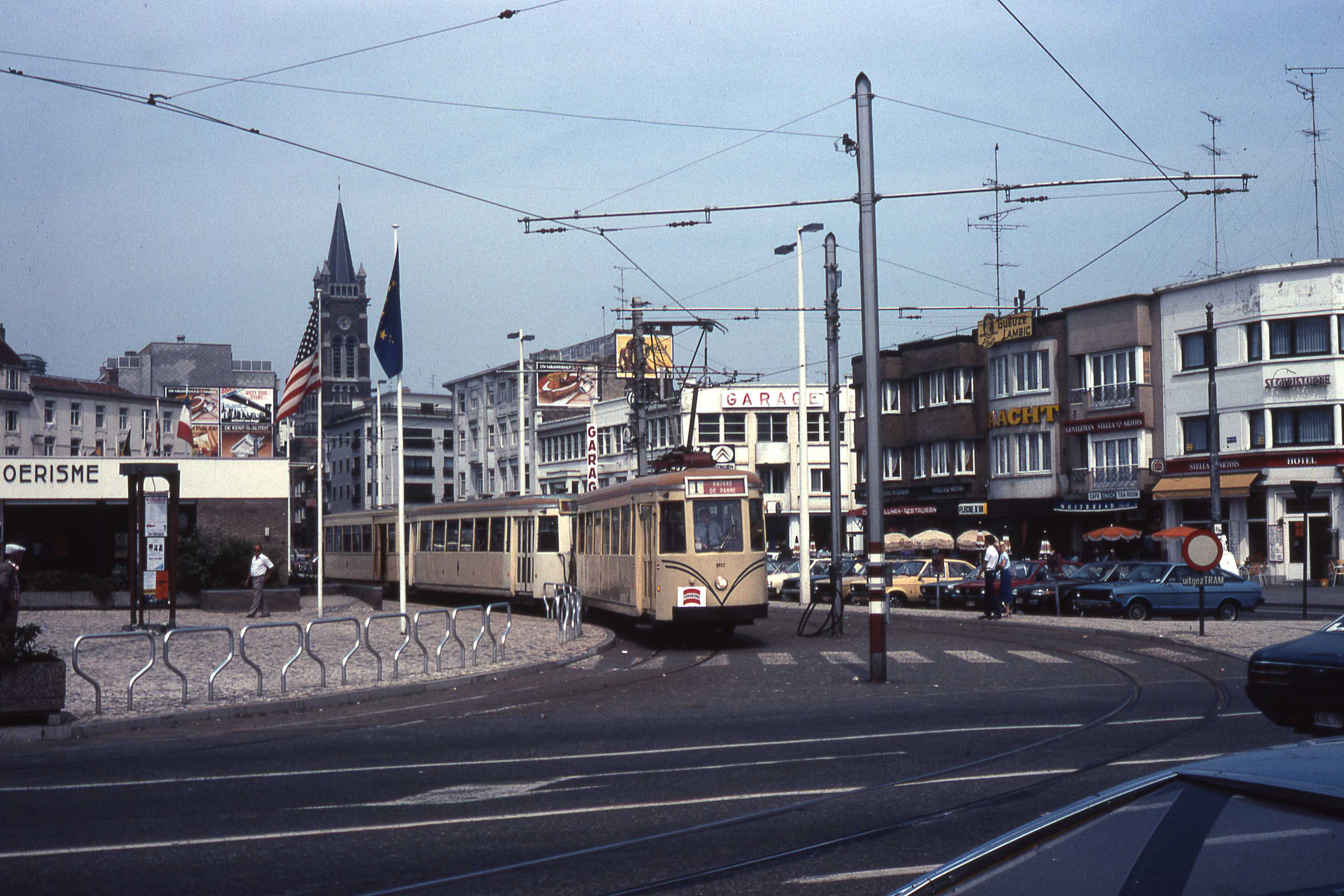
Classic tram in 1980s

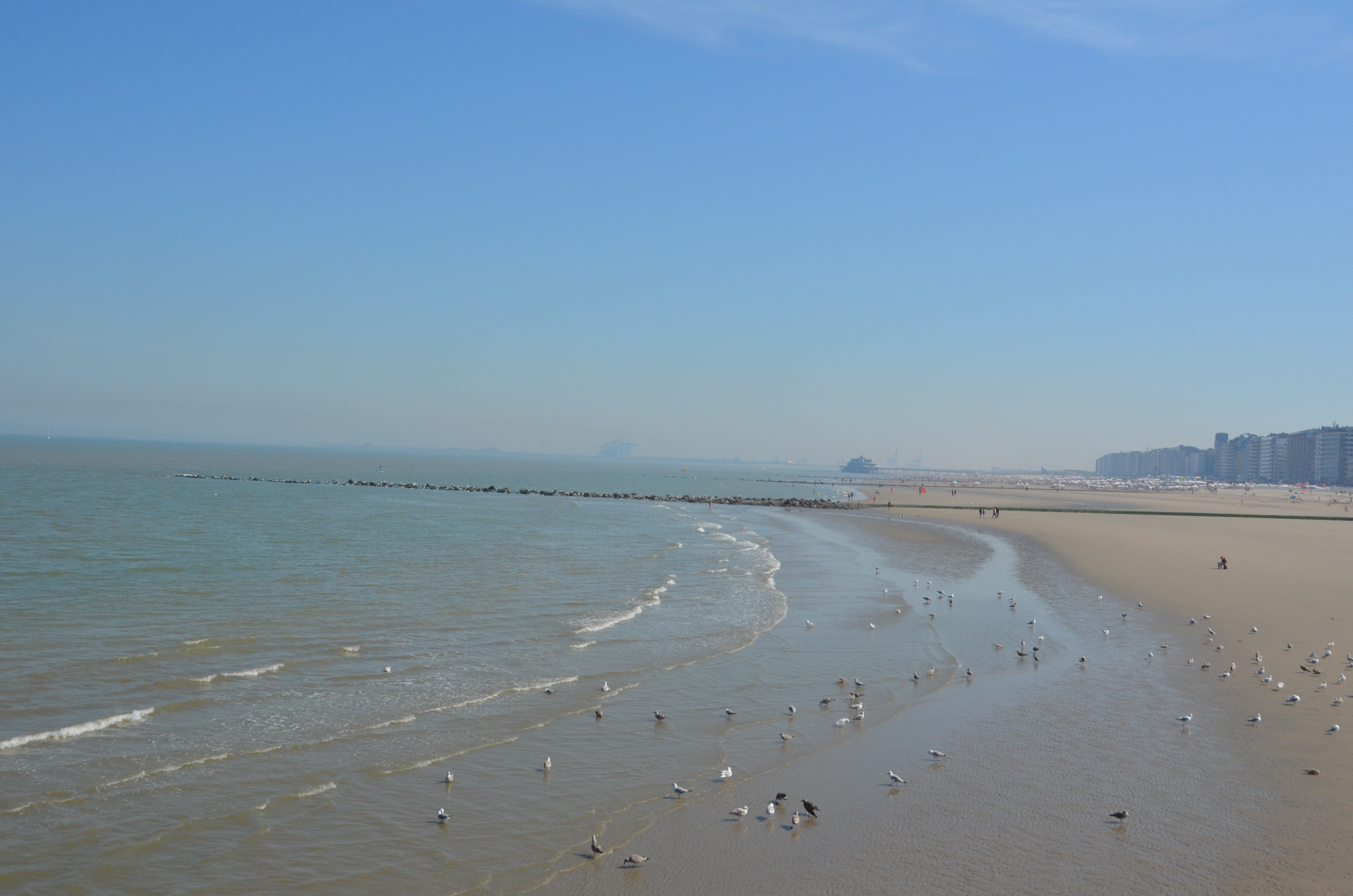
Sight of Blankenberge beach on the morning

== Twin towns ==
Blankenberge is twinned with:

- Minamiboso, Chiba, Japan

Since 1994, in August a couple of students from Minamiboso visit Blankenberge and live with families over here. Afterworth students from Blankenberge go and visit Minamiboso for eight days. This is organised by vzw 'Tweedaagse Voettocht van Blankenberge'.
