= Sellin Pier =

Pier in Sellin, Germany

Coordinates: 54°23′01″N 13°41′57″E

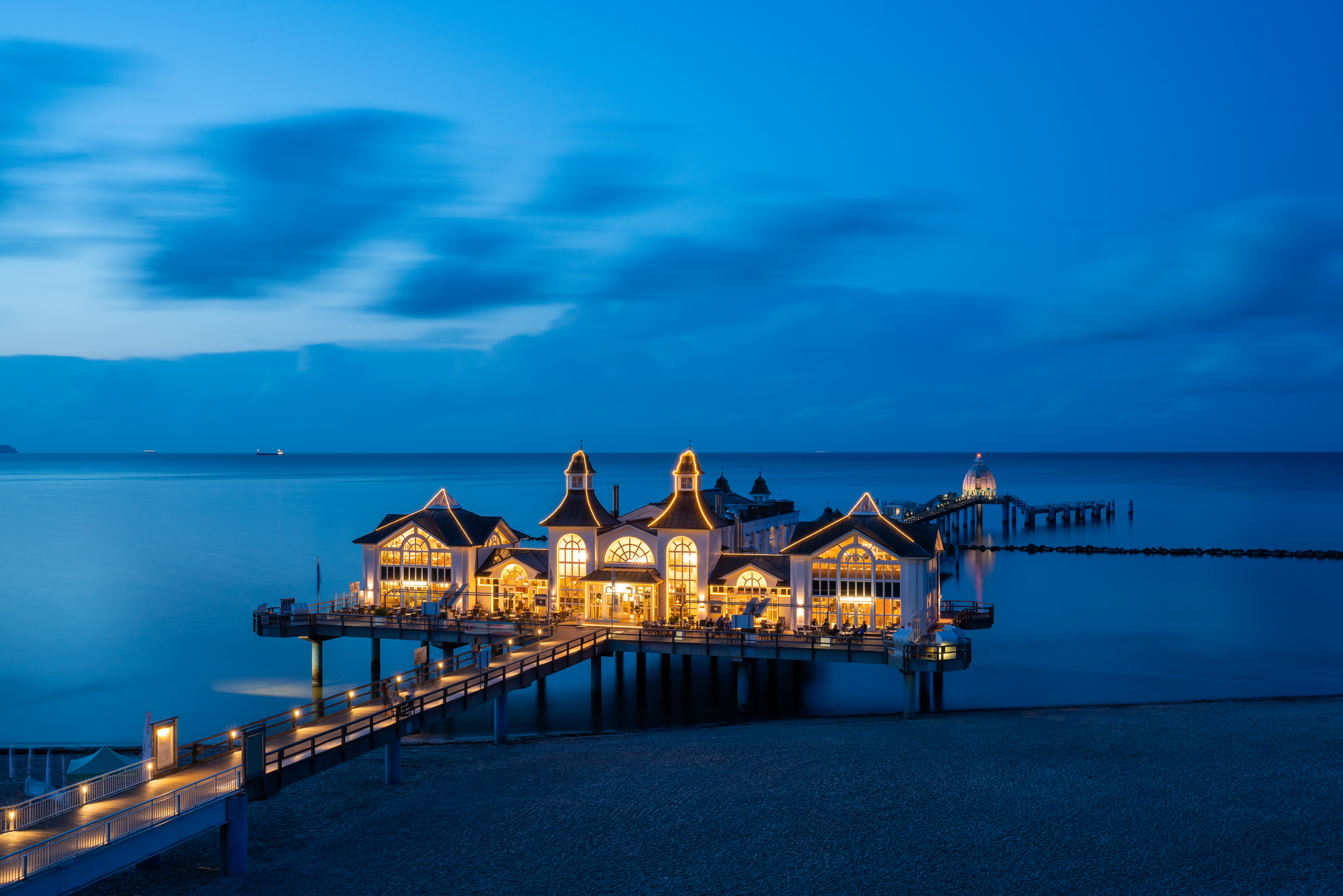
Illuminated Sellin Pier at dusk

Sellin Pier (German: Seebrücke Sellin) is a pier in the Baltic seaside resort of Sellin on the German island of Rügen. The pier has a restaurant near the beach over the water and has a diving gondola (Tauchgondel).

== History ==
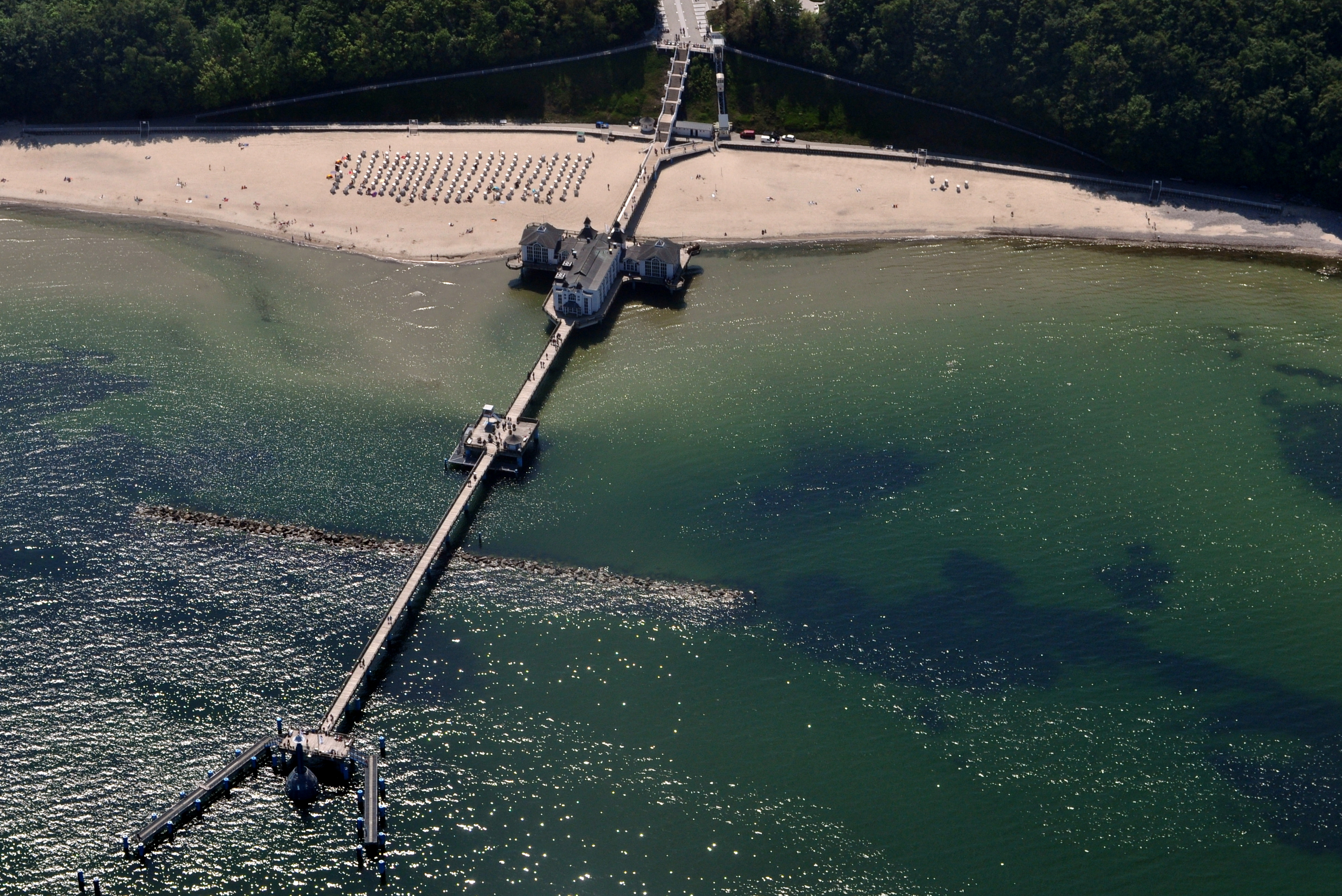
Sellin Pier from the air (2011)

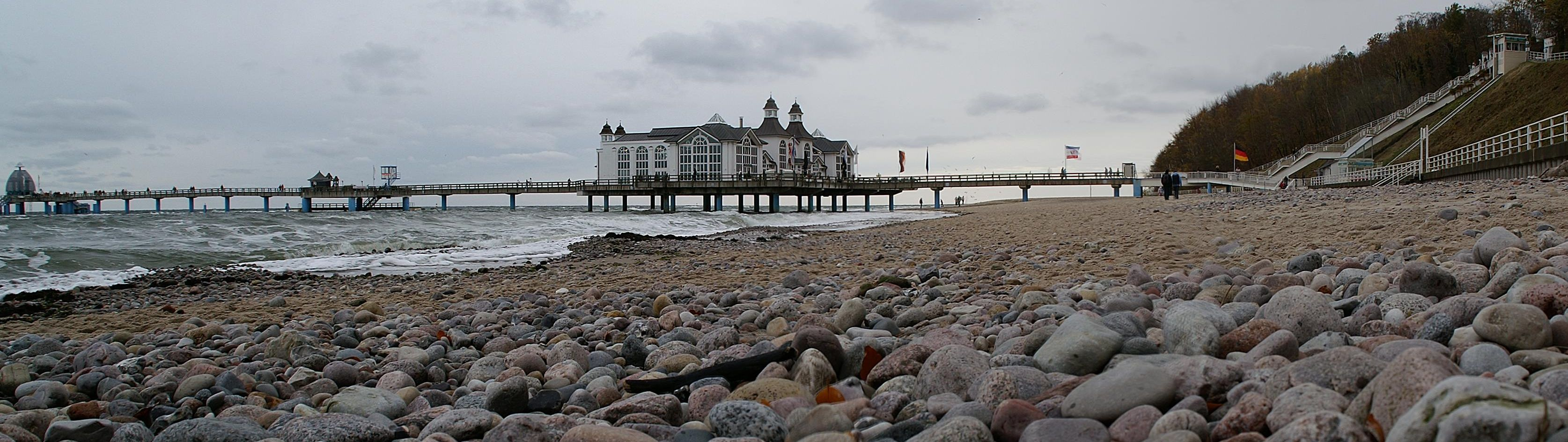
Panorama

Initial plans in 1901 foresaw a 60-metre-long landing stage, but this was deemed insufficient due to the very high number of anticipated visitors. The first 508-metre long pier with a restaurant was built in 1906. Pack ice damaged the structure in 1918; in 1920 the bridge head was destroyed by fire. In 1924, the bridge was again damaged by ice. In 1925 a new pier was built with a platform and concert hall, that had a length of approximately 500 metres. This bridge was destroyed in severe ice conditions in the winter of 1941/1942. The undamaged bridge house survived, however, and from 1950s to the 1970s was the site of a popular dance hall. During this time, however, the structure of the building was neglected and the dilapidated bridgehead, including its structures, had to be demolished in 1978.

In 1991 the President of Germany, Richard von Weizsäcker, visited Sellin and his visit prompted active support for this structure's rebuilding. On 27 August 1992, reconstruction began in several sections based on models of the buildings from 1906 and 1925. On 20 December 1997, Sellin honorary citizen Hans Knospe symbolically cut the ribbon for at the handover of the structure. The official opening of the new pier, including its restaurant, was held on 2 April 1998. At 394 metres, it is the longest pier on the island.

After water damage was found in October 2011 the restaurant was closed for some time.
