= Heringsdorf Pier =

Longest pier in Germany

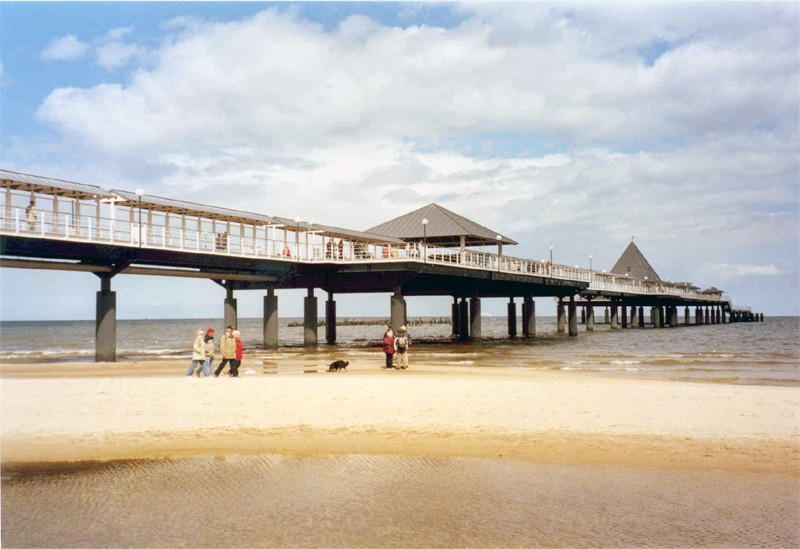
- Heringsdorf Pier
- Type: Pleasure Pier
- Coordinates: 53°57′26″N 14°10′19″E
- Official name: Seebrücke Heringsdorf

Characteristics
- Total length: 508 metres (1,667 ft)

History
- Opening date: 1995

Heringsdorf Pier (German: Seebrücke Heringsdorf) - a pier located in Heringsdorf, with a length of 508 metres; stretching out into the Baltic Sea, on the island of Usedom; in Germany.

In the years of 1891–1893, a wooden pier was built in the settlement of Heringsdorf, which at that time was the longest pier in Europe. The locals on the island of Usedom called the pier after the German Emperor Wilhelm II (Kaiser Wilhelm Brücke). The whole structure of the pier was decorated and housed numerous shops and restaurants. In 1958, the whole pier was burned down by a fire. The current pier's construction began on May 27, 1994. The current pier was complete on June 3, 1995. The current pier houses a Museum of the Concert Shell, cinema, café, restaurant, fitness centre, tourist gift shops and a holiday village.
