= Płock Pier =

Raised waterfront structure in Poland

Pier in Płock
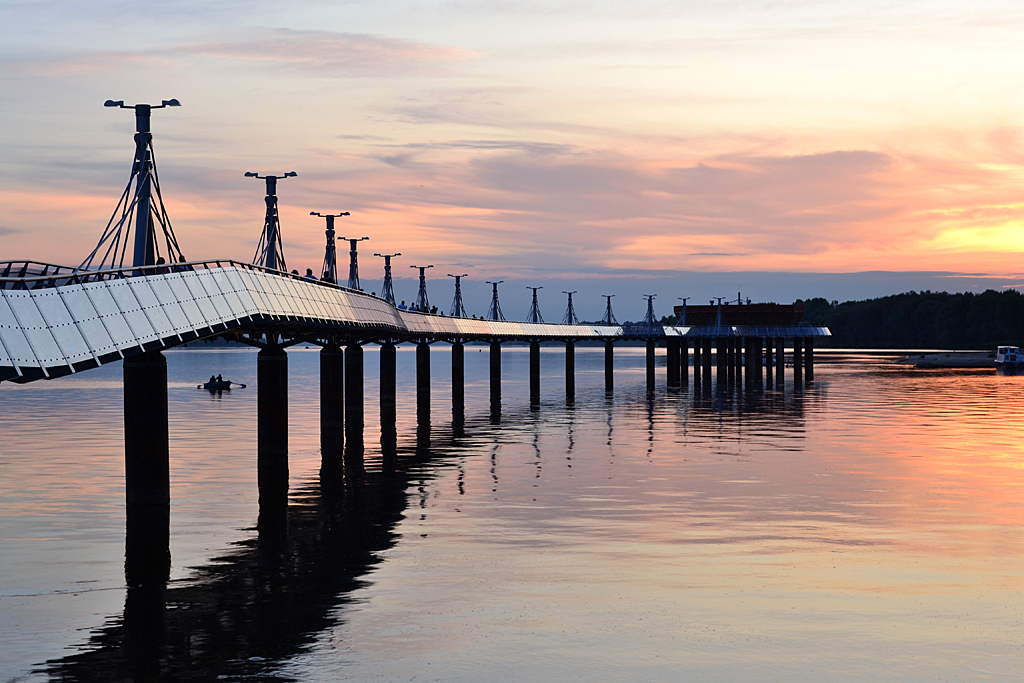
- The pier in Płock, Poland. The view westwards.
- Type: Pleasure Pier
- Carries: Pedestrians
- Spans: Vistula River
- Location: Płock, Mazovia; Poland
- Coordinates: 52°32′24″N 19°41′08″E
- Official name: Molo w Płocku
- Maintained by: City of Płock – Municipal Sports Center in Płock
- Toll: Open to the public

Characteristics
- Construction: Company Bilfinger Berger Budownictwo from Warsaw, Company Navimor-Invest from Gdańsk, Company Prywatne Przedsiębiorstwo Budowlane Alpex Mariusz Skrętowski from Płock, Company Henczke-Budownictwo from Płock
- Total length: 357.8 m (1,174 ft)
- Width: 5.3–15.3 m (17–50 ft)
- Clearance below: 3.5 m (11 ft) (At the normal level of the river)

History
- Designer: Company Modern Construction Systems from Poznań
- Opening date: 25 June 2011
- Płock Pier (Poland)

The Pier in Płock (Polish: Molo w Płocku, Polish pronunciation: [ˈmɔlɔ v ˈpwɔt͡sku]) is a pleasure pier in Płock, Poland, reaching into the Vistula River. The pier in Płock is also a part of the marina. The pedestrian pier in Płock is 358 meters (1174.54 feet) long, 5.3 meters (17.39 feet) wide, except for the end of the pier, which is 15.3 meters (50.20 feet) wide. At the end of the pier is situated a restaurant. The pier is a steel structure.

== History ==
A distinctive feature of the pier in Płock is the fact that this structure was made mostly parallel to the riverbank. It's the only pier of this type in Poland. A cafe is at the end of the pier. The pier is adapted for people using wheelchairs. The pier is open all through the year. Admission to the pier is free.

Construction of the pier lasted from March 2010 till December 2014. The general contractor for the investment was a consortium headed by the company Bilfinger Berger Budownictwo.

== Gallery ==
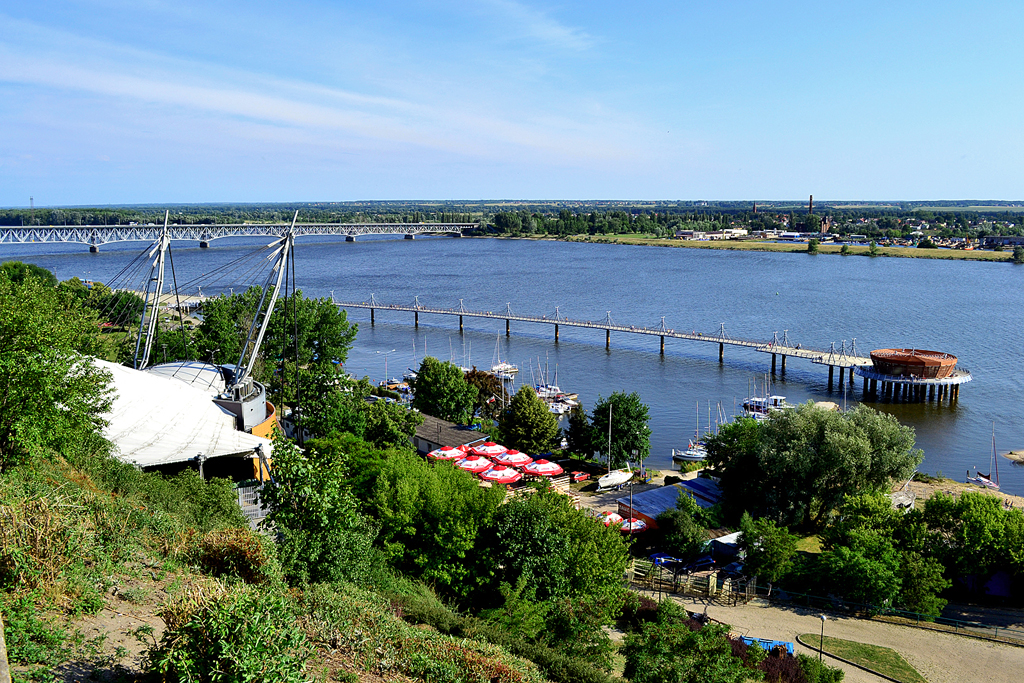
The pier in Płock, Poland. The view from the Vistula River escarpment.

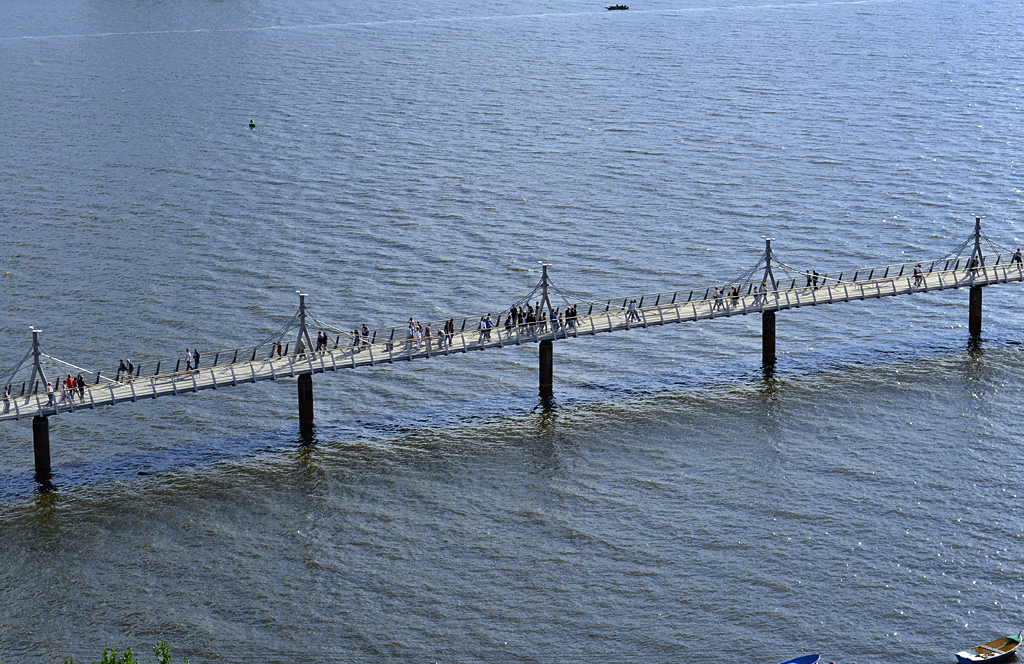
The pier in Płock, Poland. The view from the Tumskie Hill.

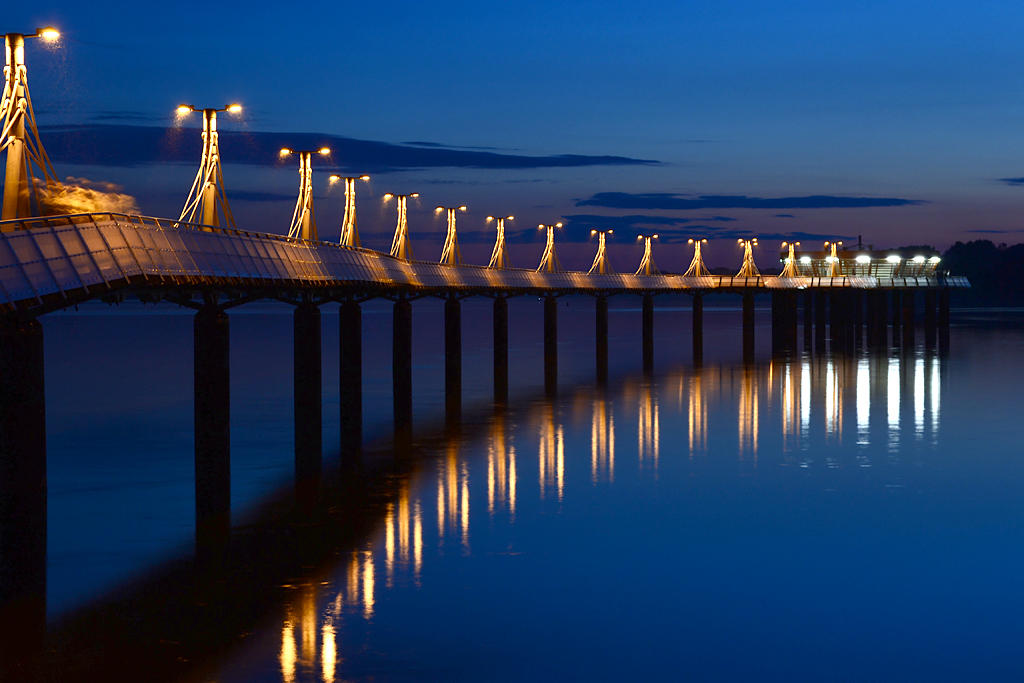
The pier in Płock, Poland. The view westwards by night.

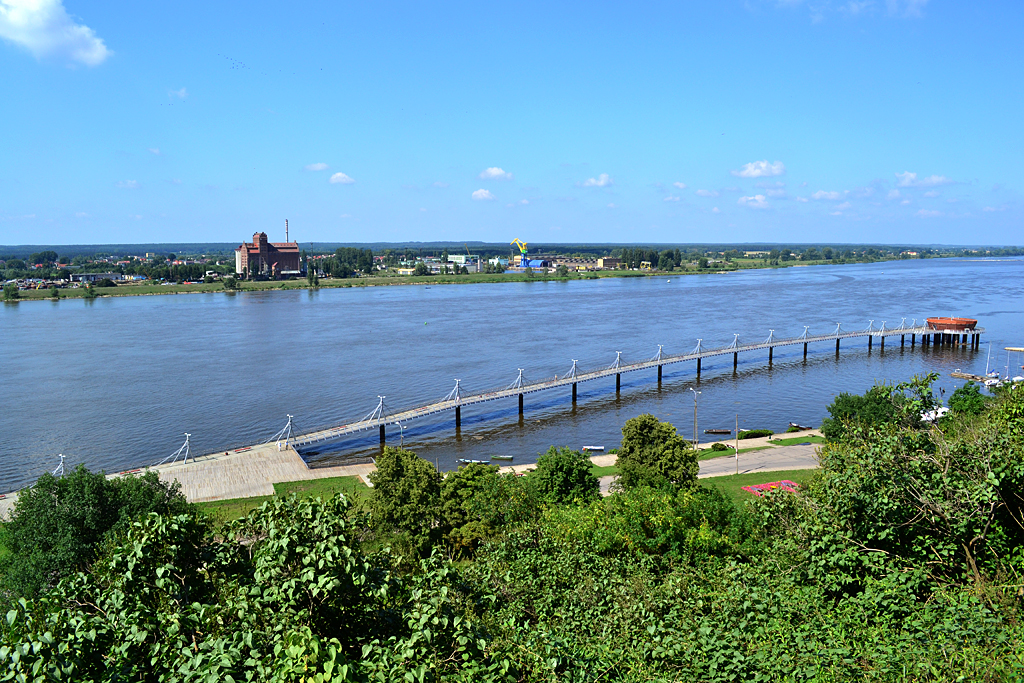
The pier in Płock, Poland. The view from the Tumskie Hill.

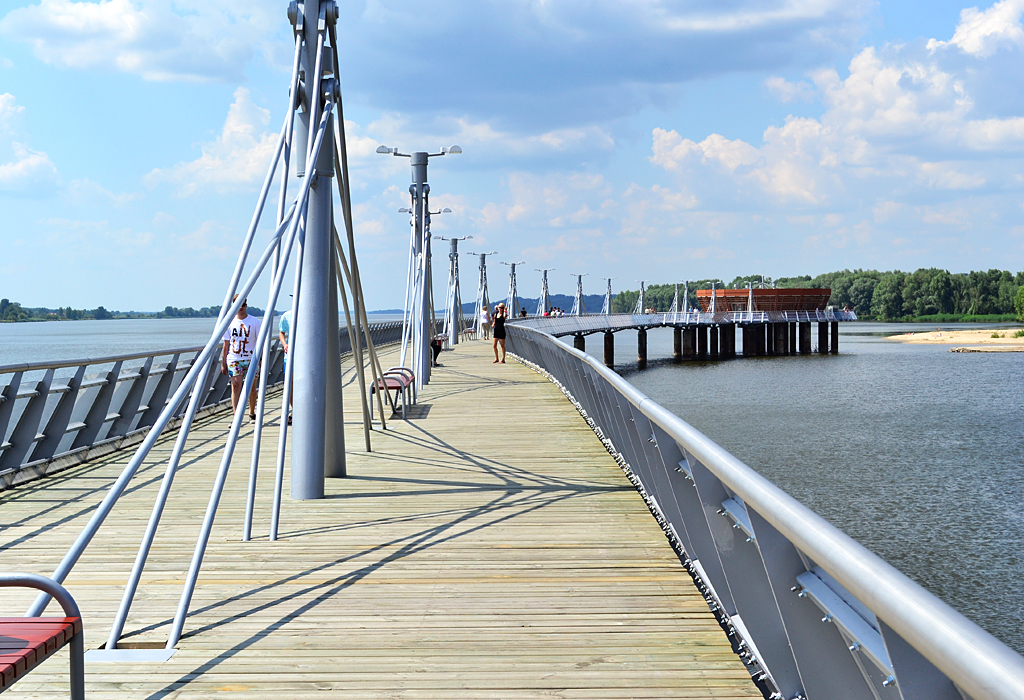
The pier in Płock, Poland. The view westwards.

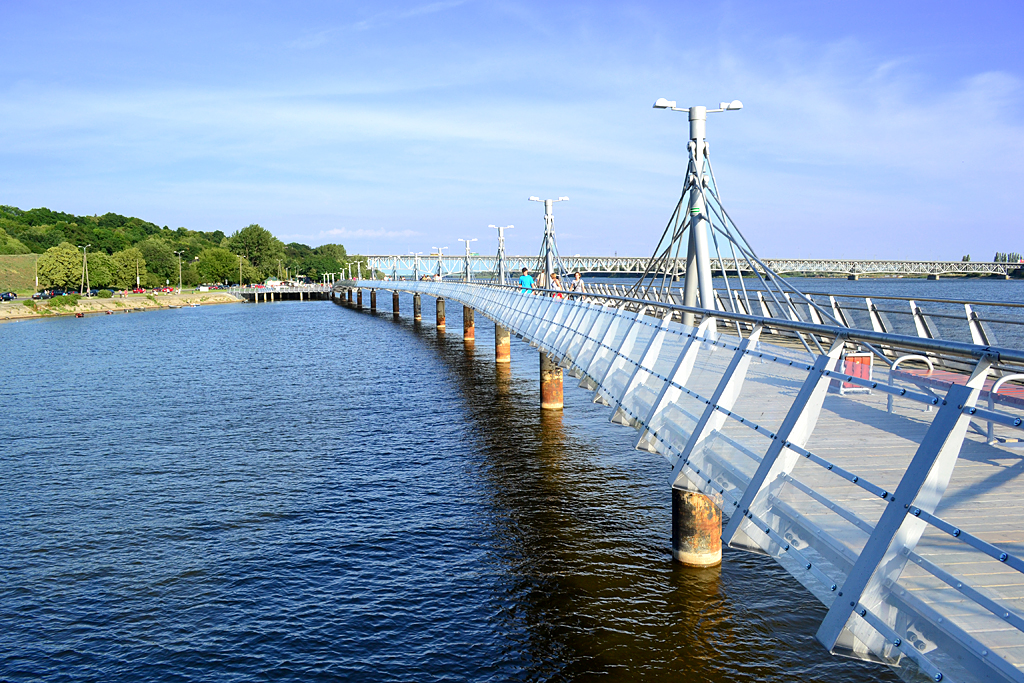
The pier in Płock, Poland. The view eastwards, in front of the Legions of Marshal Józef Piłsudski Bridge.

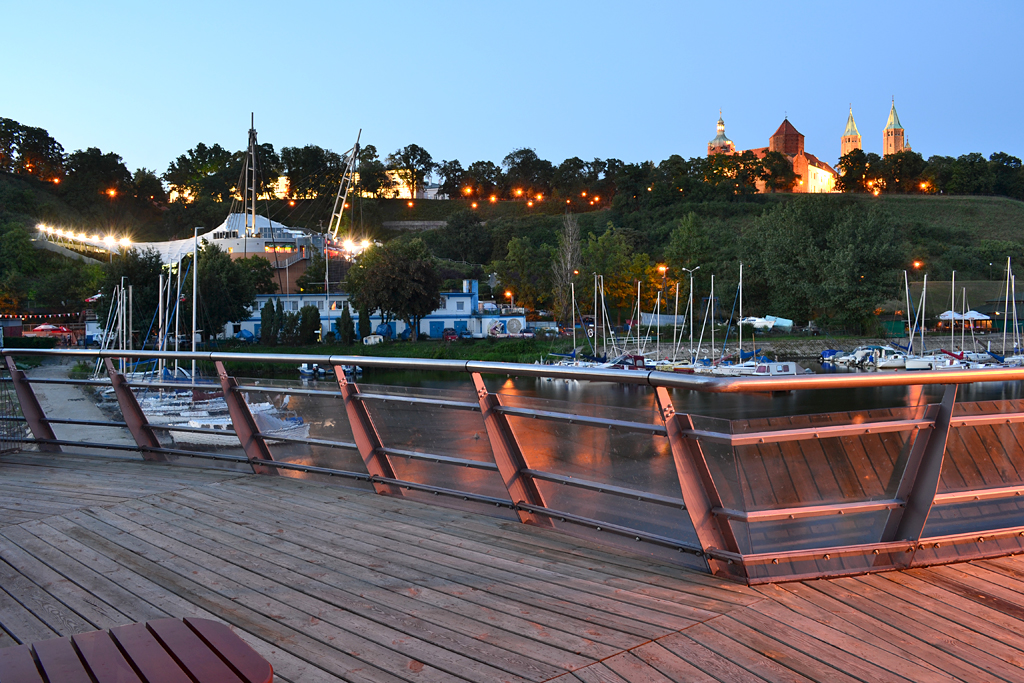
The pier in Płock, Poland. The view on the Tumskie Hill and the amphitheatre by night from the pier, with Płock Cathedral and the castle.

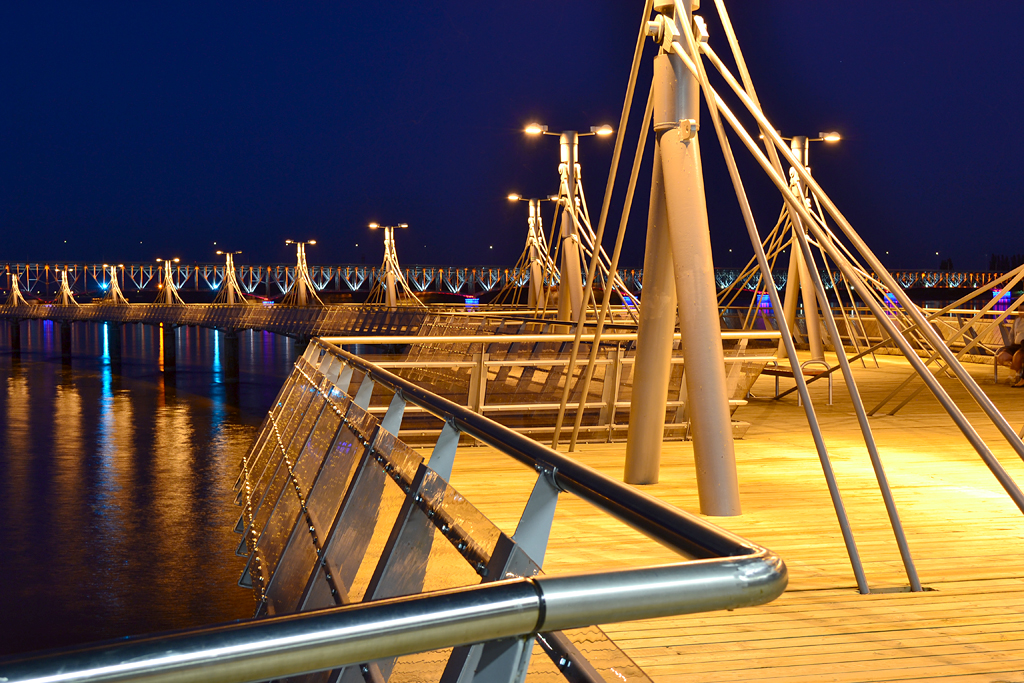
The pier in Płock, Poland. The view eastwards by night.

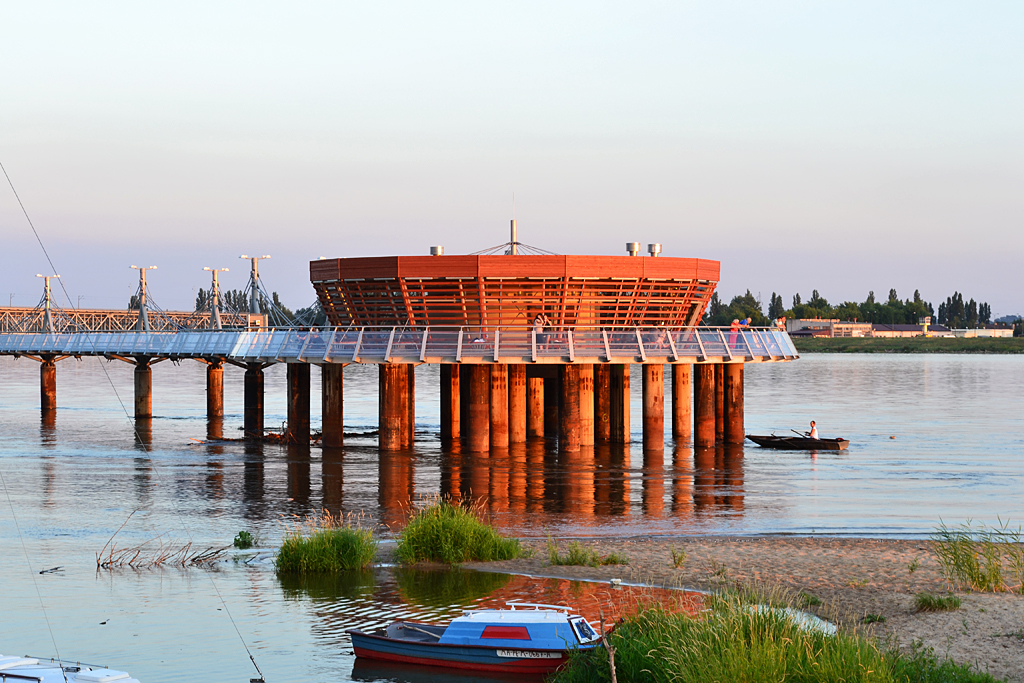
The pier in Płock, Poland. The view on the restaurant from the beach.
