= Jurata Pier =

Pier in Jurata, Poland

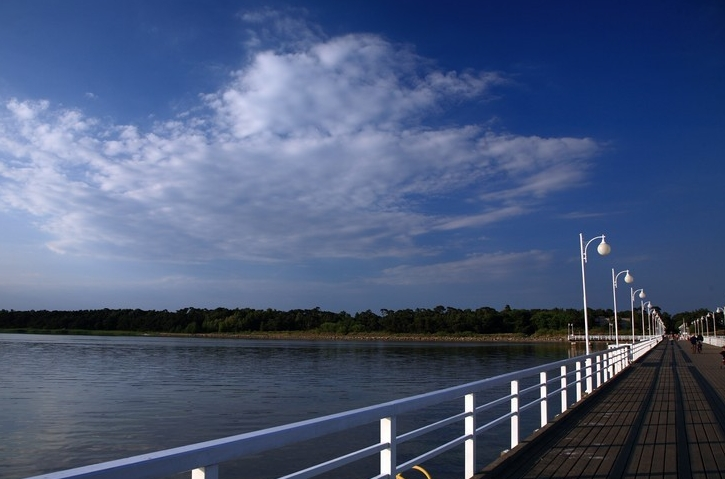
- Jurata Pier
- Type: Pleasure Pier
- Coordinates: 54.6818°N 18.7108°E
- Official name: Molo w Juracie

Characteristics
- Total length: 320 metres (1,050 ft)

History
- Opening date: 1970s

Jurata Pier (Polish: Molo w Juracie) - a wooden pier with a length of 320 metres, located in the southern part of Jurata (on the coast of the Puck Bay). The pier was built in the 1970s. The pier is one of two in Jastarnia. The pier is part of the Międzymorze Promenade.
