= Belgium Pier =

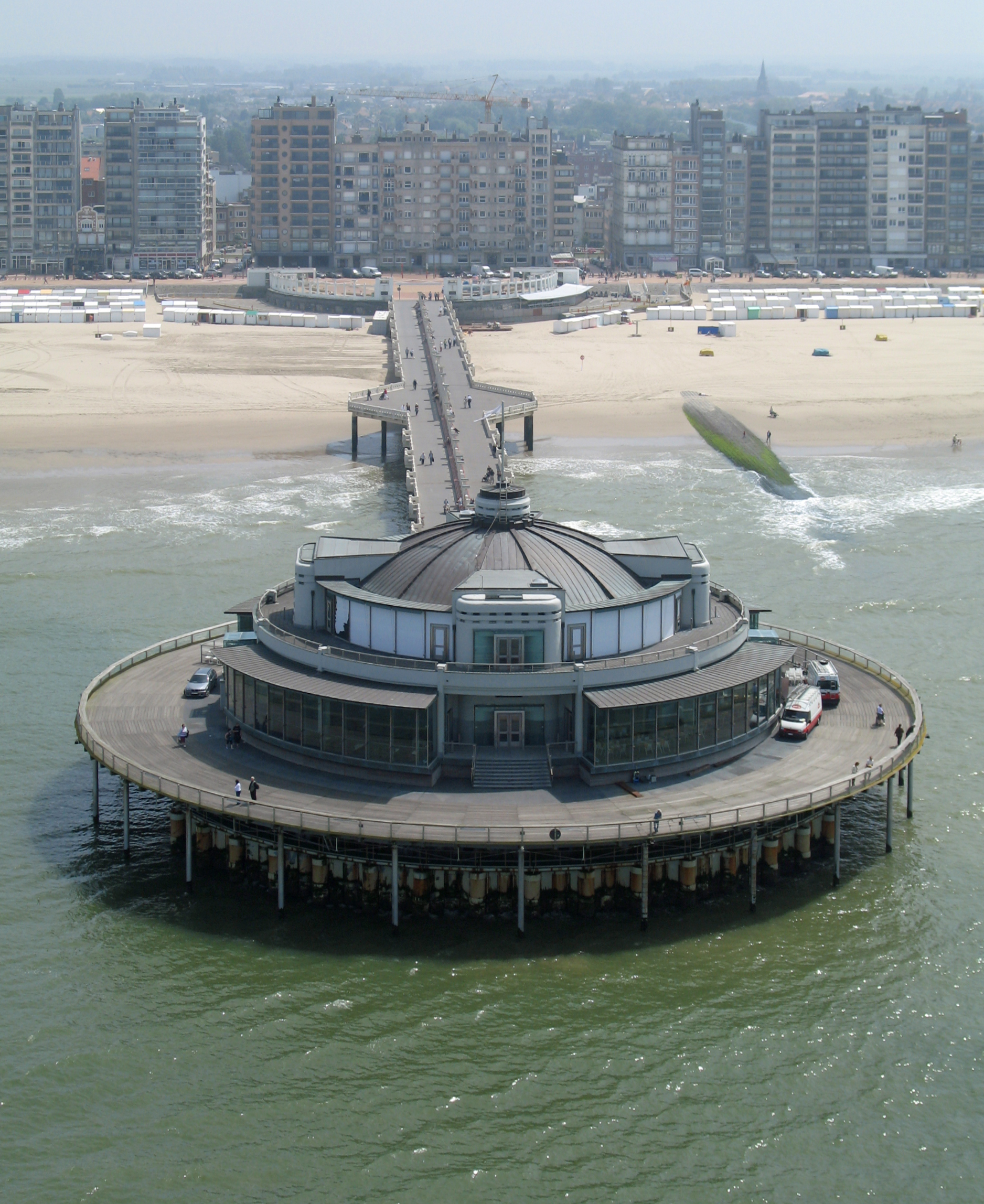
The Belgium Pier

The Belgium Pier is a pier in Blankenberge, Belgium. It was built in 1933 after an Art Deco design by architect Jules Soete. The concrete structure stretches 350 meters out into the North Sea. The Belgium Pier replaced an earlier structure that was the first pier at the Atlantic and North Sea coasts of the European continent, and the only other pier like it is the Scheveningen Pier in the Netherlands.
