= Uitkerke =

Coordinates: 51.3033°N 3.1429°E

Uitkerke is in West Flanders and is part of the coastal city of Blankenberge, Belgium. The two neighboring communities were officially united in the late 1970s.

== History ==
Uitkerke, as an independent village, is more than a thousand years old. Historically, since its main occupation was agriculture, it once occupied more in territory than its neighbor, Blankenberge.

== Derivation ==
Translated from the Flemish Uitkerke means "outer church".
