= Gdynia Orłowo Pier =

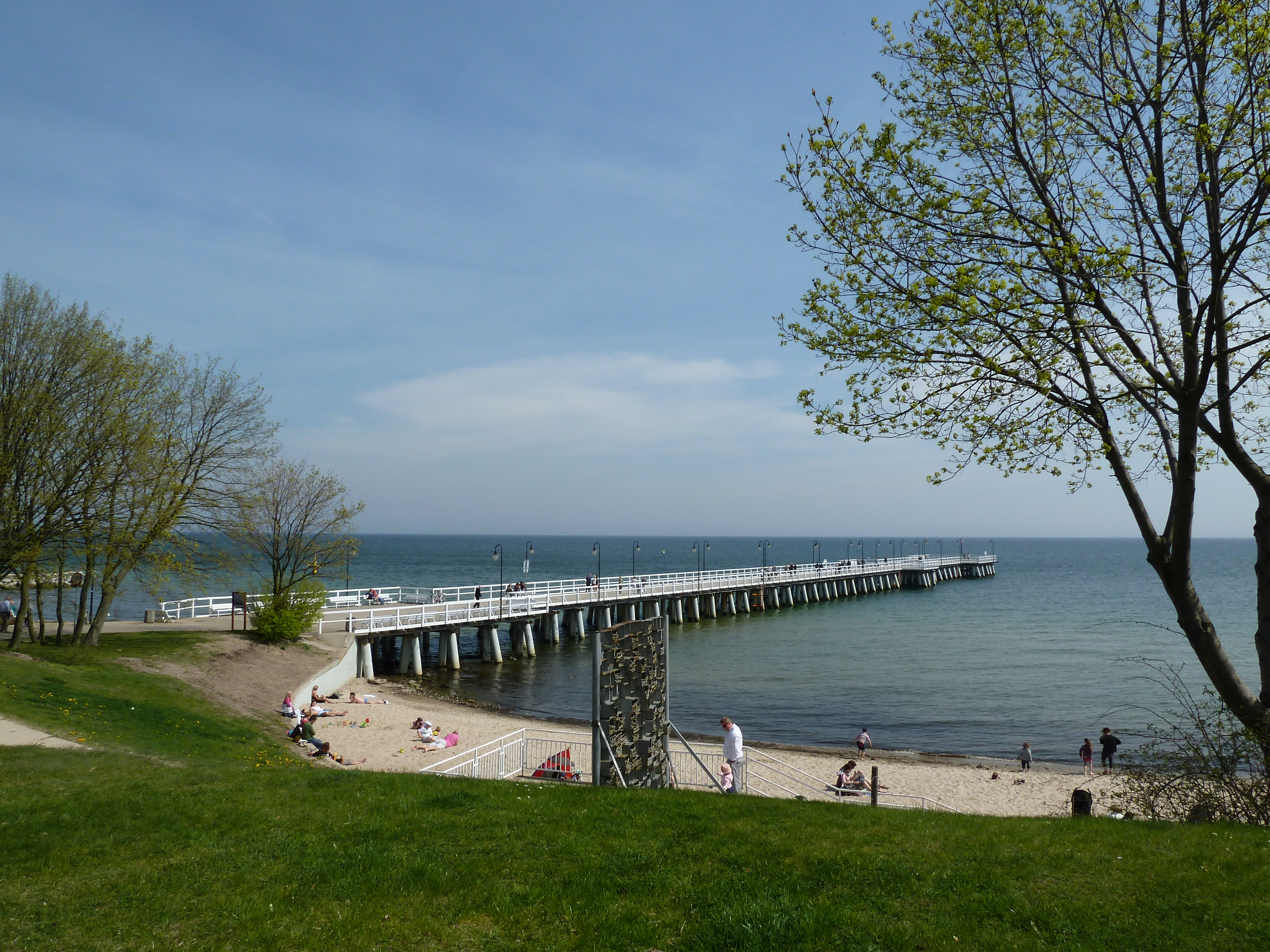
- Gdynia Orłowo pier
- Type: Pleasure Pier
- Coordinates: 54.2848°N 18.3354°E
- Official name: Molo w Juracie

Characteristics
- Construction: 1914-1918 1935-1936 2006-2007
- Total length: 180 metres (590 ft)

History
- Opening date: 1914-1918

Gdynia Orłowo Pier (Polish: Molo w Gdyni Orłowie) - a wooden pier located in the coastal borough of Gdynia.

The first pier in Orłowo was built during World War I. The pier functioned as a Pleasure Pier and as a promenade for the nearby resort. The pier was expanded during the 1920s (the region was then part of the Second Polish Republic); the pier had the length of 115 metres and functioned as a jetty for small ships. In the late 1920s, as the popularity of Orłowo grew, so did competition with the nearby resort of Sopot (then part of the Free City of Danzig); which led to the pier being expanded to 430 metres in length. In June, 1935 the resort of Orłowo became a borough of Gdynia.

In 1949, the pier was devastated by a huge storm which destroyed over half of the structure. In 1953, the remainder of the pier was renovated. Currently, the pier has a length of 180 metres.

Nearby to the pier, is located the Summer Stage of the Gdynia Theatre (Scena Letnia Teatru Miejskiego w Gdyni) and the Orłowo Cliff.
