= Thao people =

Ethnic group indigenous to Taiwan

Thao
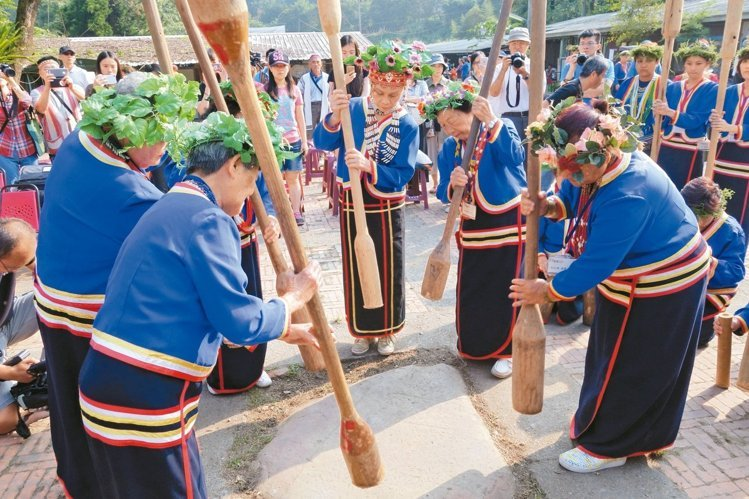

Total population
- 890 (2024)

Regions with significant populations
- Taiwan

Languages
- Mandarin, Taiwanese Hokkien, Thao

Religion
- Animism, Buddhism

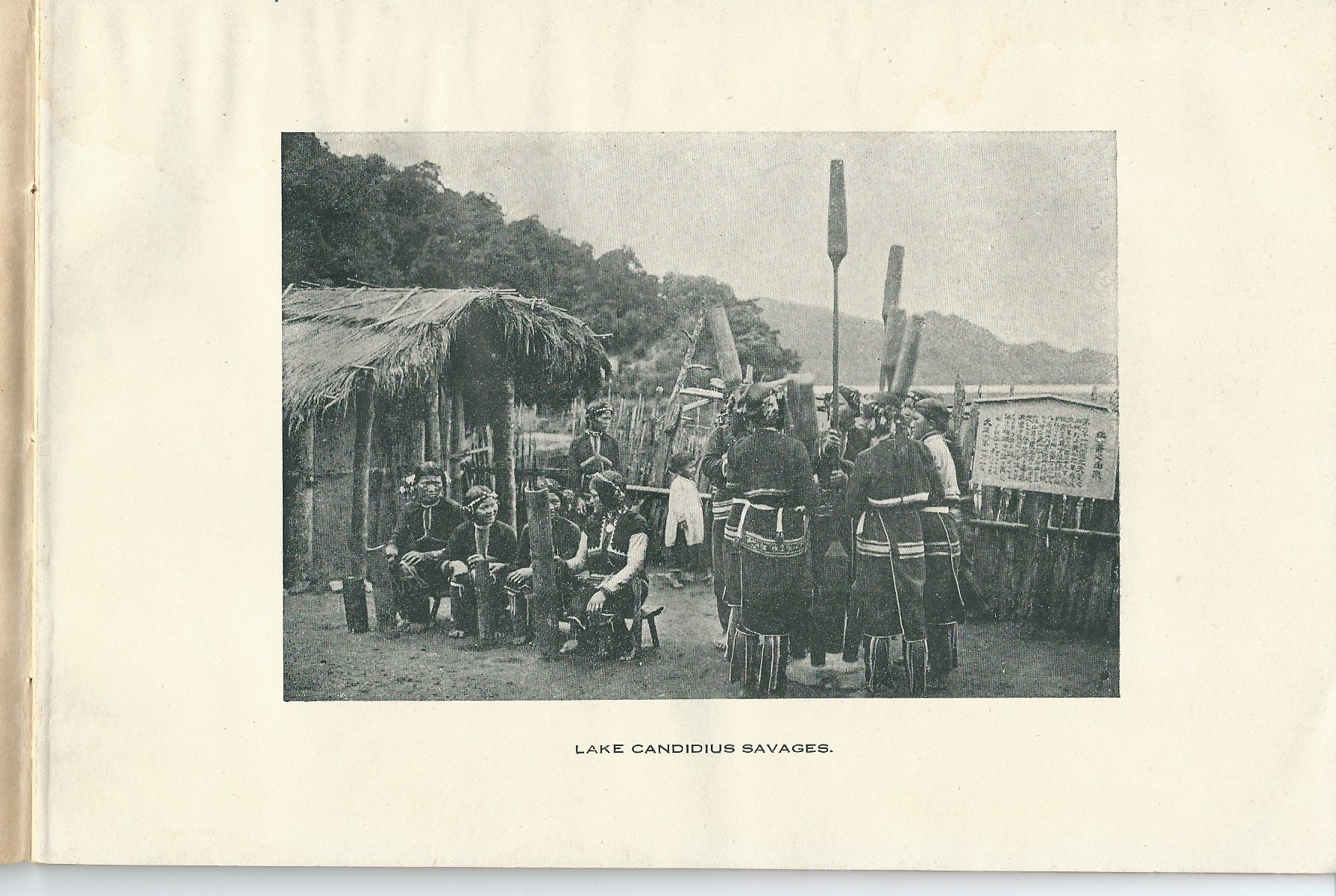
Thao at Sun Moon Lake, photo from a 1926 brochure of the Government of Formosa

The Thao (Thao: /ˈθaʊ/; Chinese: 邵; pinyin: Shào; Pe̍h-ōe-jī: Siāu) are a small group of Taiwanese indigenous peoples who have lived near Sun Moon Lake (Zintun, Lake Candidius) in central Taiwan for at least a century, and probably since the time of the Qing dynasty. The Thao people numbered around 800, making them one of the smallest of all of the recognized indigenous peoples in Taiwan (a number of indigenous peoples, both smaller and larger than the Thao in population, remain unrecognized by the Taiwanese government).

Despite their small group size, the Thao have retained their customs, beliefs and traditional culture and language until now, though they have been assimilated into mainstream culture as well. Most of the members of this ethnic group work in the tourism industry at Sun Moon Lake. The Chi-Chi earthquake of 1999 damaged or destroyed 80% of the houses of the Thao.

== Language ==
The Thao people have their own language, the Thao language, which is nearly extinct and spoken by only a few, mostly elders, of the (already small) Thao ethnic population. The language has been sinicized. Most people who speak Thao are bilingual or trilingual and can speak Mandarin Chinese and/or Taiwanese as well. The Thao language part of the Austronesian language family, and is classified a Western Plains Formosan language - the last surviving of that group, which was once spoken across the center-western plains of Taiwan before being supplanted by Sinitic languages. The Western Plains Formosan languages have been proposed to form part of a Northern Formosan branch of Austronesian along with aboriginal languages of northern Taiwan. The Thao language has loanwords from the Bunun language, spoken by the Bunun ethnic group of which the Thao cooperated with as well as intermarried.

== History ==
According to Thao oral history, the Thao people originally live in Chiayi, later moved to Alishan Range, before eventually settling around Sun Moon Lake as well as Lalu Island in the middle of the lake. According to the legend, they saw a deer and wanted to eat it, so they chased it until they arrived in the side of Sun Moon lake. Then the deer ran into the water, leaving the Thao by themselves. They could only wait. The Thao people then slept at Sun Moon Lake. One of the elders dreamed of a fairy in a white cloak. He said to them "I am the deer that led you here. This place is your promised land. Please don't leave, because generations will come."

== Culture ==
=== Clothing ===
The Thao clothing style is known for its use of geometric patterns, and its use of brown, blue, gray and black. The dagobun is a famous Thao clothing, made of a cloth knitted with flax yarn and dog fur.

Women’s traditional clothing mainly consists of a head scarf, a sleeved blouse, a corset, a waist skirt, a belt, knee breeches, and a crown made of flowers and plants. The head scarf used to be made of black cotton, but it is now more commonly made of red and black strips of cloth, with sequins and pearls sewn onto it. Small beaded tassels are hanging from the sideburns, with a belt fastened to the back of the head. The corset is a one-piece garment that functions as a skirt and is made of two rectangular pieces of cotton that reach to the knees and are fastened diagonally to each other over the left and right shoulders, and then tied with a belt.

Men’s traditional clothing consists of headgear, headwear, chest wear, vest, skirt, breech-less trousers, and leather shoes. It is made of leather, linen and bark.

=== Thao Wooden Pestle (musical instrument) ===
Understanding the materiality and symbolism of the wooden pestle is essential before examining its social uses. Because the Thao live in the Sun Moon Lake region where there is a high density of trees, wood is the most accessible and practical material for making everyday objects. This material allowed the Thao community to easily produce the wooden pestle, making this practice accessible and affordable to a large part of the population and turning the instrument into an inclusive object. Moreover, the use of wood also reflects the importance given to nature in Thao culture. The environment is not separated from social life but is fully part of it.

The shape of the instrument is also important to consider for understanding its social function. Originally, the wooden pestle was an object used by women of the community to pound millet, while men mainly worked in the fields. The instrument is therefore directly linked to the division of labor within Thao society. Additionally, in most cases, wooden pestles contain very little decoration or personalization. This simplicity highlights the importance of the group rather than the individual in Thao culture. Any member of the community can use any instrument, whether for work or during collective rituals.

The pestle itself is mainly made out of timber or cypress wood. The wood itself is important for the tones the pestle can make, denser wood will lower the frequency. The shape of the pestle is not cylindrical but tapering; this creates a complex vibration, which delivers a rich tone. The length of the pestle also changes the tone, the longer the pestle, the lower the tone. The pestle itself is made out of a wooden block, whereby the maker decided which pestle becomes which tone. When performing, each pestle will therefore have a unique tone and sound profile.

The Thao wooden pestle is a way for the Thao people to communicate through sound. According to Thao traditional knowledge, women strike stones with pestles to produce rhythmic sounds. Before a ritual, they perform the pestle song to notify the ancestral spirits and the hunters in the mountains that the ceremony is about to take place. The pestle song is an act of communication; a message sent across distance.

There is also one myth, "A Cai and Feng She" explains the origin of the Thao pestle song. In the story, a young hunter named A Cai go deep into the mountains to hunt but becomes exhausted and unable to return. His fiancée, Feng She, following the instruction sent by the gods, pounds a long pestle in a stone, make sounds while singing a joyful song. The sound of the pestle song reaches A Cai in the mountains, restoring his strength and guiding him home.

Today, facing a declining population the Thao people rely on key cultural elements to play a key role in keeping Thao society together. The performance of the wooden pestle is an important cultural ritual.

The performance of Thao pestles is a group activity that is closely tied to the community's social relationships and ethnic identity. While the performers seen in public are mostly women, it is not just a musical show. The performance is usually led and guided by tribal leaders, elders, and the Shinshii (female ritual specialists). They are the ones who communicate with the ancestral spirits (Apari). Therefore, the rhythms and the way they play must follow the traditional rules and taboos set by the Shinshii.

Pestle music is most commonly performed during Thao rituals. The Thao people believe that Lalu Island is the home of their highest ancestral spirits. Lus’an, the Thao New Year and ancestral festival, begins on the first day of the eighth lunar month. On the preceding evening, ritual pestle music is performed to announce the coming festival and call hunters home.

. Besides rituals, elders also use these occasions to teach younger people how to choose the right wood and practice the complex rhythms, which is how they pass down their culture.

==== History of the Pestle ====
During the period of Taiwan under Japanese rule, Thao pestle music became increasingly intertwined with colonial tourism and state performances. Following infrastructure changes aimed to transform the colony from an agricultural to a more industrial based society, many Thao people were forced to relocate from their ancestral lands near the Sun Moon Lake. Thao performers used wooden pestles in dances and musical presentations for members of the Japanese royal family to help bring about tourism within the area, as well as at exhibitions and official celebrations in Taiwan and Japan.

After Japanese colonial rule followed confusion within the Taiwanese population regarding national identity between the Japanese and KMT. As a result, the pestle and music dance continued to be utilized under the KMT through movies and other media to help bring forth national identity in Taiwan. It is throughout these political periods that the Thao people were often subjected to assimilation by the acting governments to within the Han population.

Today, the Thao pestle music and dance continues to be performed in festivals and tourism activities to not only bring awareness to their traditions but to also preserve their cultural identity.

==== Related Cultural Practices and Revitalisation ====
One of the historical purposes of wooden pestle playing during Lus'an (new year) ceremonies was to call the men back to the village from their territorial-defense and hunting positions in nearby mountains. However, the pressures of colonial-modernity eventually resulted in the ‘sleeping’ of this tradition (called murura) with over six decades passing without Thao men spending the lead-up period to Lu’san in the mountains (Song & Dance, 2022).

In the TaiwanPlus television feature “Song & Dance”, a Thao man describes learning of the lost tradition as a child: “when I was little the Elders told me that boys should not be at home on new year’s eve [and instead] we should wait until we hear the pestle sound to return” (Song & Dance, 2022, 8:57 - 9:10). Now part of a generation with children of their own, he has been involved in its revival, citing the inter-relatedness of Thao cultural practices as the central motive: “if murura goes away then mashtatun [also called malhakan] will lose its meaning too” (Song & Dance, 2022, 9:39 - 9:49). The segment’s presenter, another Thao man of the same generation, later mirrors this sentiment, asking: “how can we maintain this tradition without recovering its purpose?” (Song & Dance, 2022, 9:52 - 9:56).

His question speaks directly to the complexity of the Thao’s cultural survival through evolving conditions of coloniality. While the widespread suppression of Indigenous culture under Japanese and Chinese nationalist rule could have resulted in the loss of Thao pestle musicking altogether, instead through its ‘exoticisation’, the conditions for the continuation of taturtur production and playing practices were maintained. Thus, the invention of the performative ensemble (masbabiar) in response to Japanese colonial demands (both aesthetic and authoritarian), enabled the Thao to simultaneously maintain their ritual ensemble (malhakan) at the heart of their Lus'an ceremonies.

== Official recognition ==
On 15 August 2001, the Executive Yuan (Council) of Taiwan officially recognized the Thao as the tenth ethnic group among Taiwan's Indigenous peoples. The Thao have been mistakenly regarded as the "Tsou" (a separate and different ethnic group of Aboriginals) since the time of Japanese occupation. The error was caused by both a misunderstanding of the legend saying that "the ancestors of Thao were from the mountain Alishan (Mountain A Li)" and the similar pronunciation of ‘Thao’ and ‘Tsou’. Thus, the domain of the Thaos had been registered as "Tsous from the flatlands of the mountains" under the nine ethnic groups of Taiwan’s Indigenous peoples.

== See also ==
- Demographics of Taiwan
- Taiwanese indigenous peoples
