= Xiangshan Visitor Center =

Visitor center in Yuchi, Nantou County, Taiwan

- 向山行政暨遊客中心
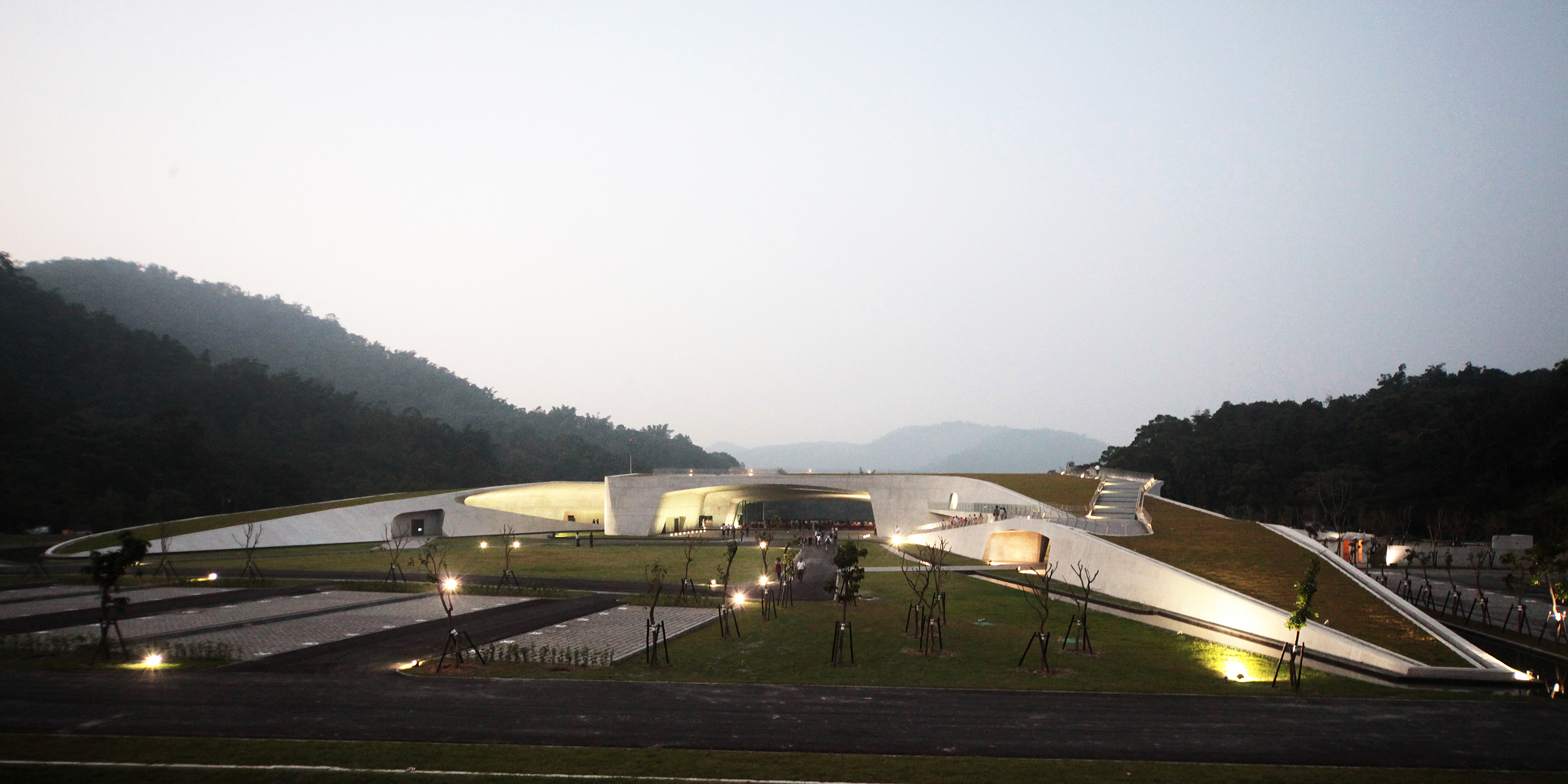
- Interactive map of the Xiangshan Visitor Center area

General information
- Type: visitor center
- Location: Yuchi, Nantou County, Taiwan
- Coordinates: 23°51′4.1″N 120°54′7.6″E
- Opened: 2010

Design and construction
- Architect: Dan Norihiko

The Xiangshan Visitor Center (traditional Chinese: 向山行政暨遊客中心; simplified Chinese: 向山行政暨游客中心; pinyin: Xiàngshān Xíngzhèng Jì Yóukè Zhōngxīn; lit. 'Xiangshan Administrative and Visitor Center') is a visitor center overlooking Sun Moon Lake in Yuchi Township, Nantou County, Taiwan.

== History ==
The center was constructed in 2010.

== Architecture ==
The center was designed by architect Dan Norihiko with a theme of promoting the harmonious integration between human habitation and the natural world. The structure consists of two curved wings with central canopies, the latter each measuring 34 m (112 ft) in length and 8 m (26 ft) in height.

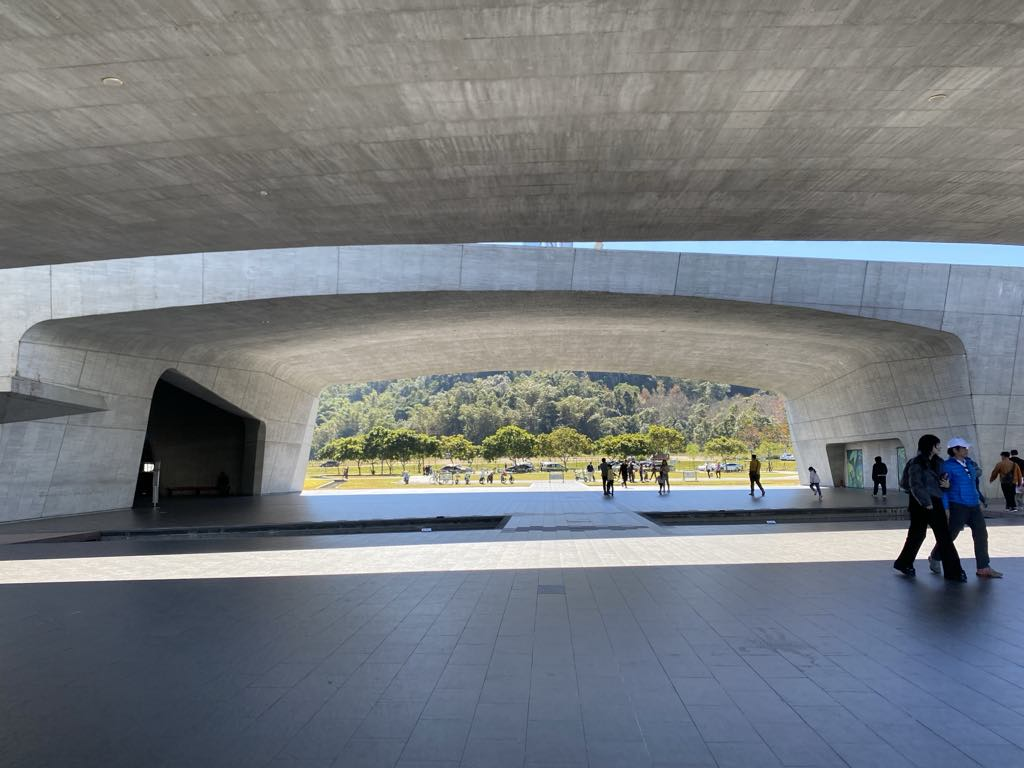
Xiangshang Visitor Center Interior

== See also ==
- List of tourist attractions in Taiwan
