= Sun Moon Lake =

Lake in Yuchi, Nantou County, Taiwan

- Zintun; Lake Candidius
- 日月潭 (Chinese)
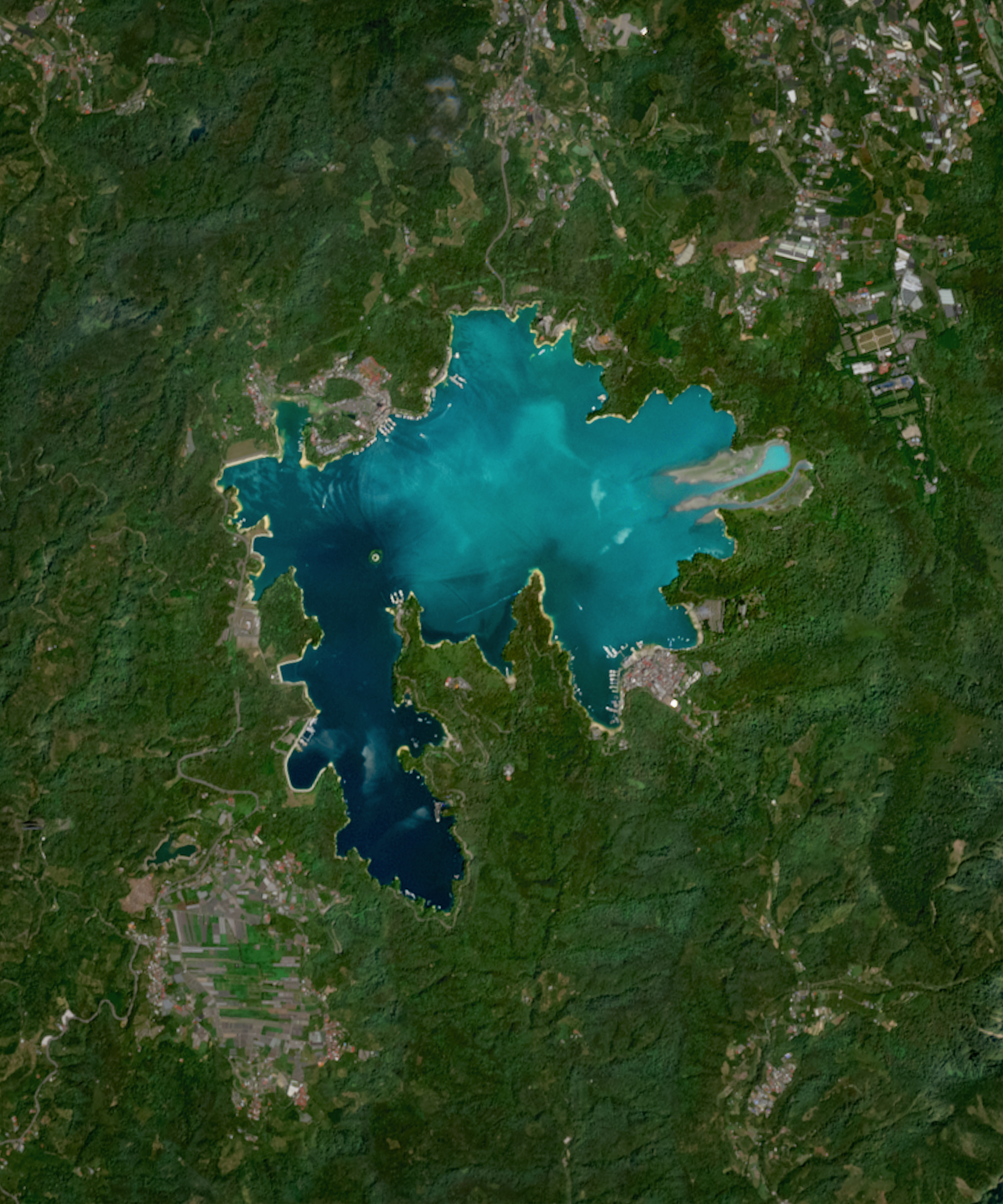
- Sun Moon Lake captured by Sentinel-2 satellite in 2024

- Location within Nantou County
- Location: Yuchi, Nantou County, Taiwan
- Coordinates: 23°52′N 120°55′E
- Type: Lake
- Primary outflows: Shueili River
- Surface area: 7.93 km^{2} (3.06 sq mi)
- Max. depth: 27 m (89 ft)
- Surface elevation: 748 m (2,454 ft)

Sun Moon Lake
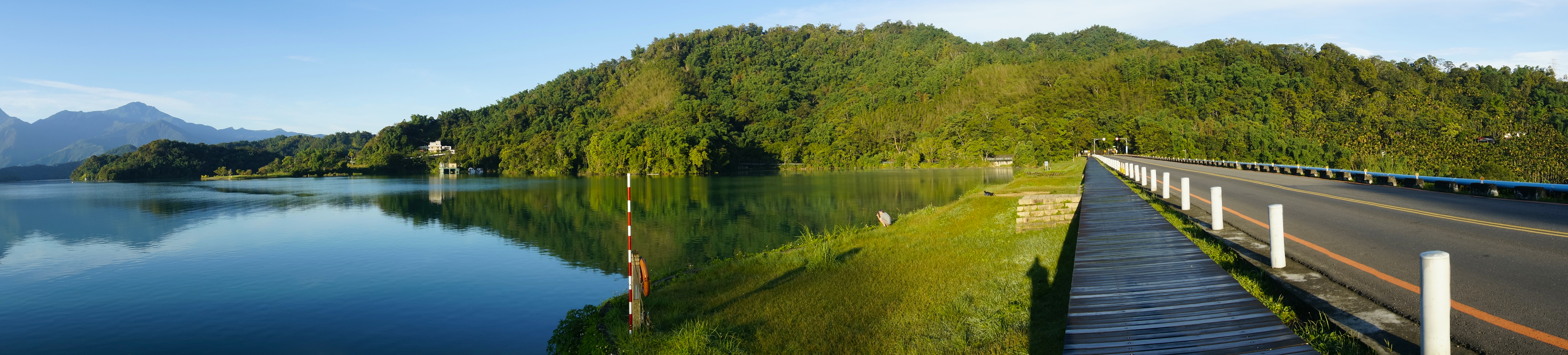
- Interactive map of Sun Moon Lake

Power Station
- Operator: Taiwan Power Company
- Turbines: 5 x 22 MW (30,000 hp) Pelton wheels 6 x 267 MW (358,000 hp) Francis pump-turbines 4 x 250 MW (340,000 hp) Francis pump-turbines
- Installed capacity: 2,712 MW (3,637,000 hp)

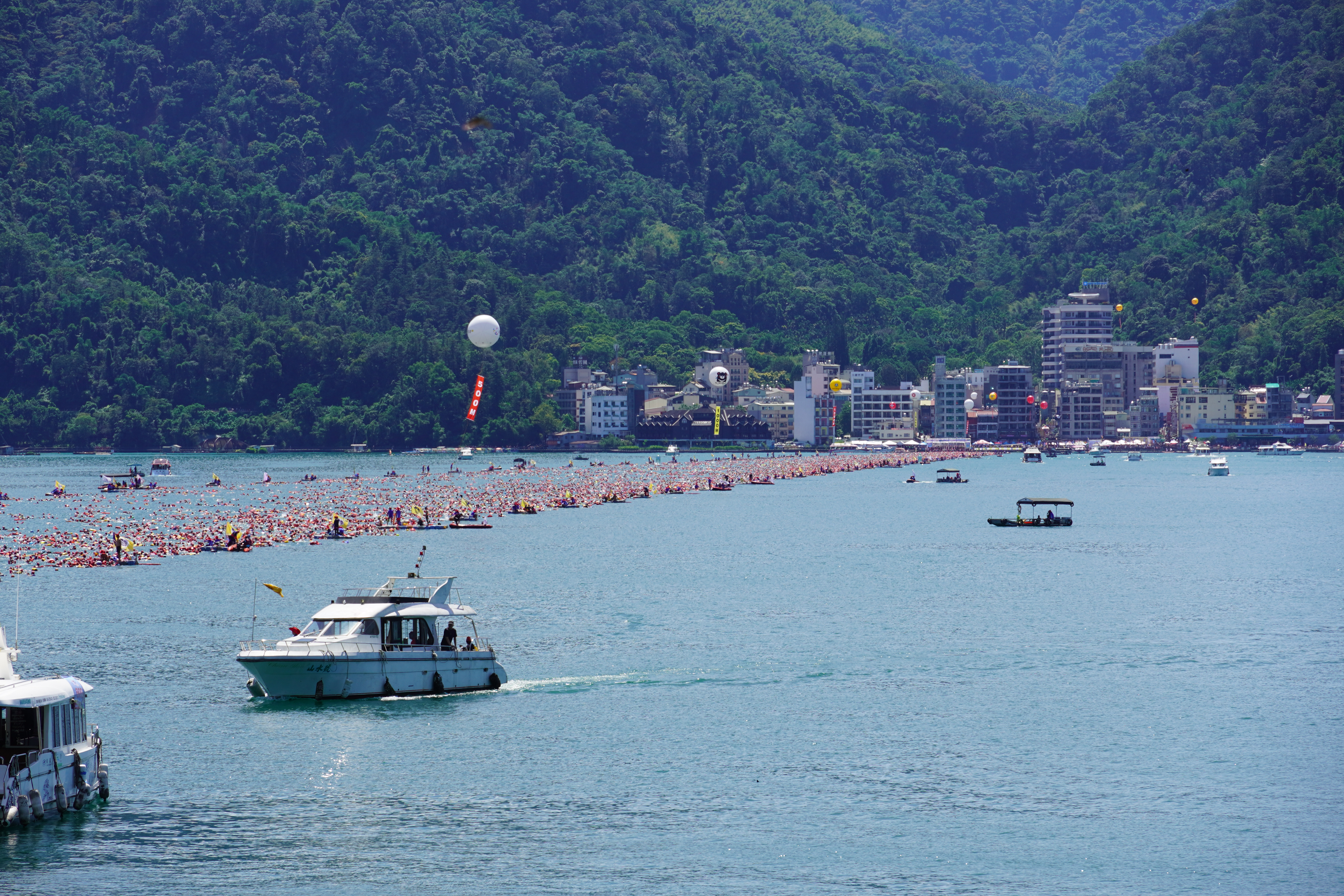
The 2024 Swimming Carnival of Sun Moon Lake

Sun Moon Lake
- "Sun Moon Lake" in Chinese characters
- Chinese: 日月潭
- Literal meaning: "Sun Moon Pool"
Transcriptions
Standard Mandarin
- Hanyu Pinyin: Rìyuè tán
- Wade–Giles: Jih^{4}-yüeh^{4} t'an^{2}
- IPA: [ɻɻ̩̂.ɥê tʰǎn]
Yue: Cantonese
- Yale Romanization: Yaht-yuht tàahm
- Jyutping: Jat6-jyut6 taam4
Southern Min
- Hokkien POJ: Ji̍t-goa̍t-thâm

Sun Moon Lake (Chinese: 日月潭; pinyin: Rìyuè tán; Pe̍h-ōe-jī: Ji̍t-goa̍t-thâm; Thao: Zintun) is a lake in Yuchi Township, Nantou County, Taiwan. It is the largest body of water in Taiwan. The area around the lake is home to the Thao people, one of Taiwan's indigenous ethnic groups. Sun Moon Lake surrounds a tiny island called Lalu. The east side of the lake resembles a sun while the west side resembles a moon, hence the name.

Sun Moon Lake is located 748 m (2,454 ft) above sea level. It is 27 m (89 ft) deep and has a surface area of approximately 7.93 km^{2} (3.06 mi^{2}). The area surrounding the lake has many trails for hiking.

While swimming in Sun Moon Lake is usually not permitted, there is an annual 3-km race called the Swimming Carnival of Sun Moon Lake held around the Mid-Autumn Festival each year. The Sun Moon Lake Swimming Carnival was launched in 1983 and is listed among the Top 50 Open Water Swims in Asia and the Top 100 Open Water Swims of the World. Everyone over 10 years old and with the ability to swim long distances can join, regardless of nationality. In recent years, the participants have numbered in the tens of thousands. Other festivities held at the same time include fireworks, laser shows, and concerts.

The lake and its surrounding countryside have been designated one of thirteen national scenic areas in Taiwan. Wen Wu Temple was built after rising water levels from building a dam forced several smaller temples to be removed. Tzu-En Pagoda (慈恩塔; Cí'ēn Tǎ) was ordered constructed by late President Chiang Kai-shek in 1971 in memory of his mother. Other temples of note include Jianjing Temple, Syuentzang Temple (玄奘寺; Xuánzàng Sì) and Syuanguang Temple (玄光寺; Xuánguāng Sì).

== History ==
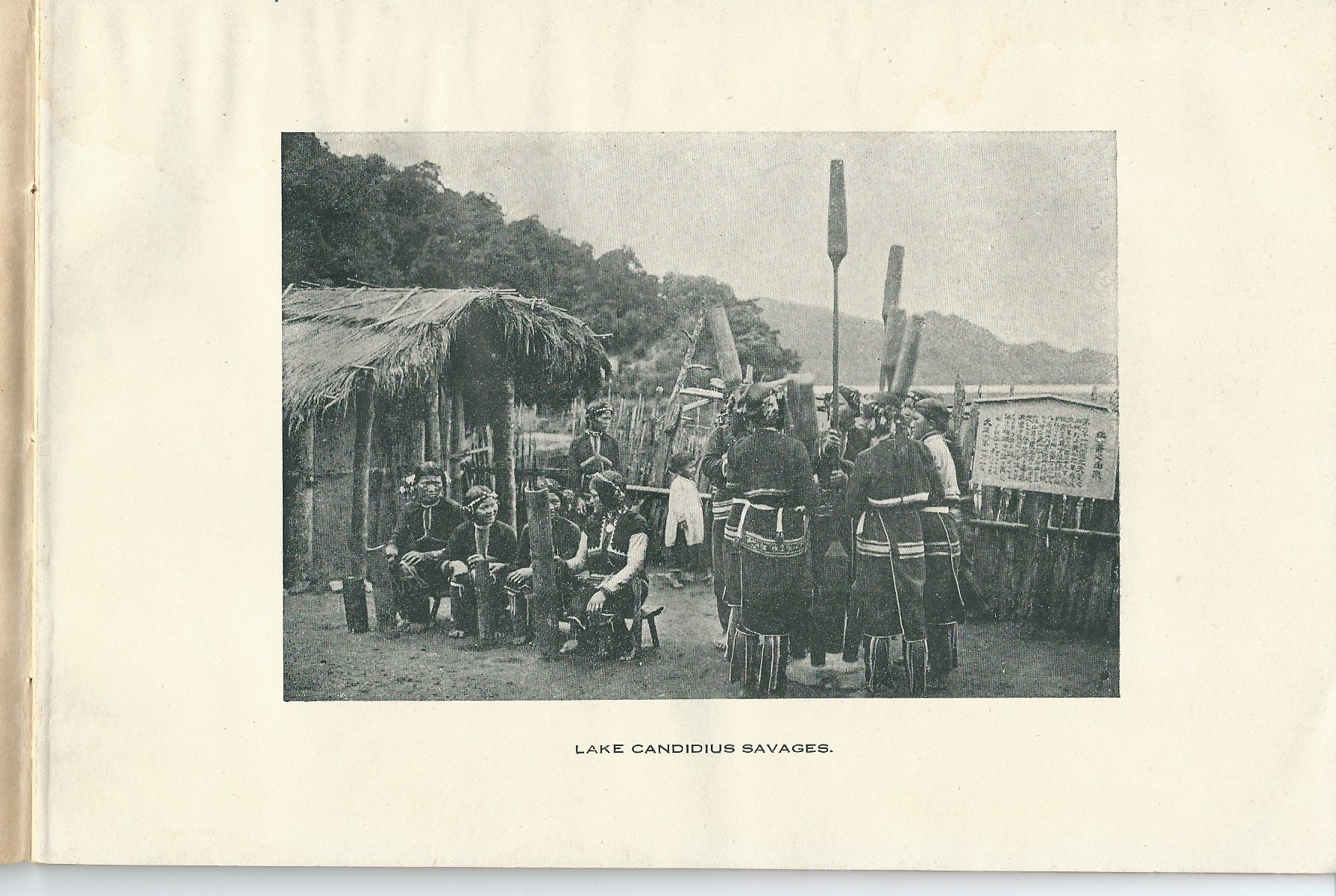
Taiwanese aborigines at Sun Moon Lake, photo from a 1926 brochure of the Government of Formosa

In older English literature, it was commonly referred to as Lake Candidius after the 17th-century Dutch missionary Georgius Candidius. In the middle of the lake is the Lalu Island, which is considered holy ground by the Thao tribe. In legend, Thao hunters discovered Sun Moon Lake while chasing a white deer through the surrounding mountains. The deer eventually led them to the lake, which they found to be not only beautiful, but abundant with fish. Today, the white deer of legends is immortalized as a marble statue on Lalu Island.

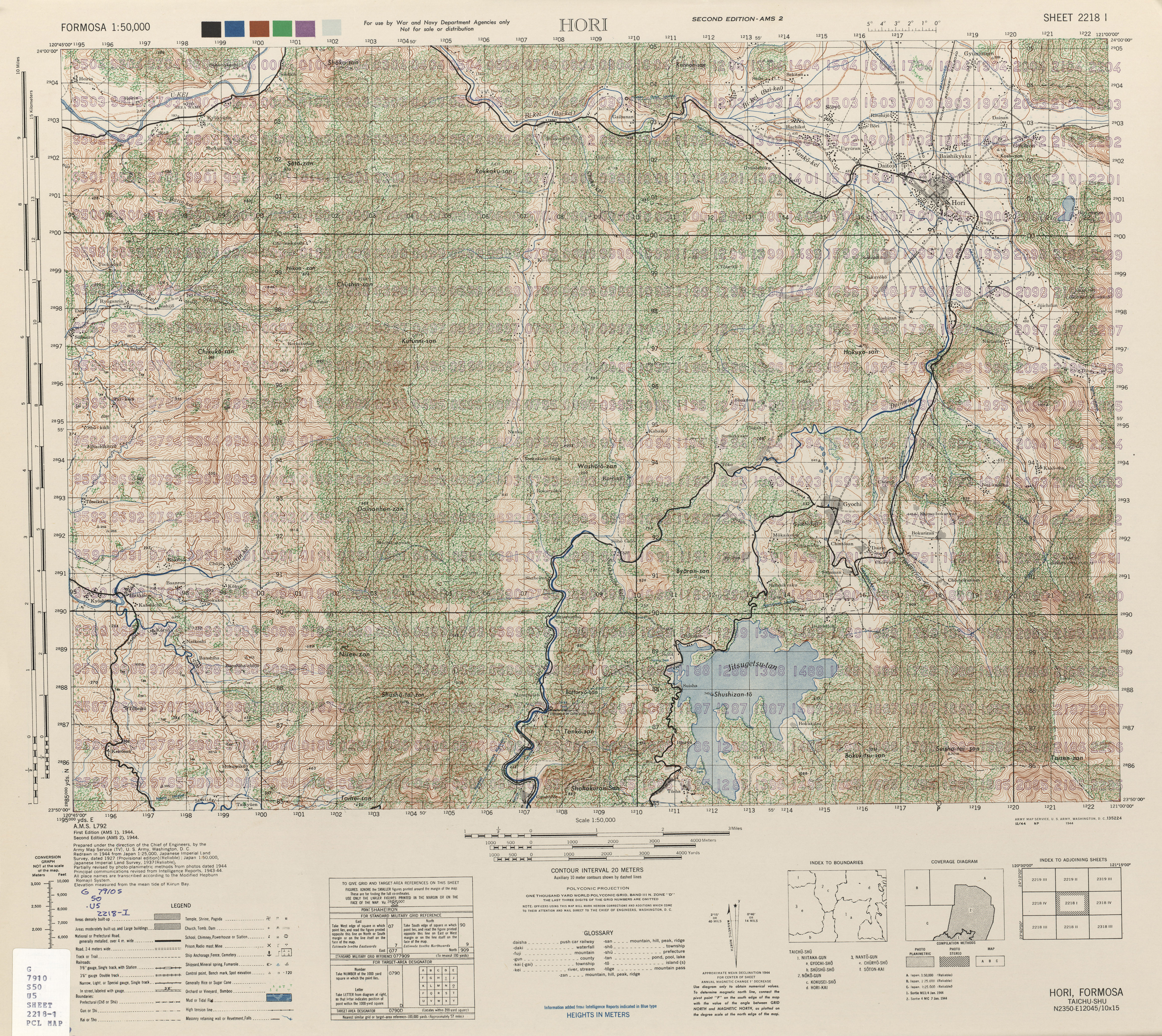
Map including Sun Moon Lake (labeled as Jitsugetsu-tan) (1944)

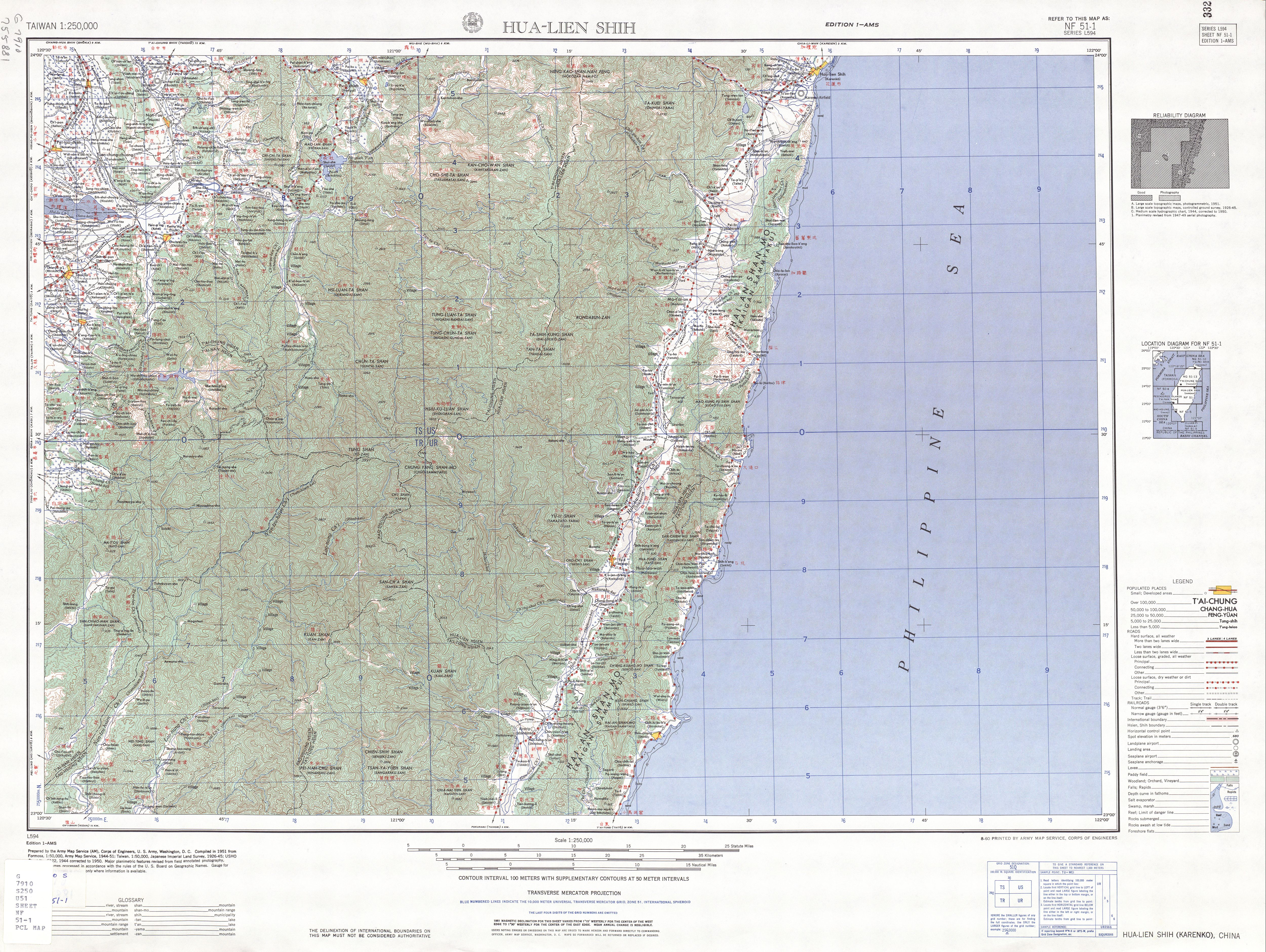
Map including Sun Moon Lake (labeled as Jih-yüeh T'an (Jitsugetsu-tan) 日月潭) (1951)

Under Japanese rule, the island was renamed "Jade Island" (Japanese: 玉島). After Chiang Kai-shek's Nationalist Government moved to Taiwan, the island was renamed Kwanghwa Island (Chinese: 光華島; lit. 'glorious China island') and in 1978 the local government built a pavilion where annual weddings took place. In 1999, the 921 earthquake destroyed the pavilion and sank most of the island. In recent years, due to increasing social and political awareness, more deference and recognition are being given to Taiwanese aborigines. As a result, after the 921 earthquake, the island was renamed in the Thao language as "Lalu".

The Moon lake was dammed in 1919 by the Tosha Dam at the southern end of the original 'crescent' shape lake.

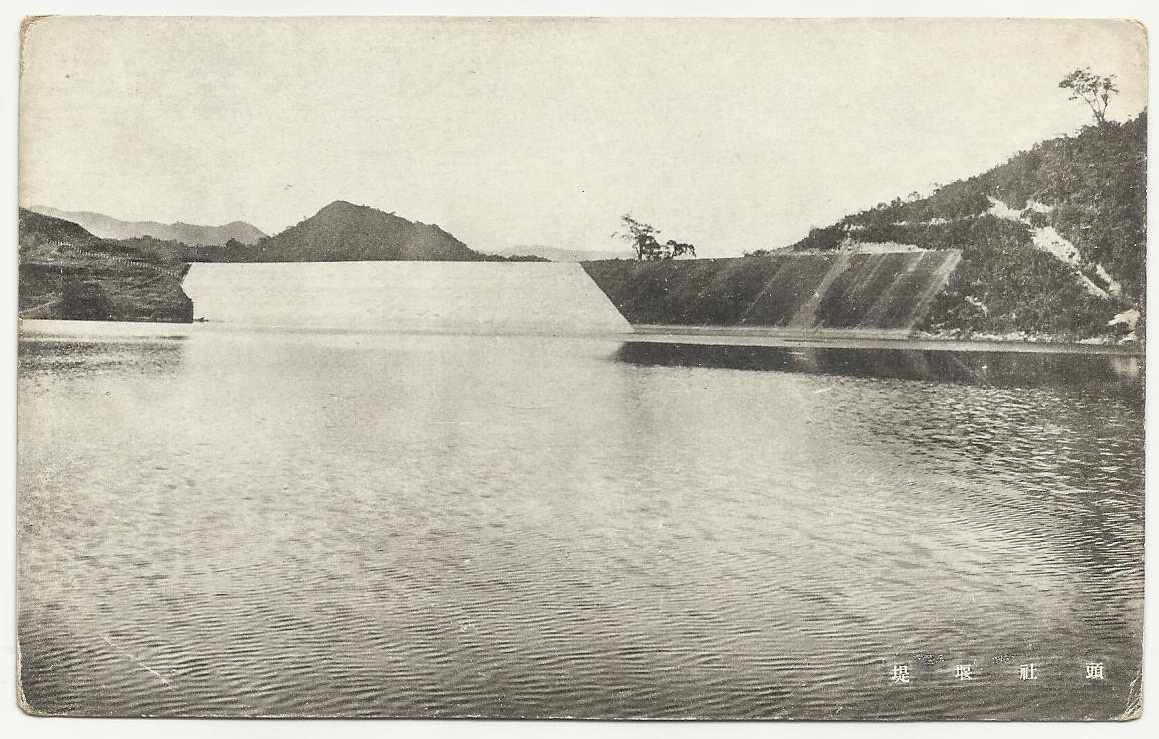
Postcard Tosha Dam Moon Lake (1930s)

== Power Plants ==
Several hydroelectric power plants have been built in the Sun Moon Lake since 1919, including Mingtan Pumped Storage Hydro Power Plant and Minhu Pumped Storage Hydro Power Station. When the first hydroelectric plant was finished in 1934, it was considered to be one of the most important infrastructure constructions of the time. Wujie Dam, also completed in 1934, diverts water from the Zhuoshui River to increase hydroelectric generation at the lake. The Jiji Line railroad was built to facilitate the construction.

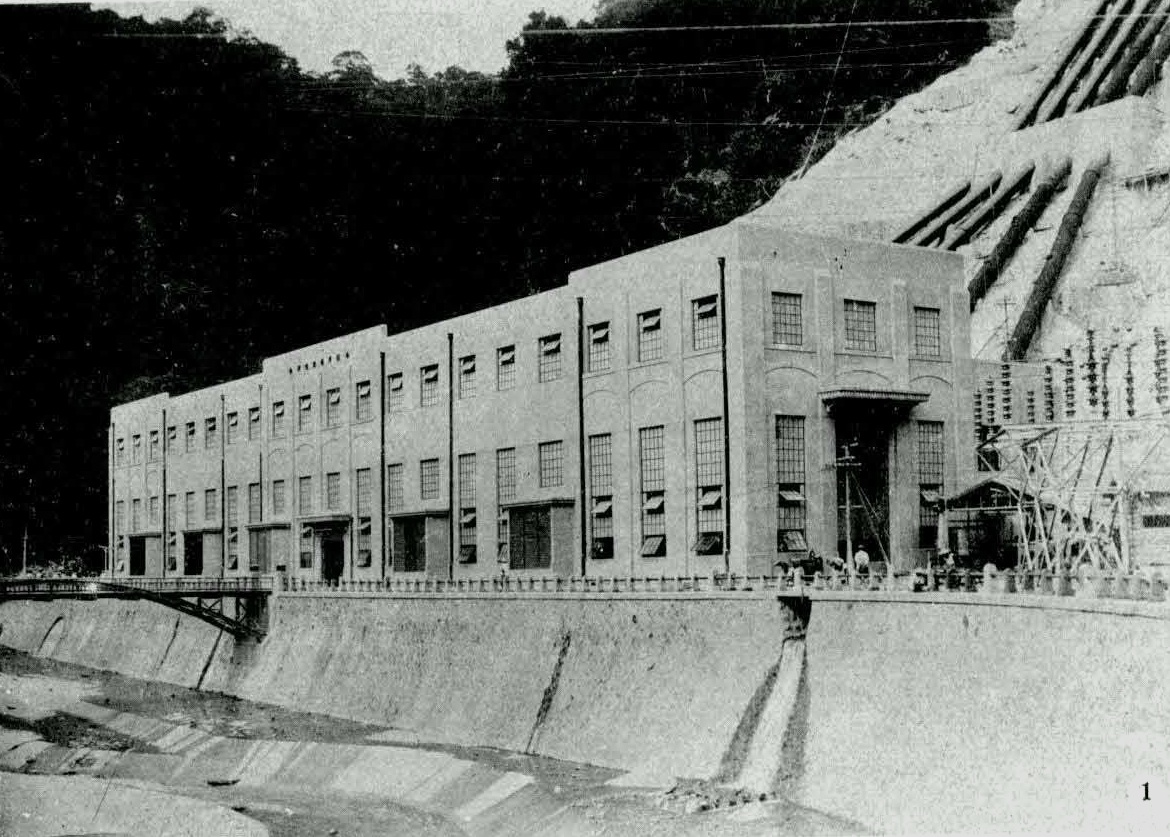
Sun Moon Lake's first power station, opened in 1934

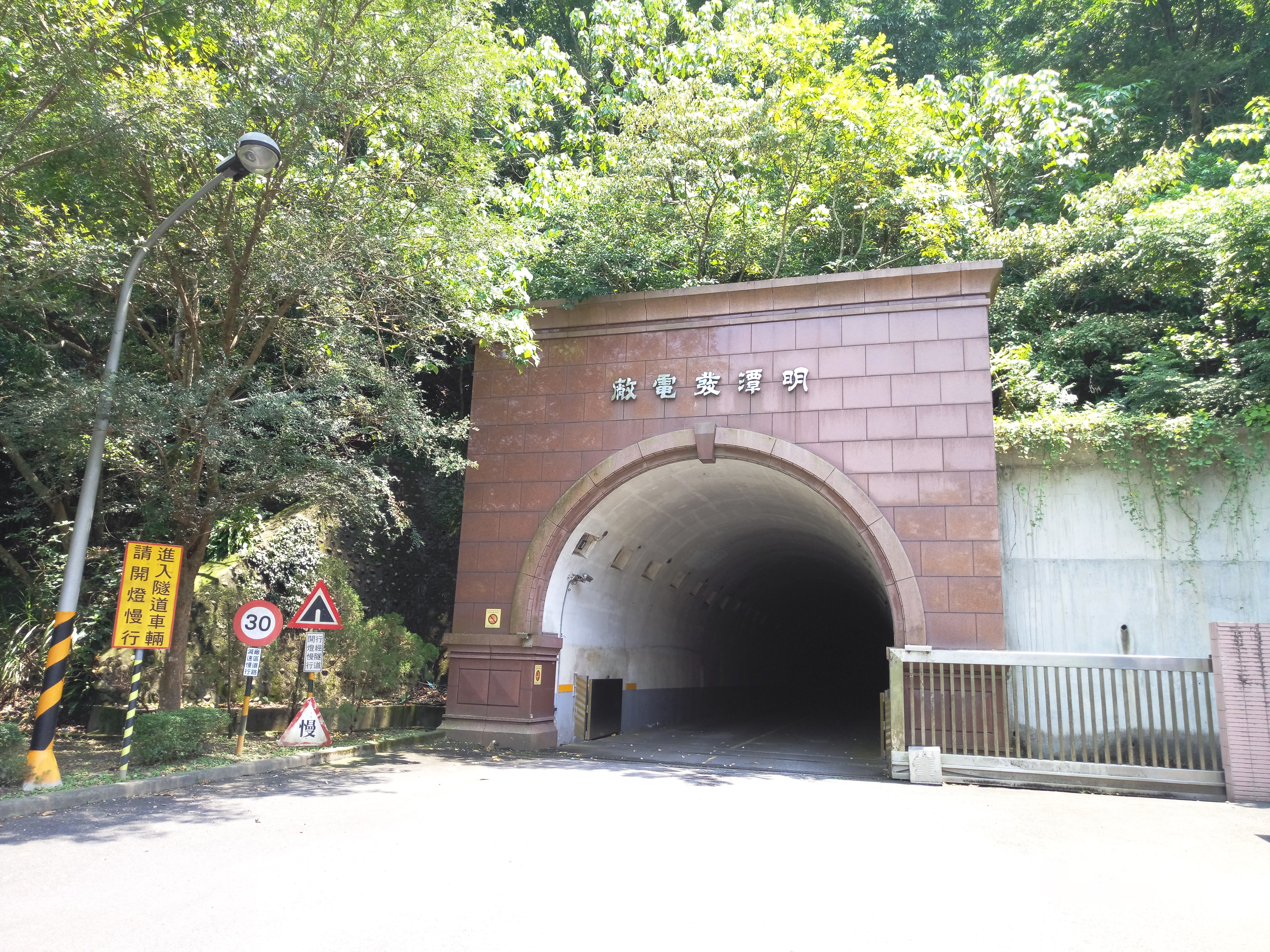
Mingtan Pumped Storage Power Station underground powerhouse entrance tunnel

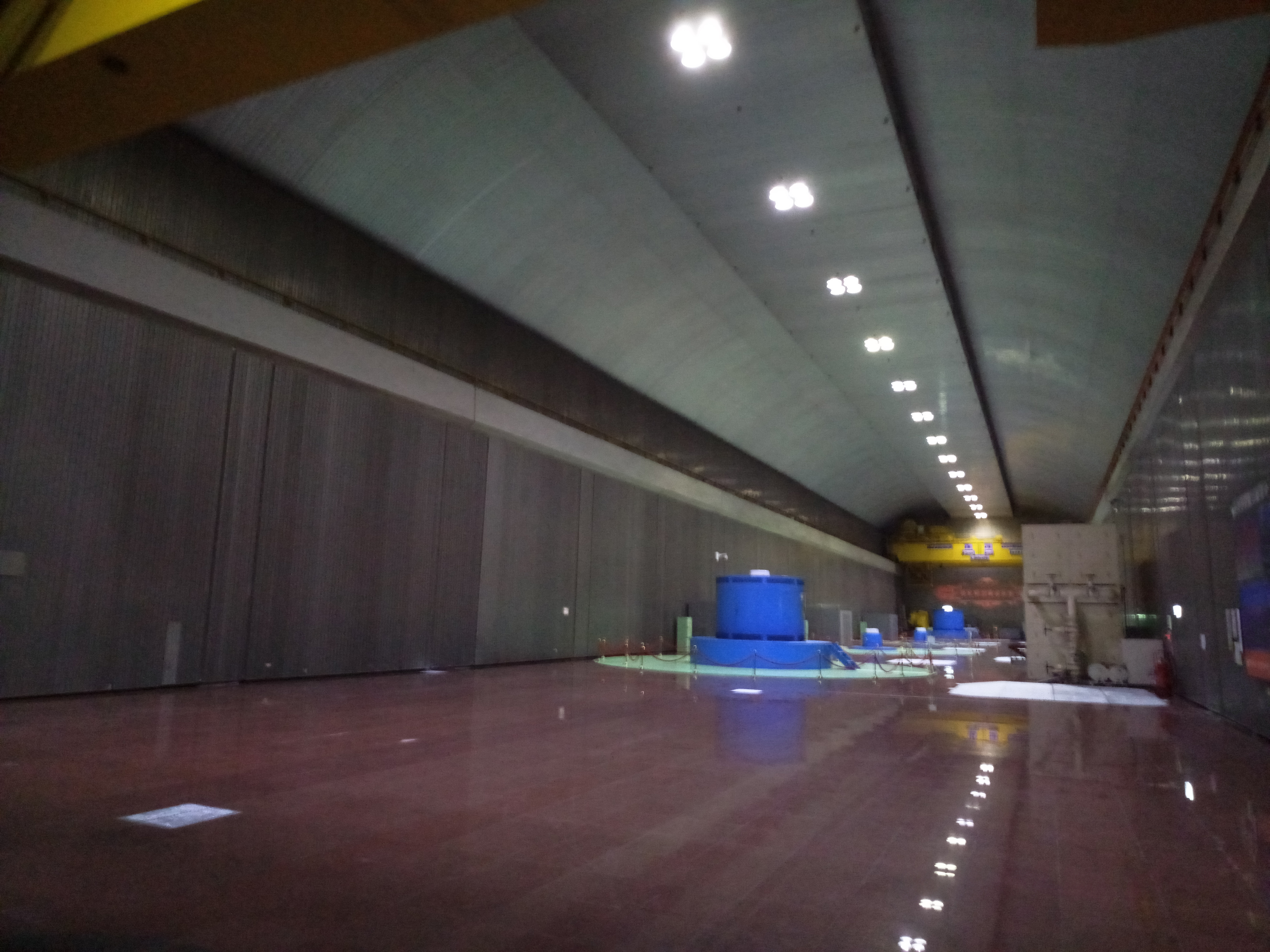
Minhu Pumped Storage Hydro Power Station

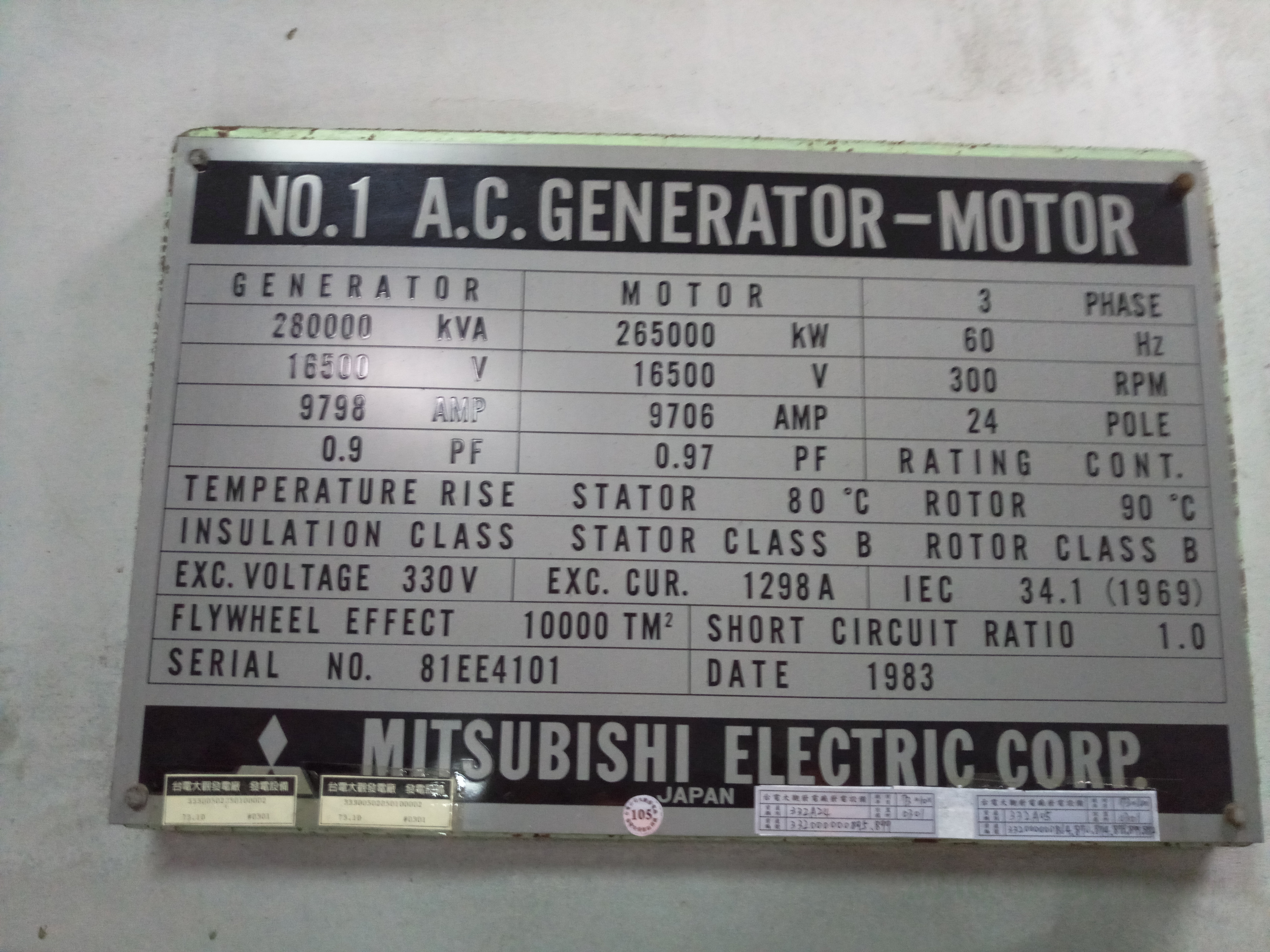
Nameplate of generator No. 1 of Minhu Pumped Storage Power Station

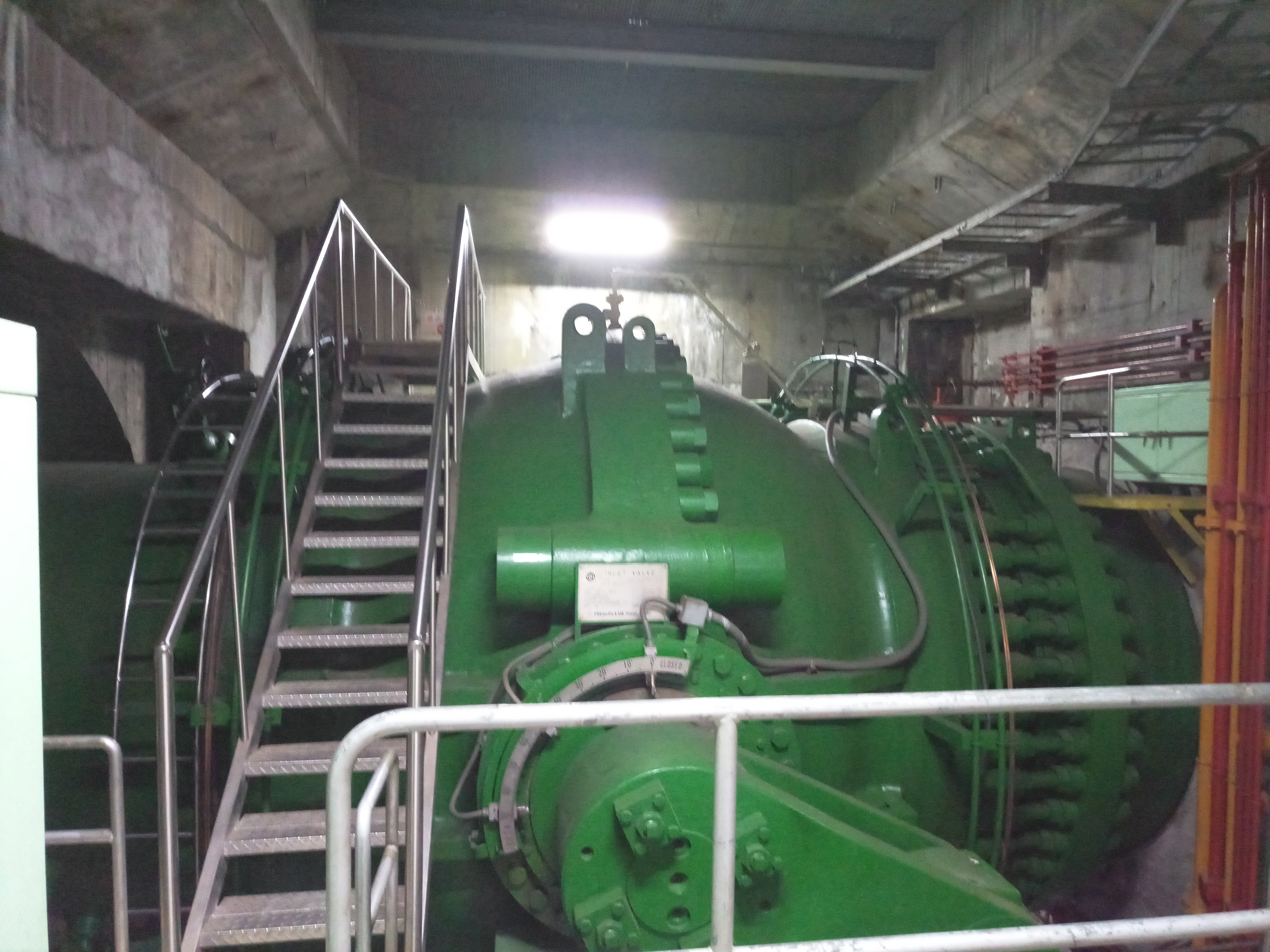
Water turbine No.2

== Transportation ==
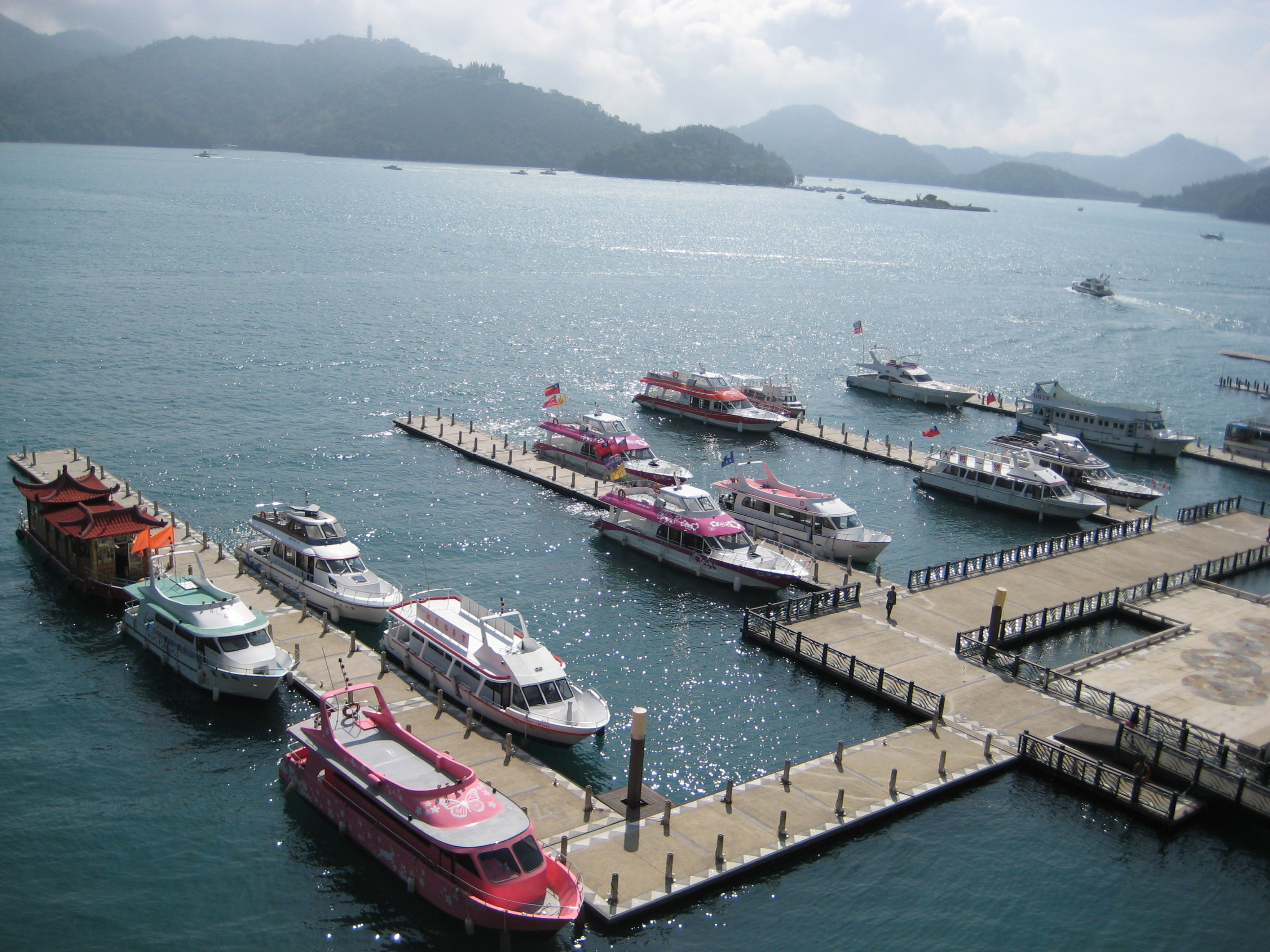
Shuishe Pier

There are three ferry piers on the lake to serve ferries on the lake; they are Shuishe Pier, Xuanguang Pier and Ita Thao Pier. There is also a local bus service that goes around the lake with stops at major points along the perimeter of the lake.

The lake is accessible by bus from Taichung HSR station or Taichung TRA station. It is also accessible by bus from near Checheng railway station on the Jiji branch line.

The Sun Moon Lake Ropeway, located at the edge of the lake, connects it with the Formosan Aboriginal Culture Village.

== Tourism ==
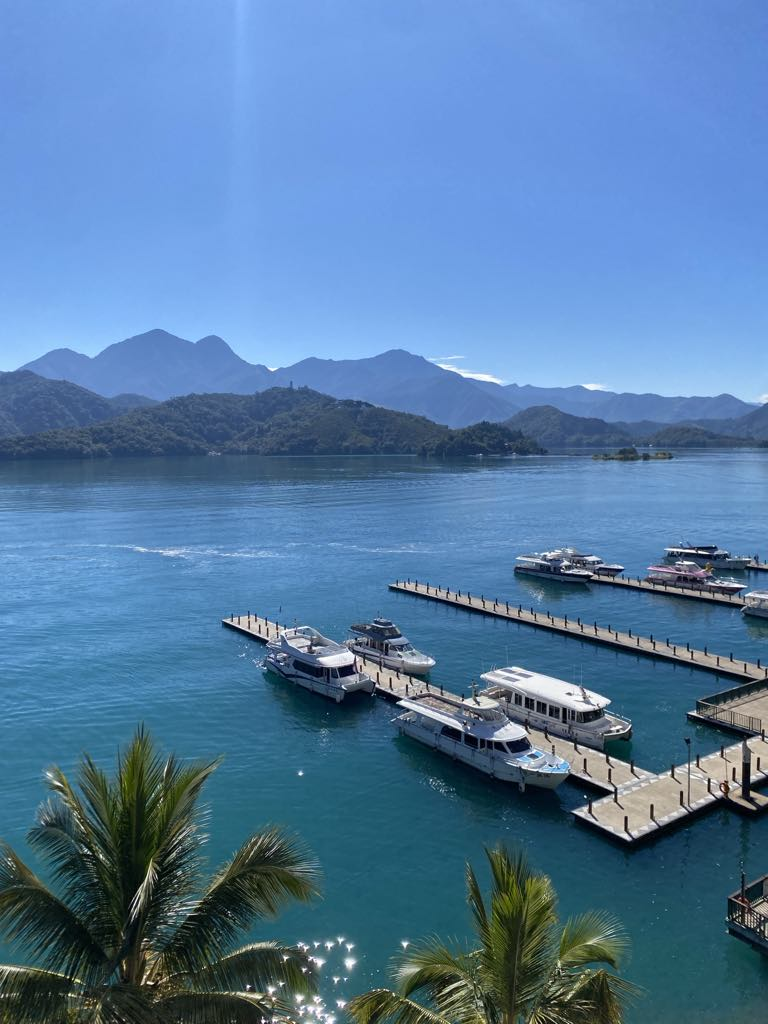
Sun Moon Lake (Jan 14, 2025)

The lake is a popular tourist destination for visitors in Taiwan. In 2020, the number of annual tourist visits was 4.65 million people which then dropped to 3.03 million in 2021 due to the COVID-19 pandemic. In 2023, the number of tourists increased to 5.3 million.

Surrounding the lake are biking and hiking trails for visitors. The Xiangshan Visitor Center is located adjacent to the lake, allowing visitors an upward view of the water.

== Wildlife ==
The lake is a productive aquatic ecosystem. Introduced giant snakehead pose a challenge to the ecological balance of the lake and are a threat to native fish and shrimp species. The Nantou County Bureau of Agricultural Affairs has in place an eradication program for the species which attempts to electrofish schools of juvenile fish.

== PRC passport ==
The depiction of Sun Moon Lake is featured in the newly-issued People's Republic of China passport in 2012, a move that has triggered protest from Taipei to Beijing.

== Climate ==
Climate data for Sun Moon Lake, elevation 1,015 m (3,330 ft), (1991–2020 normals, extremes 1941–present）
Month	Jan	Feb	Mar	Apr	May	Jun	Jul	Aug	Sep	Oct	Nov	Dec	Year
Record high °C (°F)	29.2 (84.6)	30.0 (86.0)	31.2 (88.2)	32.8 (91.0)	32.8 (91.0)	33.3 (91.9)	34.0 (93.2)	33.5 (92.3)	33.3 (91.9)	32.5 (90.5)	30.7 (87.3)	29.4 (84.9)	34.0 (93.2)
Mean daily maximum °C (°F)	19.4 (66.9)	20.3 (68.5)	22.1 (71.8)	24.2 (75.6)	26.0 (78.8)	27.2 (81.0)	28.3 (82.9)	27.8 (82.0)	27.2 (81.0)	25.6 (78.1)	23.6 (74.5)	20.5 (68.9)	24.3 (75.8)
Daily mean °C (°F)	14.4 (57.9)	15.2 (59.4)	16.9 (62.4)	19.2 (66.6)	21.1 (70.0)	22.3 (72.1)	22.9 (73.2)	22.7 (72.9)	22.2 (72.0)	20.6 (69.1)	18.6 (65.5)	15.6 (60.1)	19.3 (66.8)
Mean daily minimum °C (°F)	11.3 (52.3)	12.1 (53.8)	13.9 (57.0)	16.3 (61.3)	18.5 (65.3)	19.7 (67.5)	20.1 (68.2)	20.0 (68.0)	19.5 (67.1)	17.9 (64.2)	15.7 (60.3)	12.7 (54.9)	16.5 (61.7)
Record low °C (°F)	−0.3 (31.5)	−0.1 (31.8)	1.0 (33.8)	6.3 (43.3)	12.4 (54.3)	13.9 (57.0)	16.2 (61.2)	15.8 (60.4)	12.9 (55.2)	11.2 (52.2)	5.9 (42.6)	1.5 (34.7)	−0.3 (31.5)
Average precipitation mm (inches)	56.7 (2.23)	72.0 (2.83)	103.1 (4.06)	174.6 (6.87)	354.6 (13.96)	441.6 (17.39)	394.5 (15.53)	422.9 (16.65)	192.1 (7.56)	50.3 (1.98)	38.4 (1.51)	42.2 (1.66)	2,343 (92.23)
Average precipitation days (≥ 0.1 mm)	7.9	8.2	10.6	13.4	18.3	20.0	18.3	19.0	12.0	5.9	5.3	6.4	145.3
Average relative humidity (%)	76.9	78.4	80.4	82.3	84.4	85.1	84.5	85.5	84.1	81.9	79.2	77.3	81.7
Mean monthly sunshine hours	159.4	136.9	128.5	109.5	109.2	111.3	140.6	125.2	123.6	147.6	160.2	157.0	1,609
Source: Central Weather Bureau

Climate data for Sun Moon Lake (Maolan Mountain Tea Research and Extension Station), elevation 850 m (2,790 ft), (2016–2023, extremes 1995–present）
Month	Jan	Feb	Mar	Apr	May	Jun	Jul	Aug	Sep	Oct	Nov	Dec	Year
Record high °C (°F)	27.6 (81.7)	30.8 (87.4)	32.5 (90.5)	30.8 (87.4)	32.2 (90.0)	33.8 (92.8)	34.2 (93.6)	32.8 (91.0)	33.4 (92.1)	33.1 (91.6)	30.4 (86.7)	29.5 (85.1)	34.2 (93.6)
Mean daily maximum °C (°F)	20.5 (68.9)	21.1 (70.0)	22.9 (73.2)	24.8 (76.6)	26.7 (80.1)	27.6 (81.7)	28.6 (83.5)	28.1 (82.6)	28.0 (82.4)	26.7 (80.1)	25.2 (77.4)	22.0 (71.6)	25.2 (77.3)
Daily mean °C (°F)	15.0 (59.0)	15.5 (59.9)	17.4 (63.3)	19.6 (67.3)	21.8 (71.2)	22.8 (73.0)	23.4 (74.1)	23.2 (73.8)	22.9 (73.2)	21.6 (70.9)	19.6 (67.3)	16.4 (61.5)	19.9 (67.9)
Mean daily minimum °C (°F)	11.6 (52.9)	12.0 (53.6)	13.9 (57.0)	16.2 (61.2)	18.8 (65.8)	19.8 (67.6)	20.2 (68.4)	20.2 (68.4)	19.8 (67.6)	18.5 (65.3)	16.3 (61.3)	13.2 (55.8)	16.7 (62.1)
Record low °C (°F)	1.1 (34.0)	3.8 (38.8)	2.9 (37.2)	7.5 (45.5)	14.7 (58.5)	17.2 (63.0)	17.9 (64.2)	18.0 (64.4)	15.9 (60.6)	12.5 (54.5)	5.7 (42.3)	2.8 (37.0)	1.1 (34.0)
Average precipitation mm (inches)	39.4 (1.55)	60.8 (2.39)	90.5 (3.56)	159.4 (6.28)	359.0 (14.13)	451.5 (17.78)	415.6 (16.36)	374.8 (14.76)	197.7 (7.78)	48.6 (1.91)	38.1 (1.50)	42.7 (1.68)	2,278.1 (89.68)
Source: Central Weather Administration (precipitation 1995–2023)

== See also ==
- Mingtan Dam
- Xuanzang Temple
- Sun Moon Lake Wen Wu Temple
- List of tourist attractions in Taiwan
