= Xuanzang Temple (Taiwan) =

Temple in Yuchi, Nantou County, Taiwan

Syuentzang Temple
- 玄奘寺
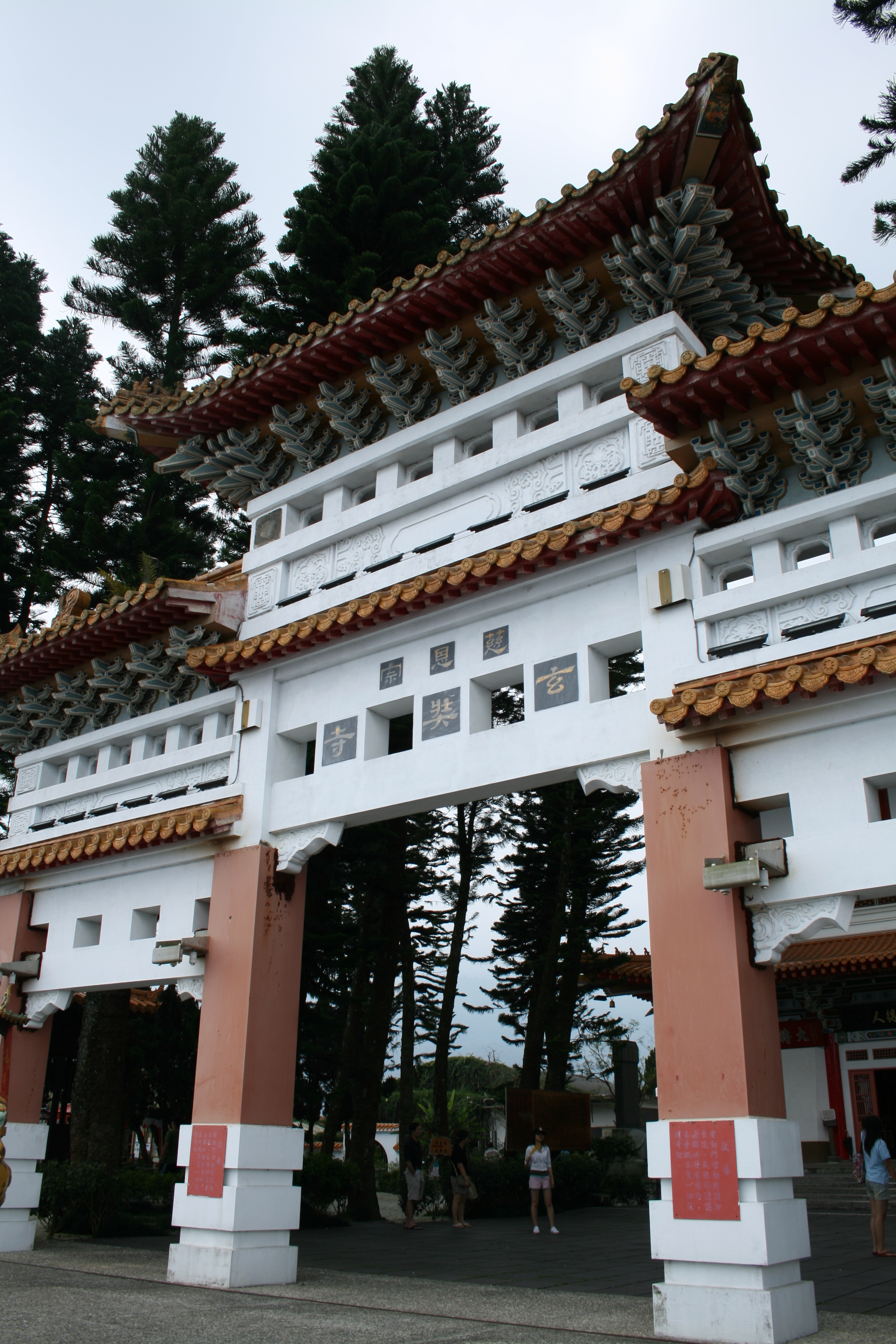

- Location within Nantou County

Religion
- Affiliation: Buddhism
- Deity: Chan Buddhism

Location
- Location: Yuchi, Nantou County, Taiwan
- Interactive map of Syuentzang Temple
- Coordinates: 23°52′N 120°55′E

Architecture
- Type: Temple
- Style: Chinese
- Established: 1965

Xuanzang Temple or Syuentzang Temple (Chinese: 玄奘寺; pinyin: Xuánzàng Sì; Wade–Giles: Hsüan^{2}-tsang^{4}) is a Buddhist temple located in the Sun Moon Lake tourist area, Yuchih Township of Nantou County, Taiwan.

== History ==
Syuentzang Temple was built in 1965 by the Nantou County Government in honor of Hsüan-tsang (also romanized as Syuentzang or Xuanzang) (602–664), a prominent Buddhist monk who made a seventeen-year overland journey to India during the Tang dynasty (618–907) in the seventh century. It sits on a hill named "Cinglong" (靑龍山) near the Sun Moon Lake, the largest body of water in Taiwan.

During the Sino-Japanese War, while the occupying Japanese Imperial Army was digging to establish a Shintoist shrine in Nanjing, unearthed there were the head bones of Xuanzang, which were confirmed by the Chinese and Japanese scholars jointly that had been transferred in 1027 from Changan to this place. For "safety from the deteriorating situation of China", they were moved to Ji-on Temple (慈恩寺), Saitama Prefecture, Japan. In 1955, the Government of Japan returned the Śarīra (Buddhist relics) of Hsüantsang back to the Government of the Republic of China, which itself was "plundered war booty" from Nanjing during the Second Sino-Japanese War. In November 1965, the Śarīra of Hsüantsang was enshrined in Syuentzang Temple.

There stand at Xuanzang Temple three stelae: the central stele about Xuanzang's Journey to the West, the left one dedicated to Sino-Japanese friendship, and the right one commemorating Sino-Japanese Buddhist history.

== Architecture ==
The structure is modeled after ancient halls and rooms of the Tang dynasty (618–907). The Hsüantsang Hall is the main hall of the temple; it has three floors. Under the eaves is a plaque with the Chinese characters "玄奘殿" (Hsüantsang Hall) hanging on the door lintel and a statue of Hsüantsang on his way to seek Buddhist texts. The second floor is the main floor, contains Hsüantsang's shrine, and the third floor has a pagoda named "Hsüantsang Pagoda" that keeps Hsüantsang's Śarīra and many of his classic works.

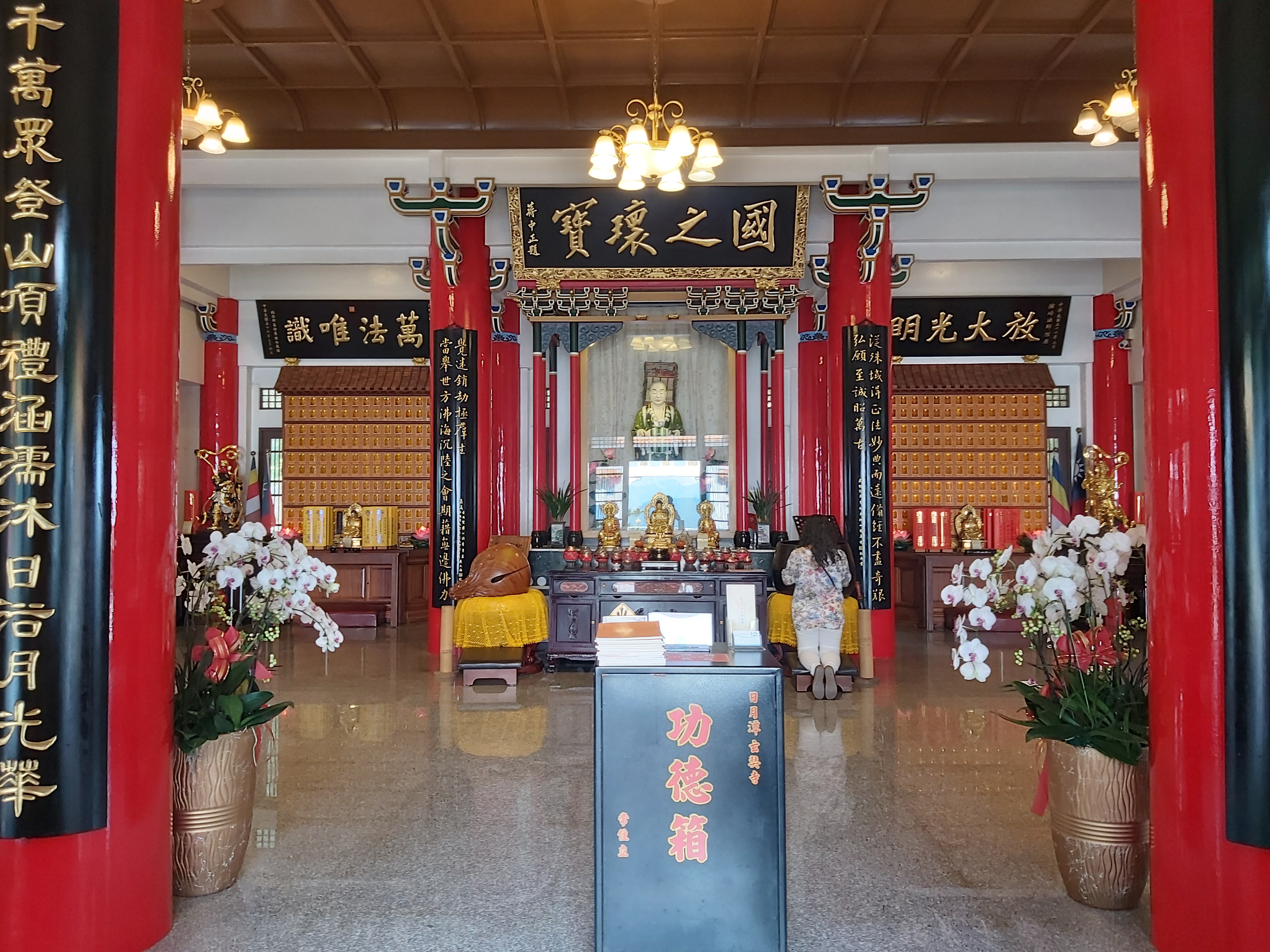
Hsüantsang Hall

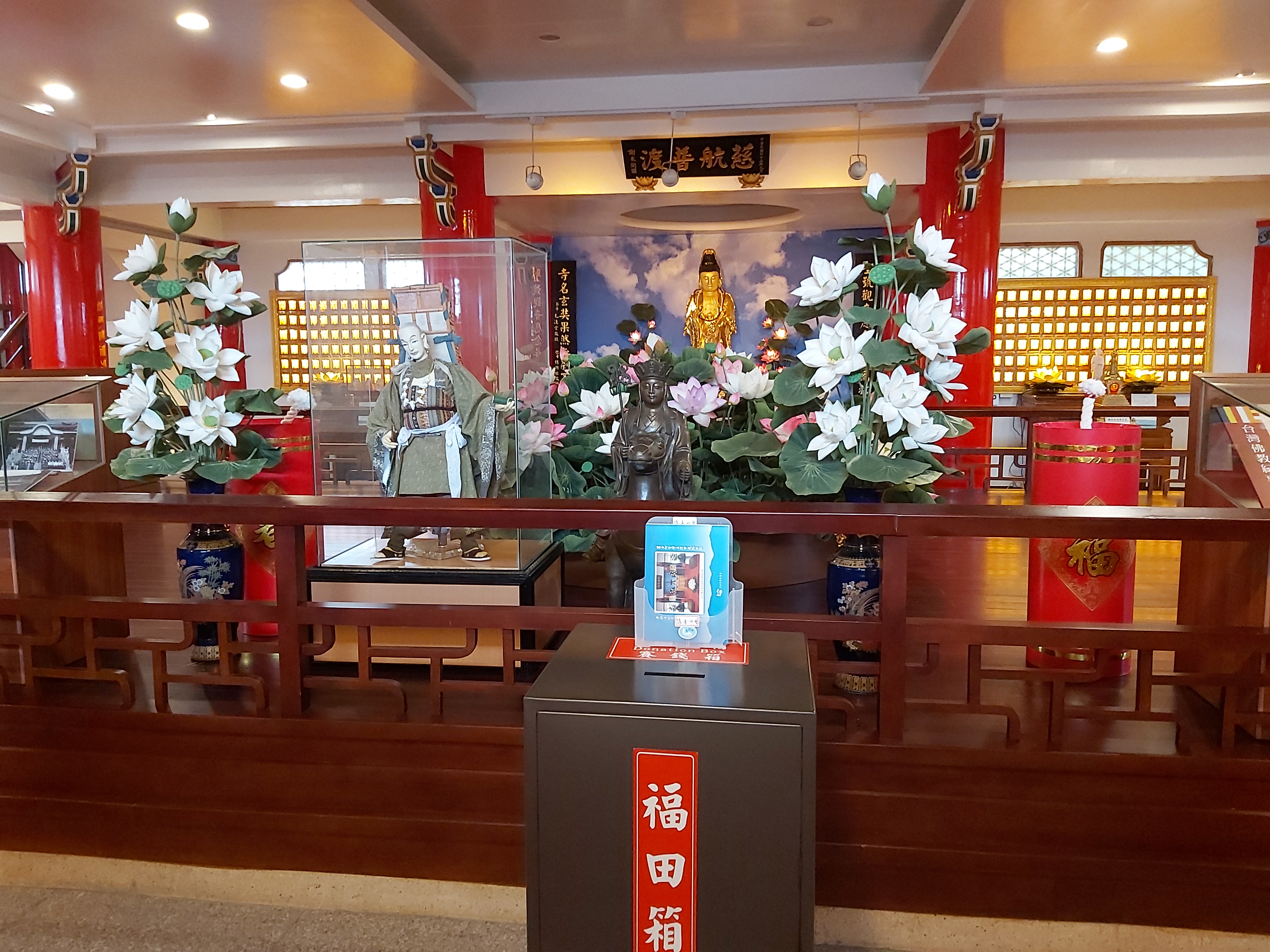
Buddhist shrine

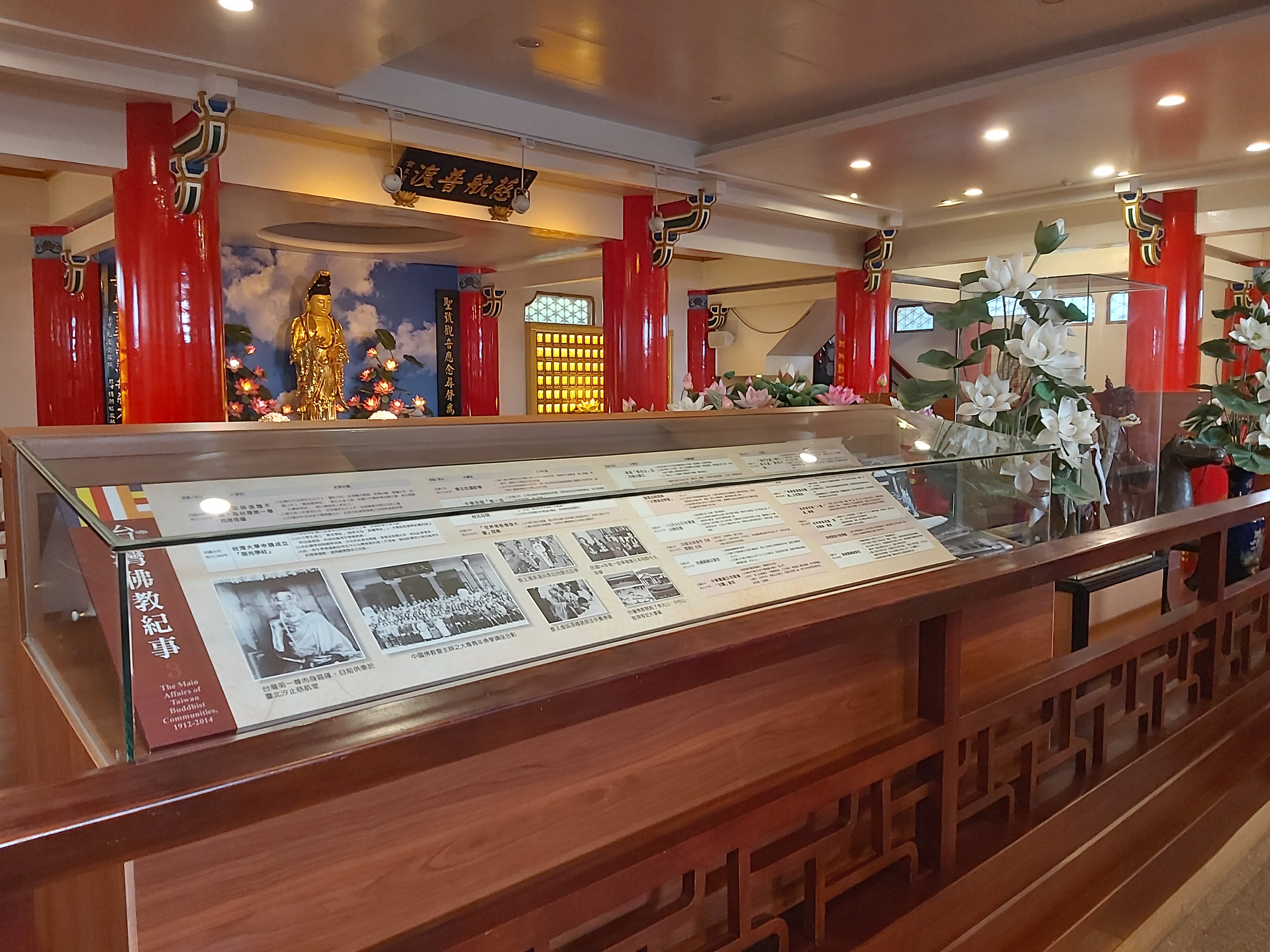
Buddhist shrine

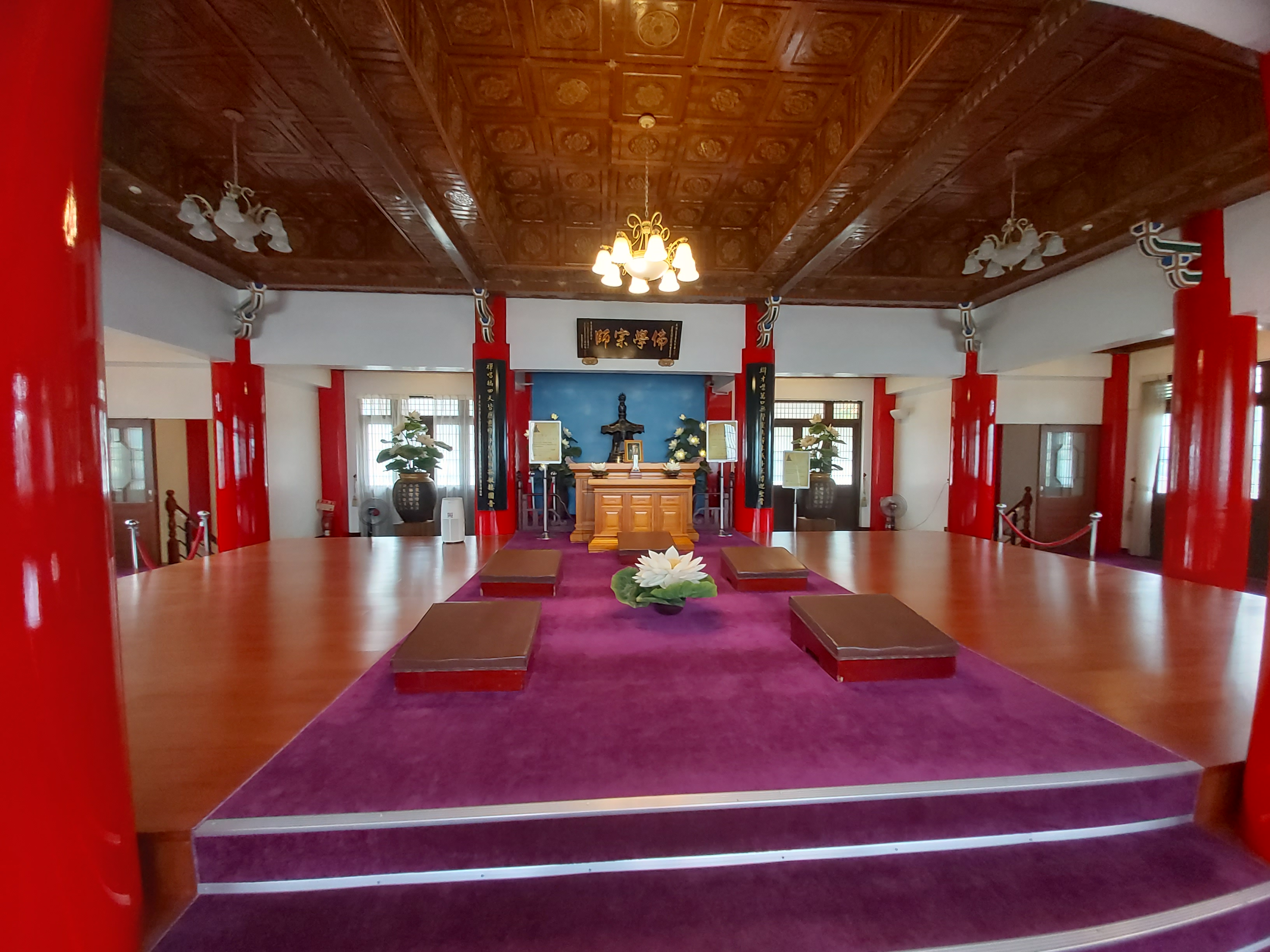
Hsüantsang Pagoda

== Gallery ==
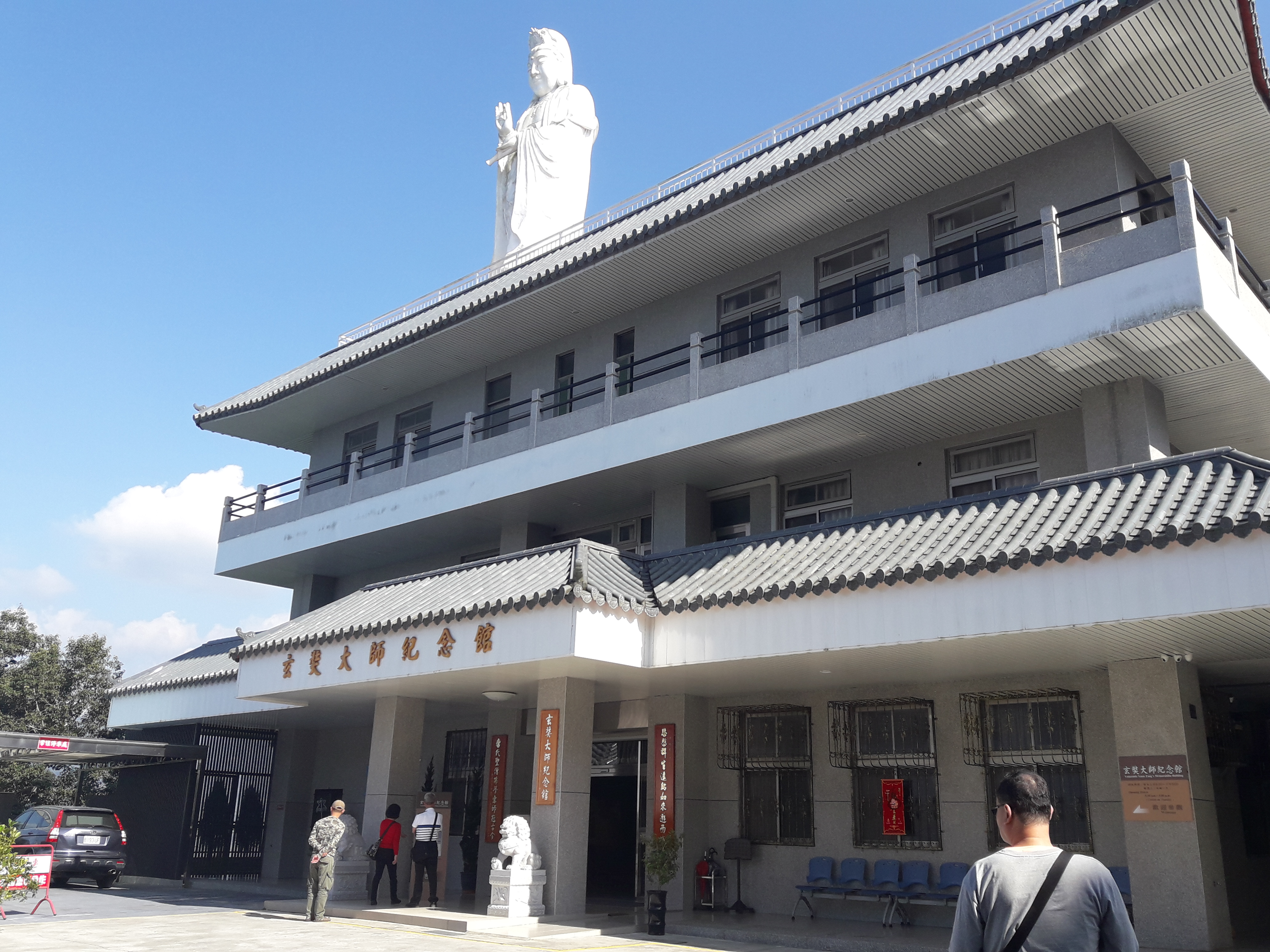
SyuentzangMemorial Museum at Syuentzang Temple.

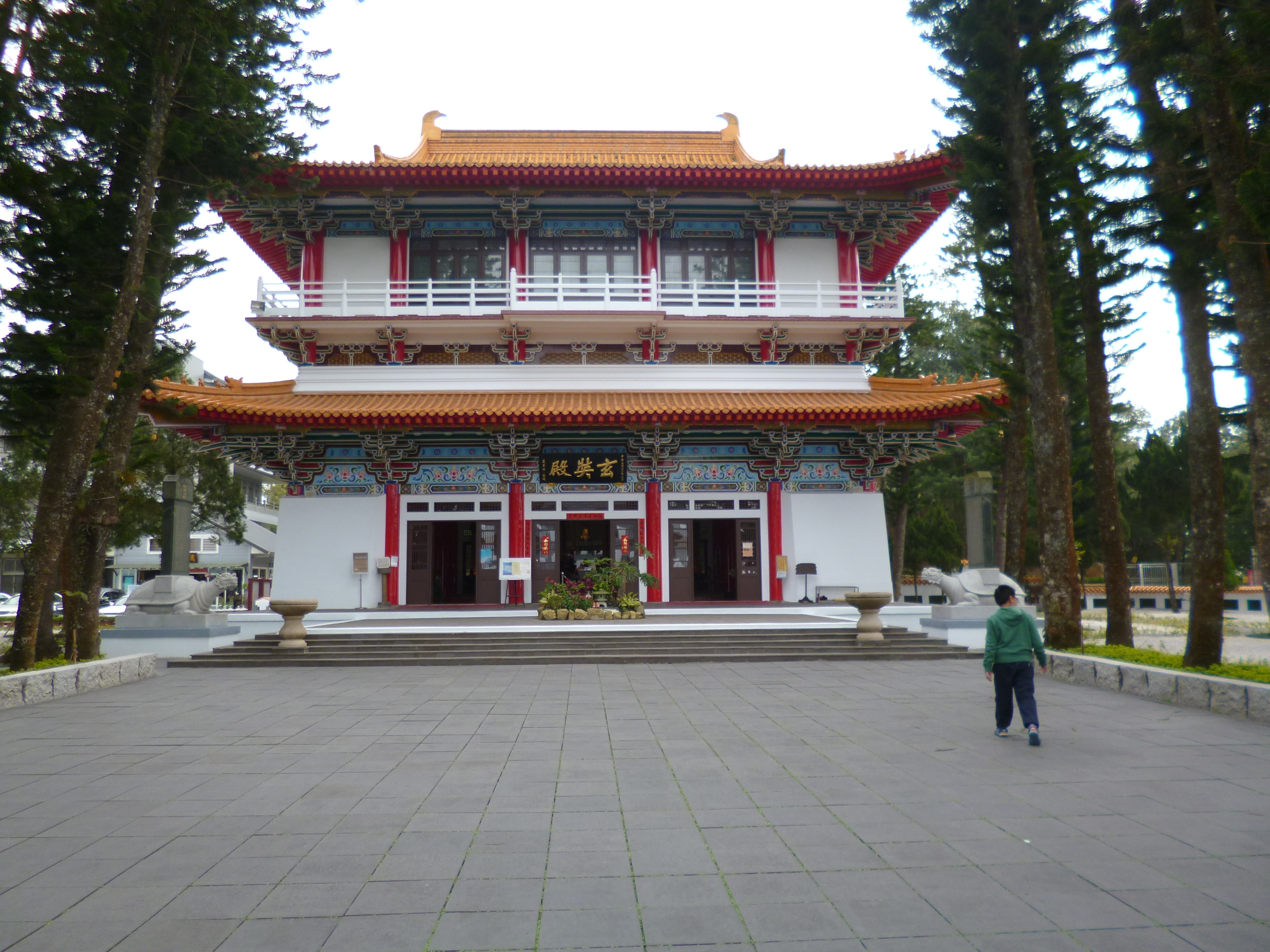
Hsüantsang Hall at Syuentzang Temple.

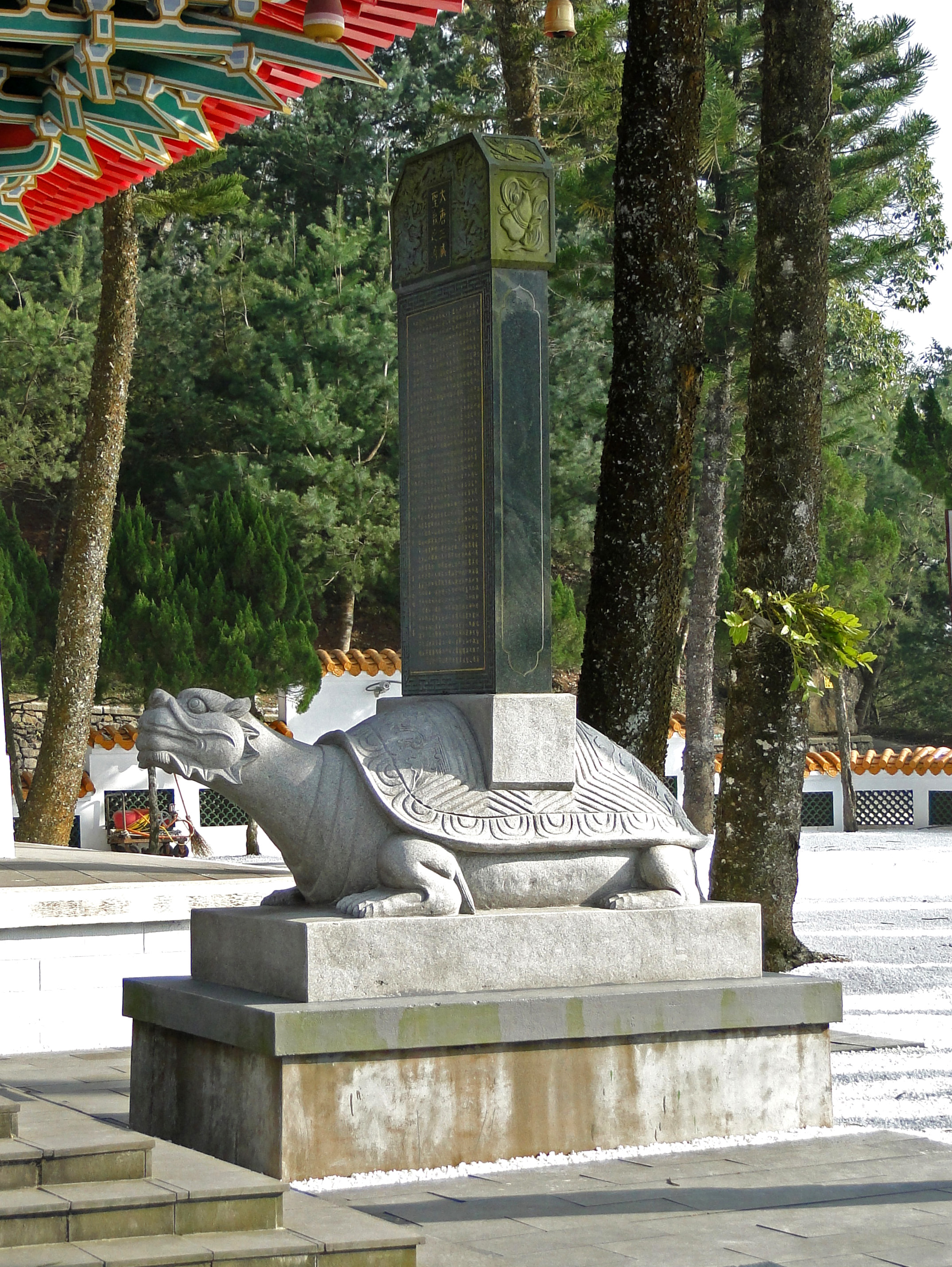
The Pi-hsi to the right of the Syuentzang Temple.

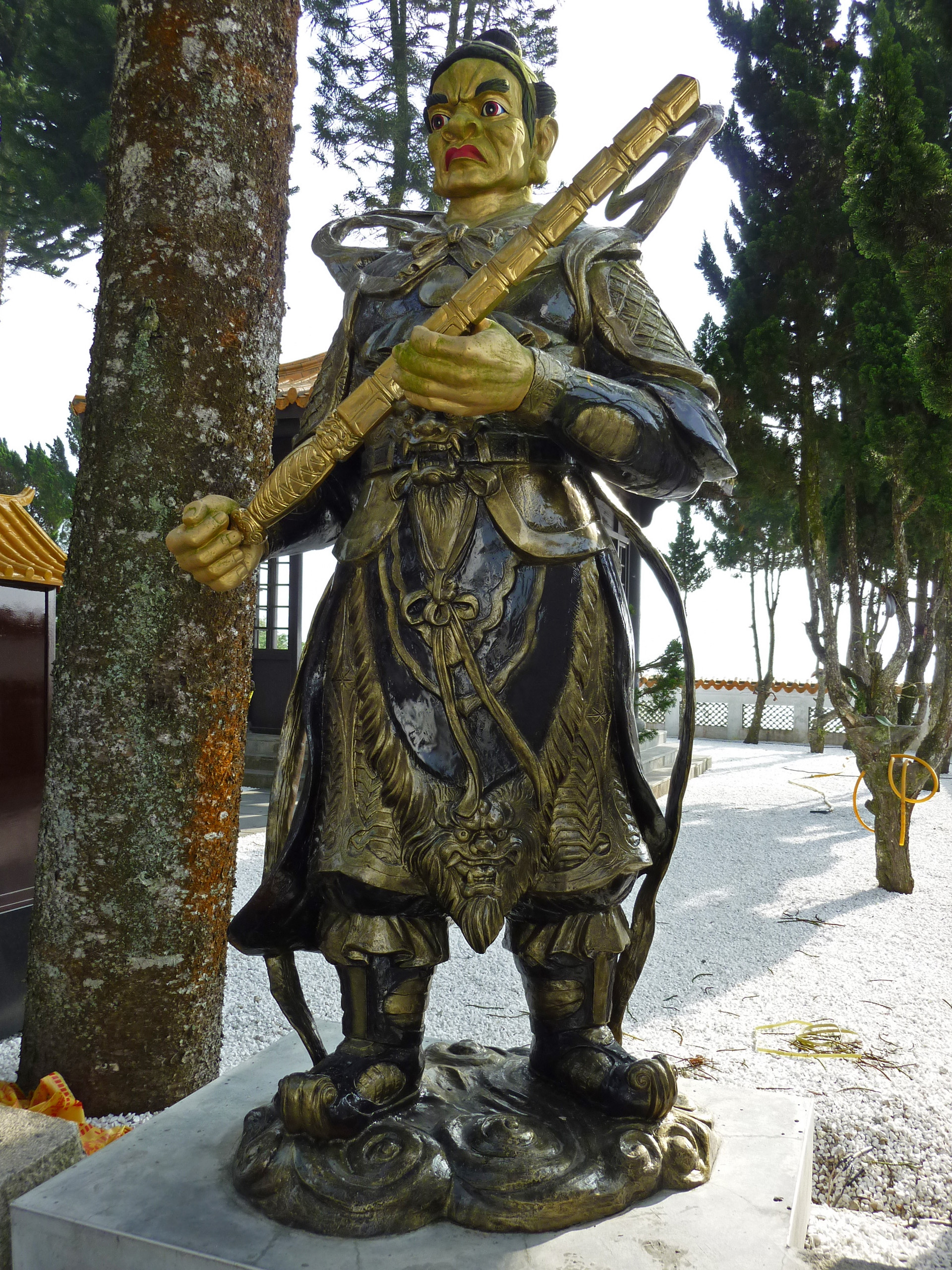
A statue of nio in front of Syuentzang Temple.

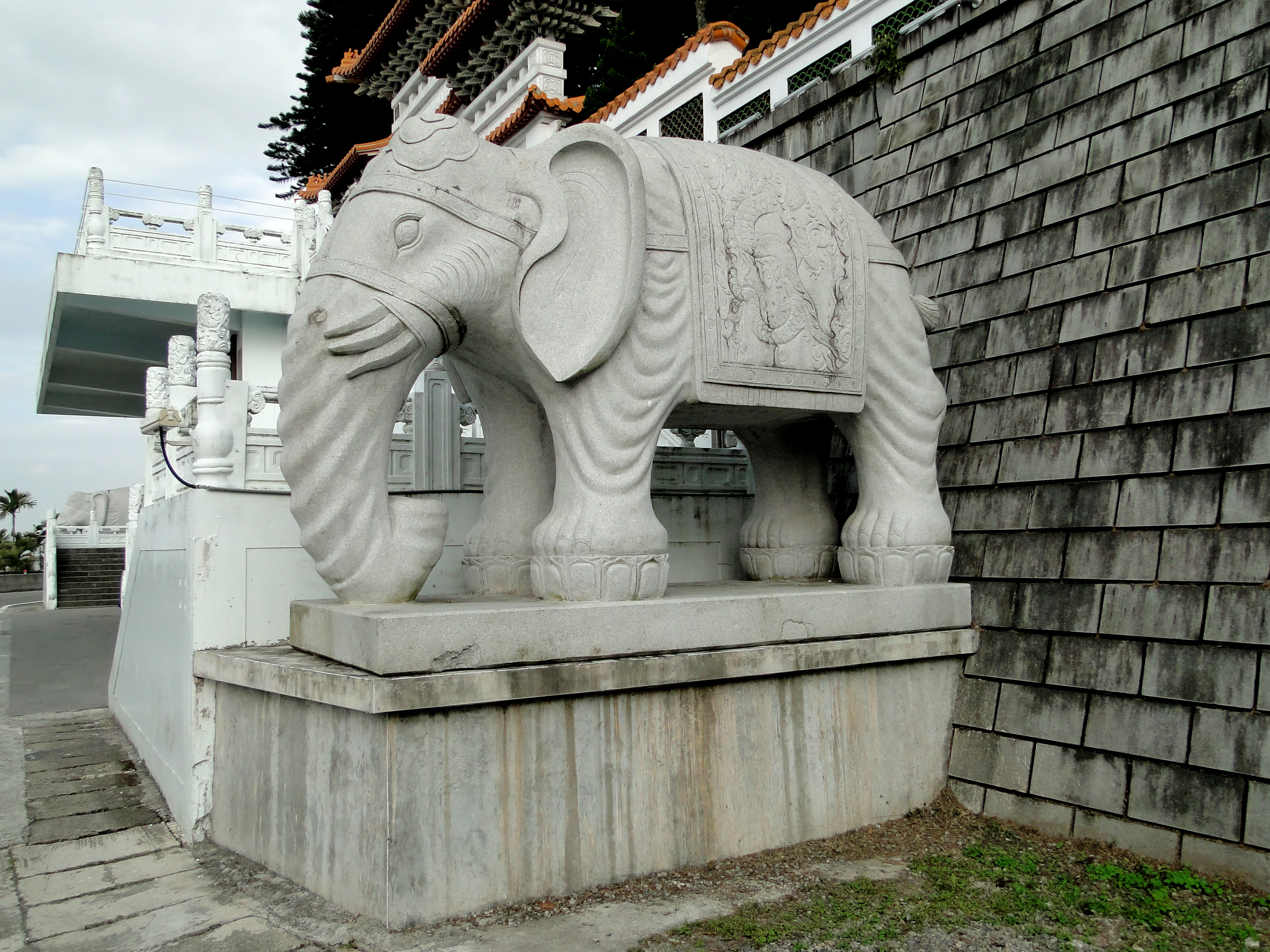
A statue of a white elephant in front of SyuentzangTemple.

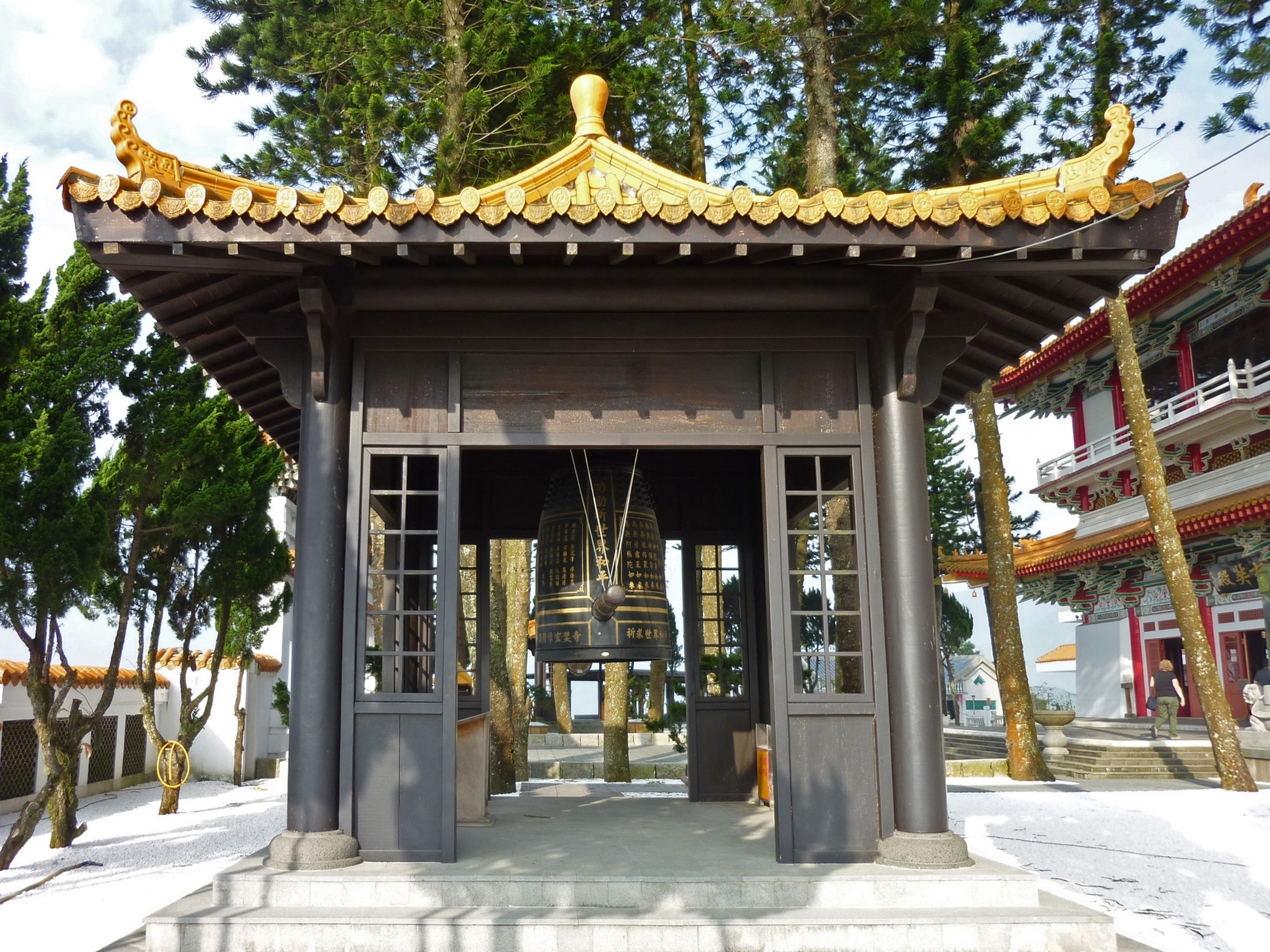
The Bell tower at Syuentzang Temple.
