= Lalu Island =

Small island in the center of Sun Moon Lake, Yuchi Township, Nantou County, Taiwan

Native name: 拉魯島
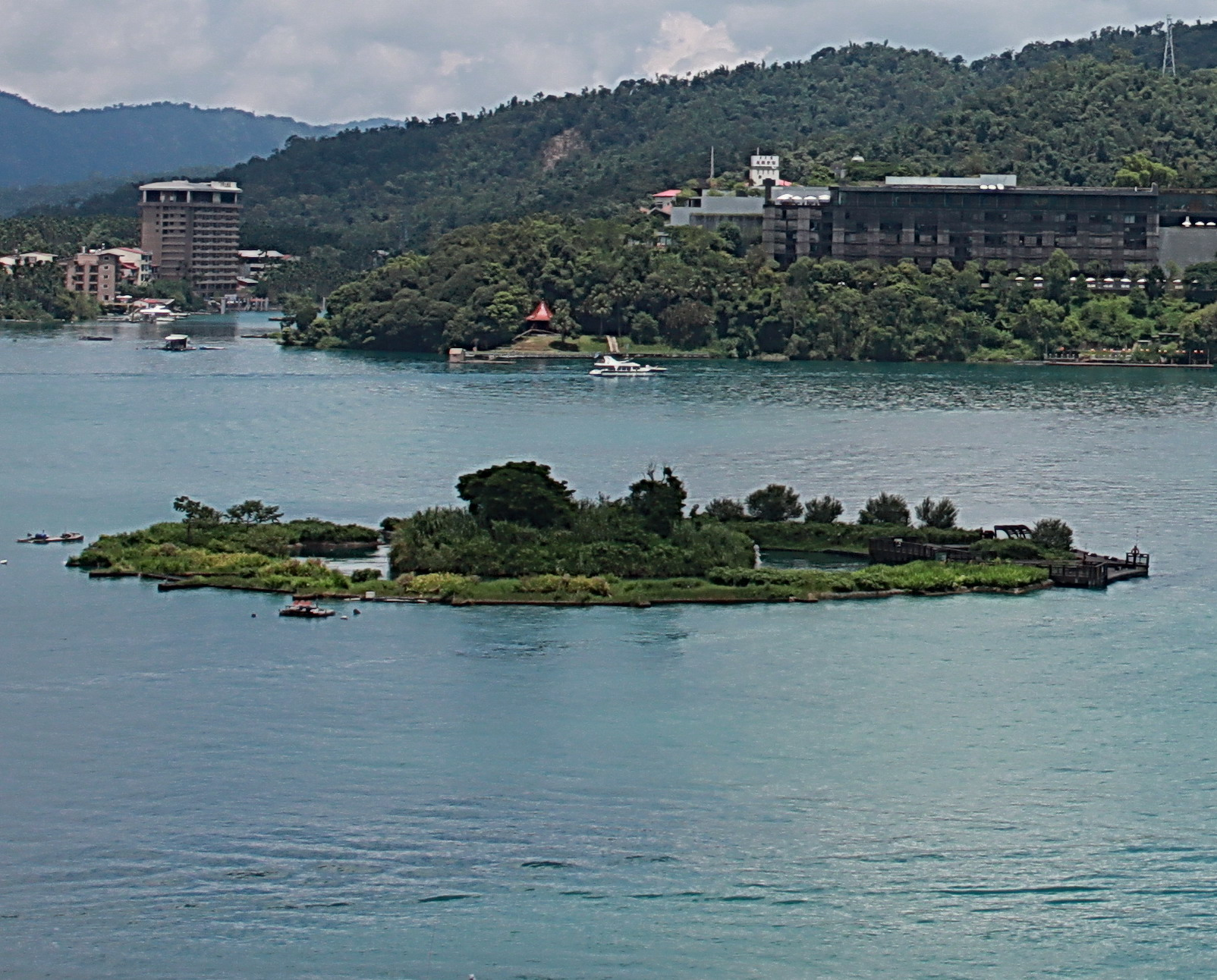
- Interactive map of Lalu Island

Geography
- Location: Yuchi, Nantou County, Taiwan
- Coordinates: 23°51′20″N 120°54′40″E
- Adjacent to: Sun Moon Lake
- Total islands: 1

Lalu Island (Thao language: Lalu; Chinese: 拉魯島; Pe̍h-ōe-jī: Lalu Tó; pinyin: Lālǔ Dǎo) is a small island in Sun Moon Lake, Yuchi Township, Nantou County, Taiwan. The island used to be much bigger, separating the lake into a part shaped like crescent moon and another part shaped like a round sun. When the island was still bigger, people lived on it; in fact, the locals called it "Pearl Mountain"(Chinese: 珠仔山 or 珠嶼; Pe̍h-ōe-jī: Chu-á-sū / Chu-sū) ever since the Qing dynasty. Under Japanese rule, the island was renamed "Jade Island" (Japanese: 玉島), and in the 1930s, the Japanese built a dam that raised the water level in the lake and almost entirely flooded the island. After Chiang Kai-shek's Nationalist Government moved to Taiwan in 1949, the island was renamed Kwanghwa Island (Chinese: 光華島; Pe̍h-ōe-jī: Kong-hôa-tó; lit. 'glorious China island'). In 1999 the island shrank as portions sank during the 1999 Jiji earthquake, which also destroyed a wedding pavilion constructed by the local government in 1978.

"Lalu" is an Austronesian word roughly corresponding to "after", "later" (Chinese: 後) with similar meanings from Taiwan to Indonesia. In legend, Thao hunters discovered Sun Moon Lake while chasing a white deer through the surrounding mountains. The deer eventually led them to the lake, which they found to be not only beautiful, but abundant with fish. Today, the white deer of legends is immortalized as a marble statue on Lalu Island.

In recent years, due to increasing social and political awareness, more deference and recognition are being given to Taiwanese aborigines. As a result, after the 921 earthquake, the island was renamed in the Thao language as "Lalu".

== Transportation ==
The island and surrounding area is accessible by buses from Taichung Station or Taipei Main Station.

== See also ==
- List of tourist attractions in Taiwan
- Sun Moon Lake
