= Thao language =

Austronesian language of Taiwan

Thao
- Sao
- Thau a lalawa
- Native to: Taiwan
- Ethnicity: 820 Thao (2020)
- Native speakers: 4 (2021)
- Language family: Austronesian: Western Plains Formosan; Thao
- Dialects: Brawbaw; Shtafari
- Writing system: Latin (Thao alphabet)

Language codes
- ISO 639-3: ssf
- Glottolog: thao1240
- ELP: Thao
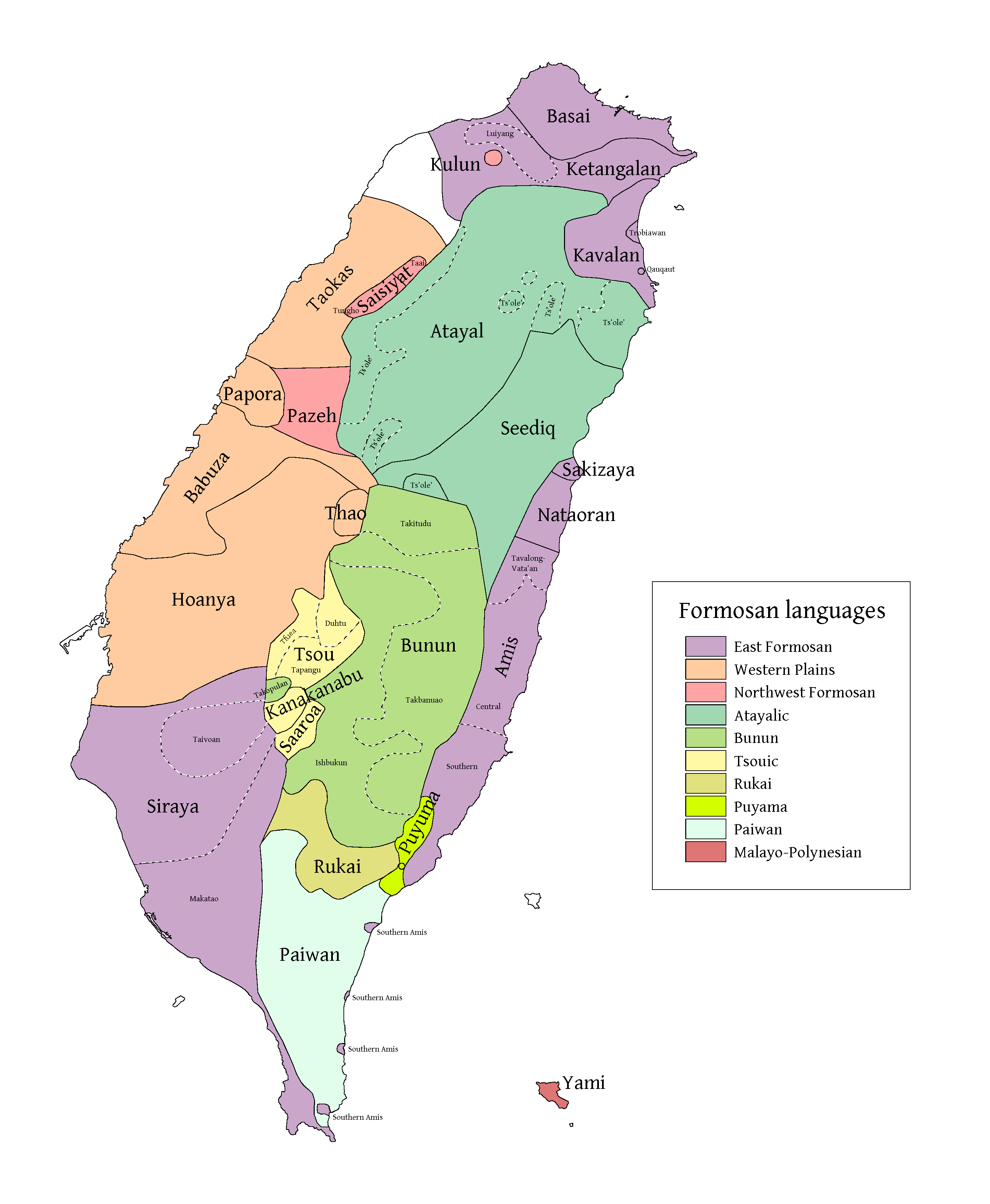
- Map of Formosan languages

- Thao is classified as Critically Endangered by the UNESCO Atlas of the World's Languages in Danger.

Thao (/ˈθaʊ/; endonym: Thau a lalawa), also known as Sao, is an Austronesian language. It is the nearly extinct language of the Thao people, an indigenous people of Taiwan from the Sun Moon Lake region in central Taiwan. It is a Formosan language of the Austronesian family; Barawbaw and Shtafari are dialects.

== Name ==
The name Thao literally means "person", from Proto-Austronesian *Cau. It is therefore cognate with the name of the Tsou.

== History ==
Speaking Thao was criminalised under Japanese rule of Taiwan and later the Kuomintang regime, contributing to its critically endangered status today.

A Thao-English dictionary by Robert A. Blust was published in 2003 by Academia Sinica's Institute of Linguistics.

In 2014, there were four L1 speakers and a fluent L2 speaker living in Ita Thaw (伊達邵, Yi Dashao) village (traditionally called Barawbaw), all but one of whom were over the age of sixty. Two elderly native speakers died in December of that year, including chief Tarma (袁明智, Yuan Mingzhi), age 75. Four elderly L1 speakers and some semi-speakers were reported in 2021.

== Phonology ==
=== Consonants ===
Consonant inventory
	Labial		Dental		Alveolar		Post- Alveolar		Velar		Uvular	Glottal
Plosive	p	b			t	d			k		q	ʔ ⟨ʼ⟩
Fricative	f		θ	ð	s		ʃ					h
Lateral Fricative					ɬ ⟨lh⟩							
Tap or Flap						ɾ						
Nasal		m				n				ŋ		
Approximant		w				l		j				

Orthographic notes:

- /θ ð ʃ/ are written ⟨th z sh⟩. However, /θ/ is written ⟨c⟩ in Blust's dictionary.
- /ŋ/ is written ⟨ng⟩. However, /ŋ/ is written ⟨g⟩ in Blust's dictionary (as in Fijian).

Notes:

- The glides /j w/ are derived from the underlying vowels /i u/ to meet the requirements that syllables must have onset consonants and to indicate stress placement accurately.
- /w/ realise as [v] intervocalically.

=== Vowels ===
Vowel inventory
	Front	Central	Back
High	i		u
Low		a	

Notes:

- Stress is penultimate, otherwise can be written ⟨á í ú⟩ as in "dadú", but doubling ⟨aa ii uu⟩ is also frequently used, as in "daduu".
- [e] and [o] occur as allophones of /i/ and /u/, respectively, when preceded or followed either by /q/ or /r/.

== Morphology ==
Thao has two or arguably three patterns of reduplication: Ca-reduplication, full reduplication, and rightward reduplication (which is sometimes considered to be a form of full reduplication).

Thao verbs have the following types of focus (Blust 2003:239).

1. Actor: -um- (present), ma- (future)
2. Patient: -in, -in-
3. Locative: -an

== Syntax ==
Thao word order can be both SVO and VSO, although the former is derived from Taiwanese Hokkien (Blust 2003:228).

The Thao personal marker is "ti" (Blust 2003:228). Negatives include "ani" and "antu"; "ata tu" is used in "don't" constructions. The perfect is marked by "iza", the past by an infix just after the primary onset consonant "-in-" and the future by the prefix "a-". Imperatives are marked by "-í" and softer imperatives or requests roughly translated as "please" by "-uan" sometimes spelled "-wan" which can co-occur with "-í".

== Pronouns ==
The Thao personal pronouns below are from Blust (2003:207). Note that there is only 1 form each for "we (exclusive)," "you (plural)" and "they."

Thao Personal Pronouns
Type of Pronoun	Nominative	Accusative	Genitive	Agent	Patient
1s.	yaku	yakin	nak		
2s.	ihu	ihu-n	m-ihu	uhu	uhu-n
3s.	thithu	thithu-n	thithu		
1p. (incl.)	ita	ita-n	m-ita		
1p. (excl.)	yamin	yamin	yamin		
2p.	maniun	maniun	maniun		
3p.	thaythuy	thaythuy	thaythuy		

Other pronouns include:

- minmihu - for you
- panmihu - as for you
- panihun - because of you
- shanaihun - up to you
- shaunatazihun - go to your place
- shmunaihun - bring to you
- nakin - for me
- panyakin - as for me
- pashiyakin - leave me
- shanayayakin - up to me
- shmunayakin - bring me

== Affixes ==
The following affixes are sourced from Blust (2003:92-188) and adjusted to the modern spelling.

- a- : only found in /kan/ 'eat'
- -ak : '1st person singular (I)'
- ak- ... -in : 'morning, noon, evening meals'
- an- : uncertain function
- -an : Verbal uses can be indicative, imperative, or adversative.
- i- : prefix or clitic particle marking location
- -i : imperative
- -ik : patient focus (1st person singular)
- -in- : perfective or completive aspect
- -in : patient focus
- ish- : found most with intransitive verbs (uncommon prefix)
- ka- : 'to make an X', 'two times' (with reduplication)
- ka- ... -an : meaning unclear
- kal- : 'X told'
- kalh- : 'to pile, spread'
- kash- : 'intensity, repetition'
- kashi- : meaning uncertain
- kashi- ... -an : 'pull by the X'
- kashun- : derives verbs referring to positions of the human body, or sometimes objects such as boats
- kat- : 'gradually become X'
- ki- : 'stand, stay'; other possible meanings as well
- ki- ... -an : 'be affected with pain in the X'
- kilh- : 'search for, seek'
- kin- : 'to pick or gather X'
- kit- ... -in : 'infested with X'
- ku- : 'to perform an action with X' (when used with tools or weapons); less specific in other contexts
- kun- : 'sudden or abrupt action', 'to eat the X meal', 'to do X times'; meaning unclear sometimes
- la- : usually found in expressions of quantity of degree
- lhin- : causative sense
- lhun- : swelling-related meanings, etc.
- m- : marks the genitive in 'you (2s)' and 'we (incl.)'
- ma- : marks stative verbs, occasionally nouns derived from stative verbs
- ma- : active verb prefix
- ma- : prefix marking the future in actor focus verbs
- ma- : 'tens' (used with numbers)
- mak- : intransitive verbs
- maka- : 'to resemble X' (people), 'produce X' (plant or animal parts), 'from/in/to X' (deictic/directional expressions)
- makin- : intransitive verbs; 'Xth from the bottom' (with numerals)
- makit- : 'happen gradually', 'perform X gradually'
- maku- : directional sense, and is followed by /na/- (though it does not follow not in non-locative expressions)
- malhi- : 'give birth to an X'
- man- : generally used with dynamic, intransitive verbs
- mana- : generally found with directional verbs
- mapa- : 'reciprocal', 'collective action'
- mash- : 'to speak X' (language), 'walk with an X' (positions or conditions of the leg)
- masha- : relates to body positions, or may have a directional meaning
- mashi- : comparatives (with stative bases of measurement); often synonymous with /ma/- (stative verb marker)
- mat- : derives intransitive or stative verbs
- mati- : locative expressions
- matin- + full reduplication : 'X-ish' or 'spotted with X' (colors)
- mi- : derives intransitive verbs, often with some form of base reduplication
- mi- + Ca reduplication : 'do with a group of X'
- mya- : used to derive various verbs
- min- : derives inchoative verbs (Bunun loan?); 'become an X' or 'become like an X' (with kinship terms)
- mu- : most frequently derives verbs of motion; 'go into X; enter X' (with concrete nouns that refer to structures or places capable of being entered); 'search for X' (with names of useful plants); 'do X times' (numeral bases and expressions of quantity)
- mun- : intransitive verbs
- -n : derives accusative pronouns from nominative bases
- na- : most commonly with verbs indicating change of location; 'it's up to X'
- pa- : causative of dynamic verbs (verbs with -/um/-); 'make X do Y' or 'let X do Y'; active transitive (or intransitive) verb with no causative argument/sense
- pak- : 'exude X' (body fluids, other natural fluids/substances); intransitive verb prefix
- pan- : 'perform X in a downward direction'
- pan- ... -an : used with terms for lineal consanguines to derive the corresponding collateral terms of the same generation (e.g., 'father' > 'uncle', 'grandparent' > 'grandparental sibling')
- pash- ... -an : 'place in which X is kept'
- pashi- : generally causative sense (often with Ca-reduplication); 'let X do it' or 'let X have it' (with the accusative forms of personal pronouns)
- pashi- ... -an : 'put X on' or 'wear X'
- pat- : generally causative sense
- pi- : causative verbs of location (can be paired with /i/- 'at, in, on'); may also form non-locative verbs
- pya- : forms causative verbs (usually have stative counterparts with /ma/-; note that /pa/- and -/um/- are also counterparts.); simulative verb
- pik- : generally causative sense
- pin- : generally forms causative verbs or deverbal nouns
- pish- : 'play X' (musical instruments); inchoative sense (sometimes with an implied element of suddenness); causative sense
- pu- : causative or transitive counterpart of the movement prefix /mu/-, which is intransitive; 'use an X' or 'put in an X' (with names of some tools); 'send out an X' (with names of plant parts)
- pu- ... -an : to wear X' (body ornaments)
- pun- : 'to catch X' (animals used for food)
- qata- : bodily movement, observation, and the like
- sha- : directional sense ('facing', etc.)
- shan-na-Ca- ... : 'it's up to X' (often with pronouns)
- shau- : 'go to X' or 'arrive at X' (with bases that have an inherently locative sense or temporal sense)
- shi- : appears to mark past tense (as opposed to the perfective aspect marker -/in/-)
- shi- : sometimes appears with commands
- shi-X-X : 'X-ish, somewhat X'
- shi-X-iz: 'X times'
- shu- : 'bring X' or 'take X' (with pronominal and deictic bases)
- tana- : generally directional sense (from Bunun /tana/- 'prefix of direction')
- tau- : 'to carry X' (with concrete nouns); 'to turn to X' (with bases having a directional meaning)
- tish- : forms both transitive and intransitive verbs; often refers to results of non-deliberate actions
- tu-Ca- ... : 'the odor of X'
- -um- : actor focus infix
- un- ... -an : 'undesirable bodily conditions or afflictions'; 'figurative extension of a physical affliction'
- -un : equivalent of -/in/ 'patient focus' (borrowed from Bunun)
- -wak : 1st person singular actor (apparently distinct from -/ak/)
- -wan : 'X's turn (to do something)'
- ya- : only comes after /mapa/- 'reciprocal or collective action'
- -zan : 'X paces' (used with numerals)

Quasi-affixes

- kan 'step, walk'
- lhqa 'live, living'
- pasaháy 'to use'
- qalha 'much, many'
- sa (usually almost impossible to translate in most environments)
