= Ita Thao Pier =

Pier in Yuchi, Nantou County, Taiwan

Ita Thao Pier 伊達邵碼頭
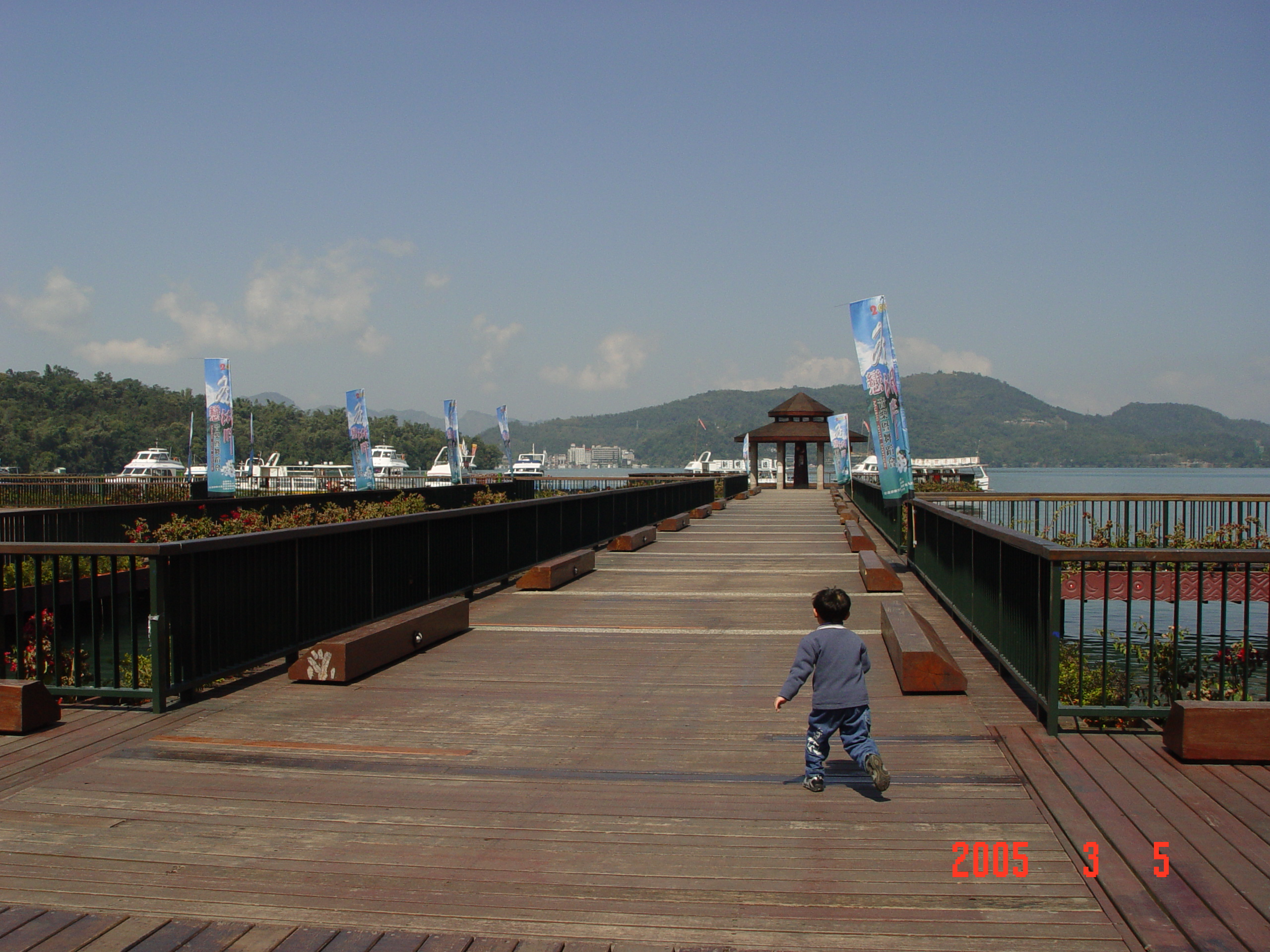
- Type: pier
- Location: Yuchi, Nantou County, Taiwan
- Coordinates: 23°50′58.4″N 120°55′43.4″E

The Ita Thao Pier (traditional Chinese: 伊達邵碼頭; simplified Chinese: 伊达邵码头; pinyin: Yīdáshào Mǎtóu) is a pier at Sun Moon Lake in Yuchi Township, Nantou County, Taiwan.

== Architecture ==
The pier features the Ita Thao Visitor Center which also houses the ticketing counter.

== Destinations ==
The pier serves for destinations to Shuishe Pier and Xuanguang Pier at the other perimeter sides of Sun Moon Lake.

== Around the pier ==
- Sun Moon Lake Ropeway

== See also ==
- Transportation in Taiwan
