= Xuanguang Pier =

Pier in Yuchi, Nantou County, Taiwan

Xuanguang Pier 玄光碼頭
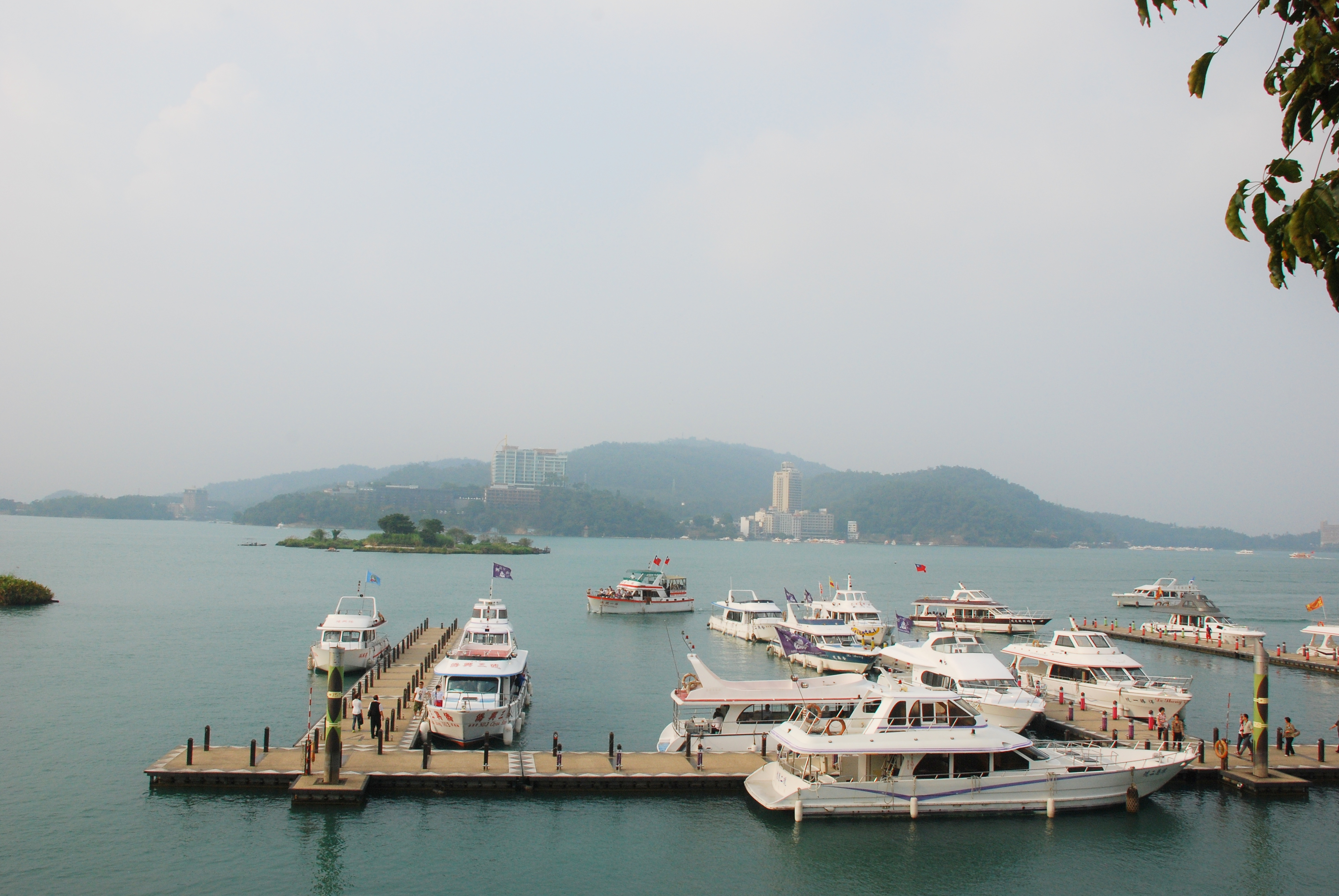
- Type: pier
- Location: Yuchi, Nantou County, Taiwan
- Coordinates: 23°51′10.1″N 120°54′47.4″E

The Xuanguang Pier (traditional Chinese: 玄光碼頭; simplified Chinese: 玄光码头; pinyin: Xuánguāng Mǎtóu) is a pier at Sun Moon Lake in Yuchi Township, Nantou County, Taiwan.

== History ==
Due to the continuing drought which caused water shortage in the lake in early 2021, the pier had to be temporarily closed starting 1 April 2021.

== Destinations ==
The pier serves for destinations to Ita Thao Pier and Shuishe Pier at the other perimeter sides of Sun Moon Lake.

== See also ==
- Transportation in Taiwan
