= Zhaowu Pier =

Pier in Yuchi, Nantou County, Taiwan

Zhaowu Pier 朝霧碼頭
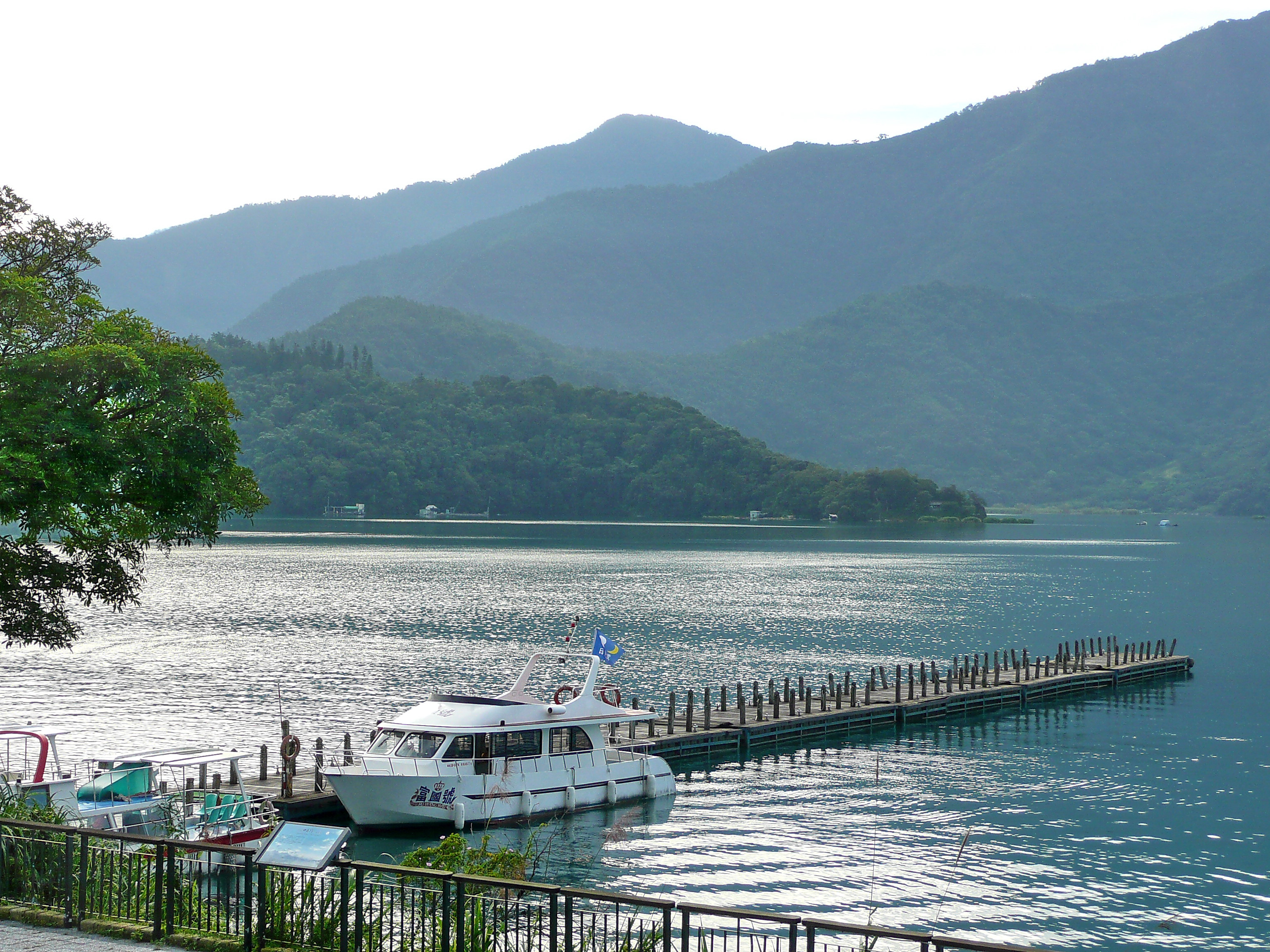
- Type: pier
- Location: Yuchi, Nantou County, Taiwan
- Coordinates: 23°52′03.6″N 120°54′58.7″E

The Zhaowu Pier (traditional Chinese: 朝霧碼頭; simplified Chinese: 朝雾码头; pinyin: Cháowù Mǎtóu) is a pier at Sun Moon Lake in Yuchi Township, Nantou County, Taiwan.

== History ==
Due to the continuing drought which caused water shortage in the lake in early 2021, the pier had to be temporarily closed starting 1 April 2021.

== See also ==
- Transportation in Taiwan
