= Hanbi Trail =

Trail in Yuchi, Nantou County, Taiwan

Coordinates: 23°51′44.3″N 120°54′31.7″E

Hanbi Trail 涵碧步道
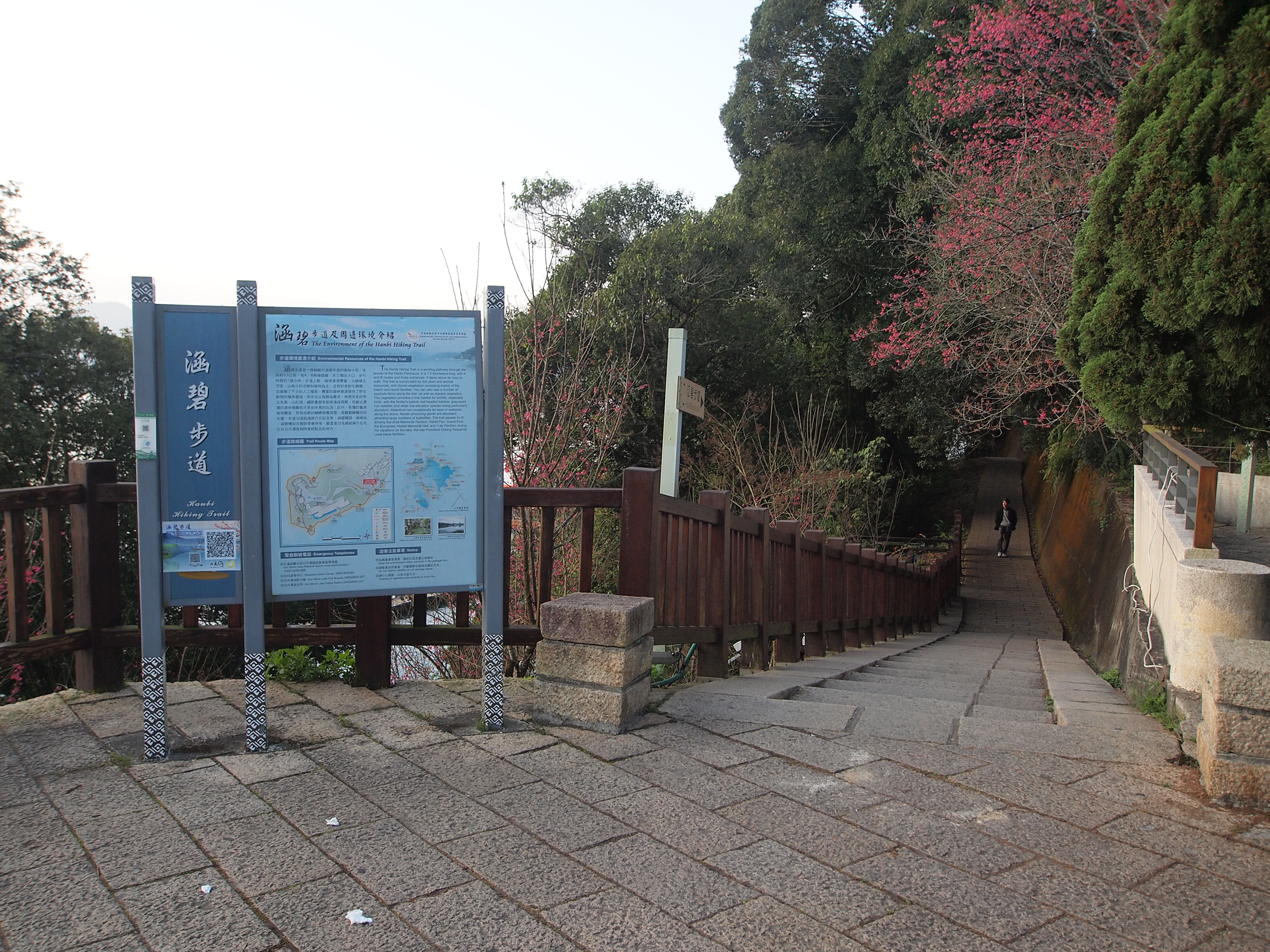
- Length: 2 km
- Location: Yuchi, Nantou County, Taiwan
- Trailheads: Meihe Garden
- Use: walking

Hanbi Trail (Chinese: 涵碧步道; pinyin: Hánbì Bùdào) is a trail in Sun Moon Lake, Yuchi Township, Nantou County, Taiwan.

== History ==
The trail used to be the path in which President Chiang Kai-shek and his wife Soong Mei-ling used to walk every time they visited the area.

== Architecture ==
The entrance of the path is located at Meihe Garden. The path is 2 km long and it is relatively not too steep. It is made of red bricks.

== See also ==
- List of roads in Taiwan
