= Sun Moon Lake Ropeway =

Gondola lift in Yuchi, Nantou County, Taiwan

- 日月潭纜車
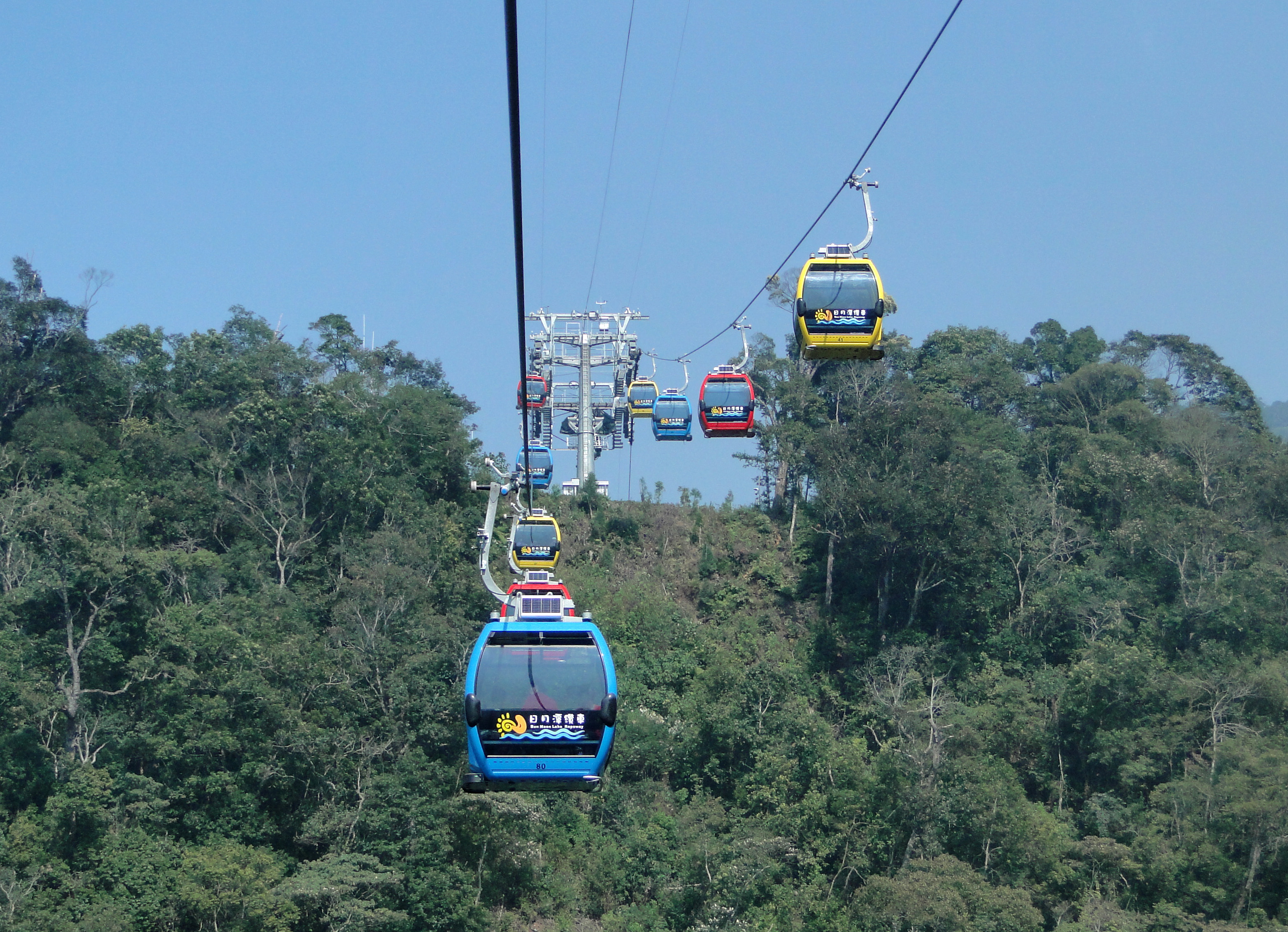

Overview
- Location: Yuchi, Nantou County, Taiwan
- Elevation: highest: 1,044 meters
- No. of stations: 2
- Construction cost: NT$1 billion
- Website: Official website

Operation
- No. of carriers: 86
- Carrier capacity: 8 passengers
- Ridership: 3,000 passengers per hour
- Operating times: 10:30 a.m. - 4:00 p.m. (weekdays); 10:00 a.m. - 4:30 p.m. (public holidays and weekends)
- Trip duration: 6.8 minutes (at full speed)
- Fare: NT$300 (round trip)

Technical features
- Manufactured by: Doppelmayr
- Line length: 1,877 m (6,158 ft) (path); 1,925 m (6,316 ft) (total length)
- No. of support towers: 16
- Installed power: 903 kW
- Operating speed: 6 m/s (20 ft/s) (maximum)
- Maximum Gradient: 43°

The Sun Moon Lake Ropeway (traditional Chinese: 日月潭纜車; simplified Chinese: 日月潭缆车; pinyin: Rìyuètán Lǎnchē) is a gondola lift in Yuchi Township, Nantou County, Taiwan.

== History ==
The construction of the ropeway took around 18 months. On 14 December 2009, it passed the inspection of Nantou County Government. The soft opening of the ropeway to the public was done on 28 December 2009 and the official opening was carried out on 31 March 2010.

== Geology ==
The ropeway runs through two Buji mountains with an altitude of 996 meters and 1,044 meters.

== Stations ==
The ropeway consists of two stations, which are Sun Moon Lake Station and Formosan Aboriginal Culture Village Station.

=== Sun Moon Lake Station ===
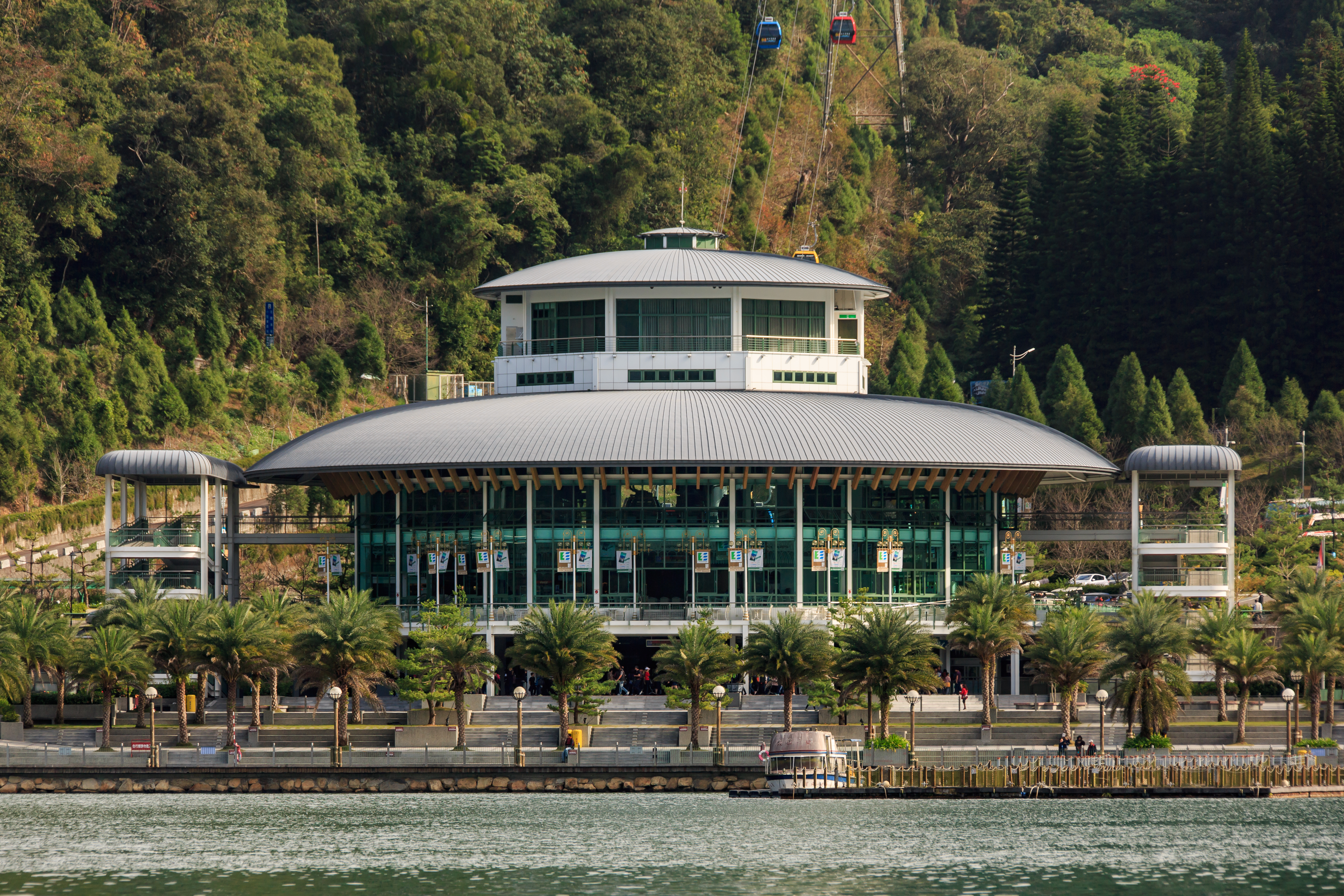
Sun Moon Lake Station

The Sun Moon Lake Station is located at the edge of Sun Moon Lake. The station spans over an area of 3.74 hectares.

=== Formosan Aboriginal Culture Village Station ===
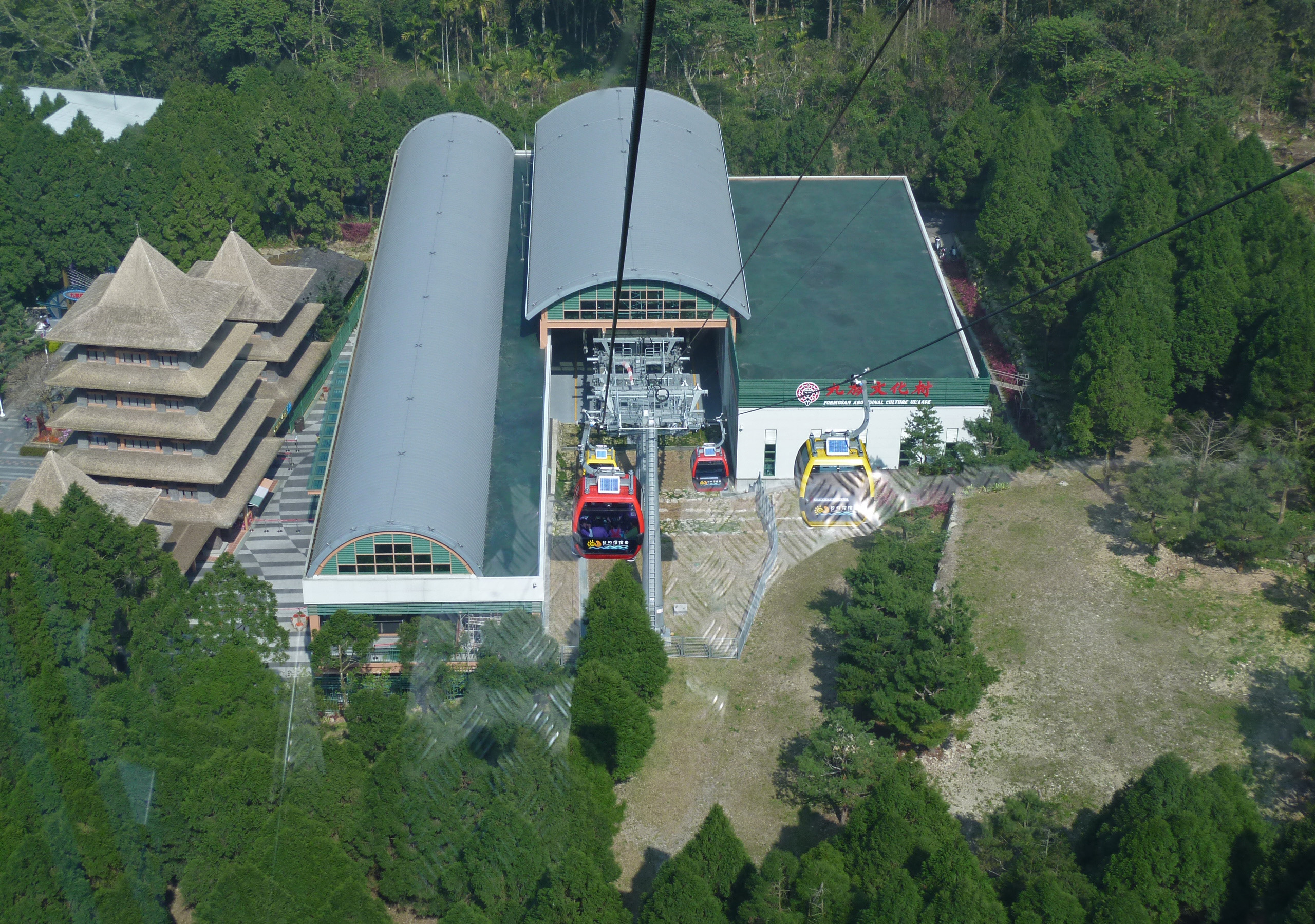
Formosan Aboriginal Culture Village Station

The Formosan Aboriginal Culture Village Station at the entrance of Formosan Aboriginal Culture Village.

== Technical specifications ==
The ropeway consists of 16 supporting towers. It has a 1,877 meters of path length and 1,925 meters of total length. The gondola consists of red, yellow and blue colors, which represent the sun, moon and lake respectively. It has a total of 86 cars with maximum carrying capacity of 3,000 passengers per hour.

== Safety features ==
The ropeway has self-propelled emergency vehicles in the event of an emergency. It is also equipped with high extension detection device to automatically adjust its cable tension.
