= Shuishe Pier =

Pier in Yuchi, Nantou County, Taiwan

Shuishe Pier 水社碼頭
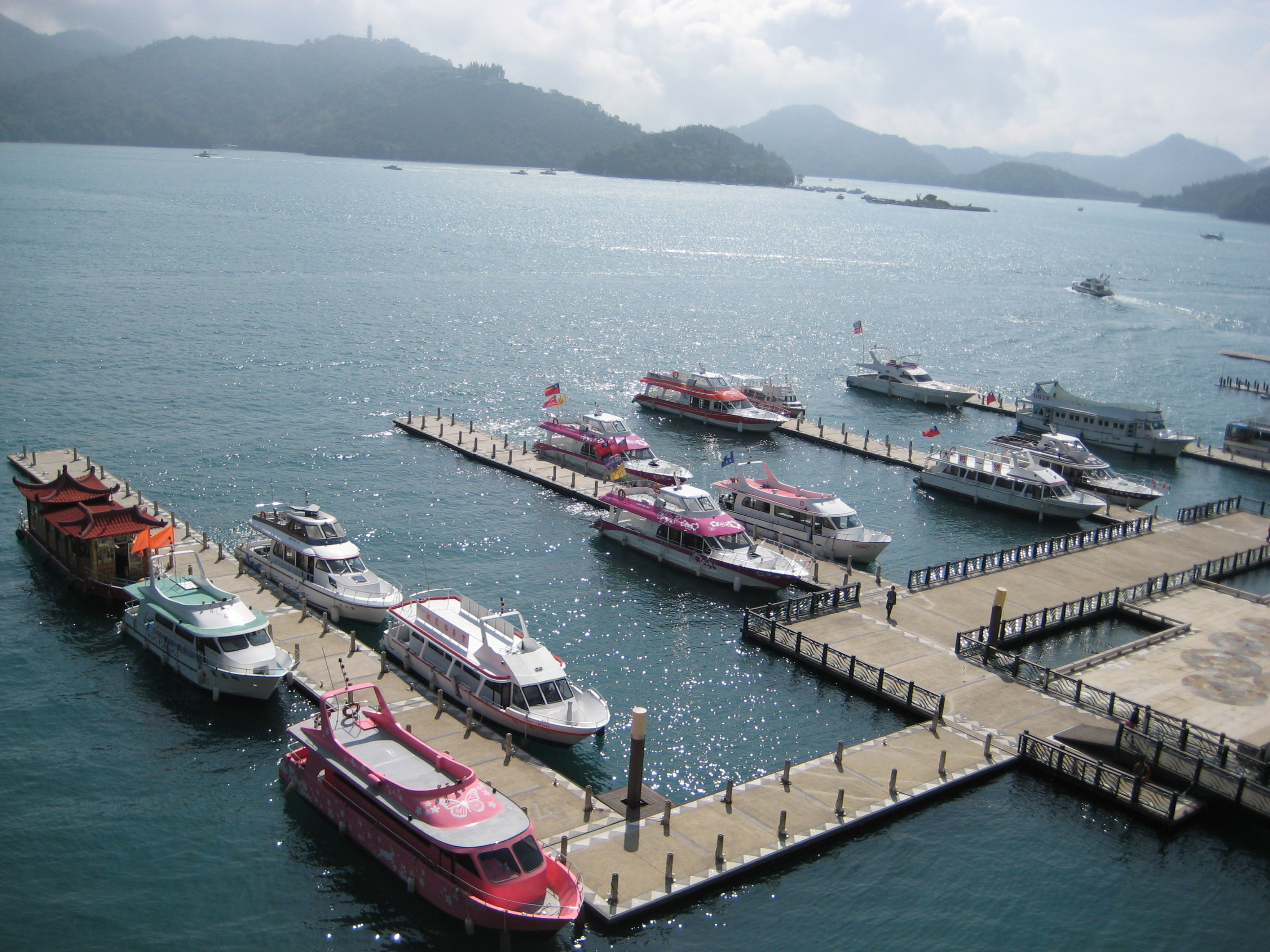
- Type: pier
- Spans: Sun Moon Lake
- Location: Yuchi, Nantou County, Taiwan
- Coordinates: 23°51′52.1″N 120°54′42.5″E

The Shuishe Pier (traditional Chinese: 水社碼頭; simplified Chinese: 水社码头; pinyin: Shuǐshè Mǎtóu) is a pier at Sun Moon Lake in Yuchi Township, Nantou County, Taiwan.

== Destinations ==
The pier serves for destinations to Ita Thao Pier and Xuanguang Pier at the other perimeter sides of Sun Moon Lake.

== Transportation ==
The pier is accessible by bus from Taichung HSR station or Taichung TRA station.

== See also ==
- Transportation in Taiwan
