= Ci En Pagoda =

Pagoda in Yuchi, Nantou County, Taiwan

- 慈恩塔
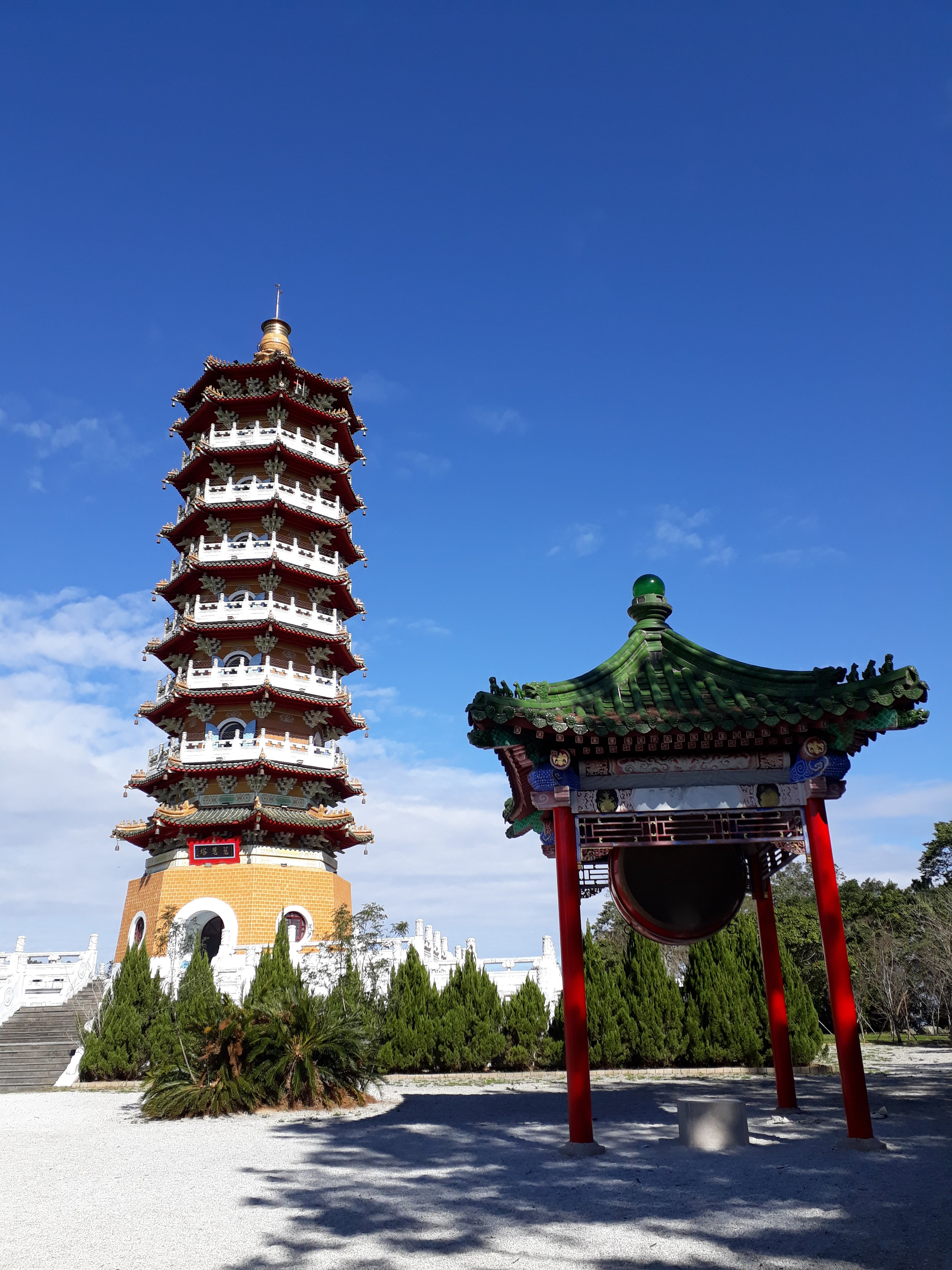

- Location within Nantou County

Location
- Location: Yuchi, Nantou County, Taiwan
- Interactive map of Ci En Pagoda
- Coordinates: 23°50′31.1″N 120°55′14.9″E

Architecture
- Type: pagoda
- Completed: April 1971

Specifications
- Height (max): 46 m
- Elevation: 954 m (3,130 ft)

The Ci En Pagoda (Chinese: 慈恩塔; pinyin: Cí'ēn Tǎ) is a pagoda in Yuchi Township, Nantou County, Taiwan.

== History ==
President Chiang Kai-shek decided to construct the pagoda as a memory to his late mother Wang Caiyu (王采玉). During the construction, materials had to be brought in through the Sun Moon Lake and up the mountain. The construction was then completed by April 1971.

== Architecture ==
The octagonal pagoda was constructed with a traditional Chinese architectural style on top of Mount Shabalan with an elevation of 954-metre (3,130 ft). The height of the pagoda is 46-metre (151 ft), which consists of 12 floors in total. The lower 3 floors were painted in white and the upper 9 floors were painted in golden red.

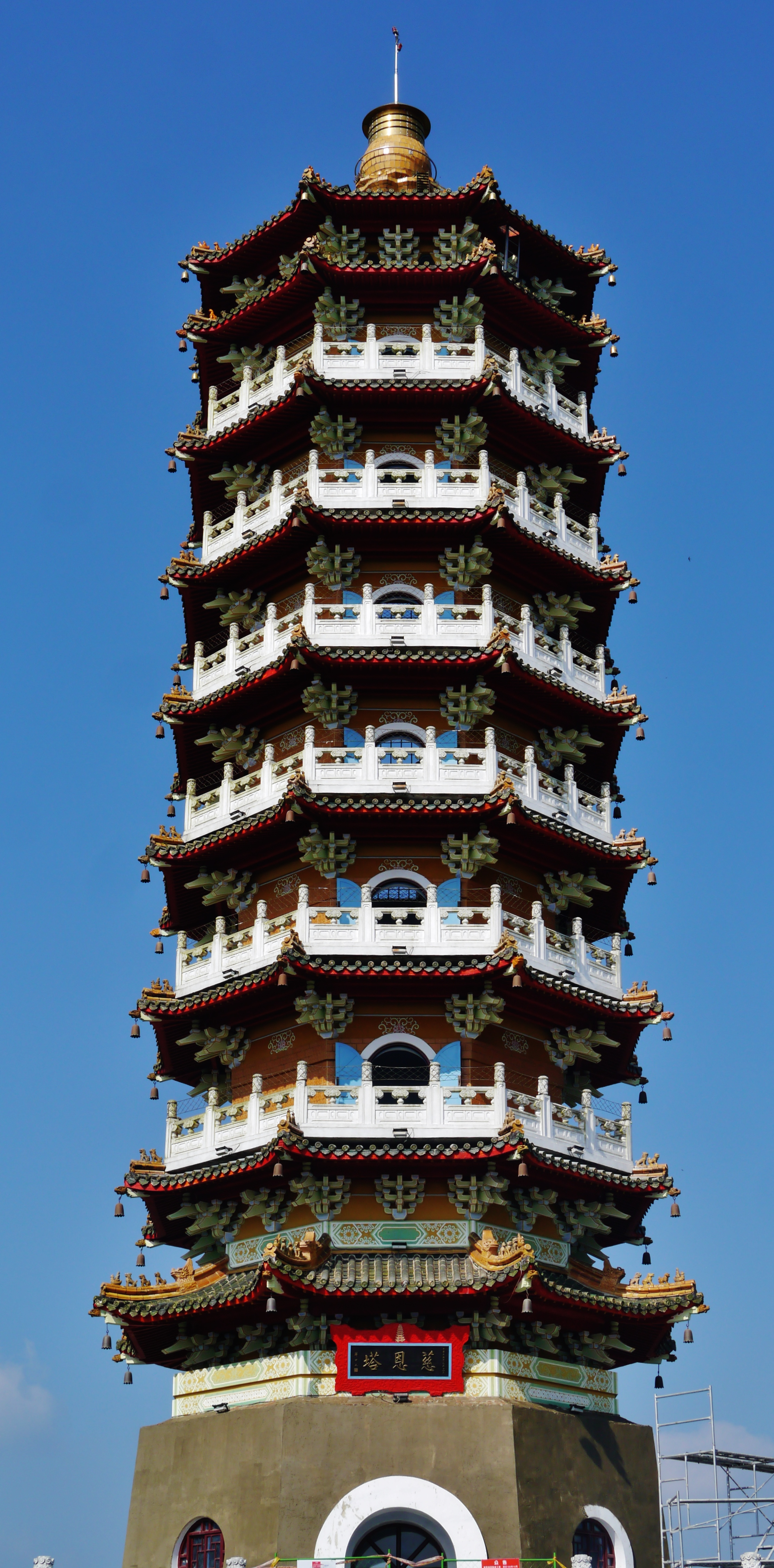
Pagoda

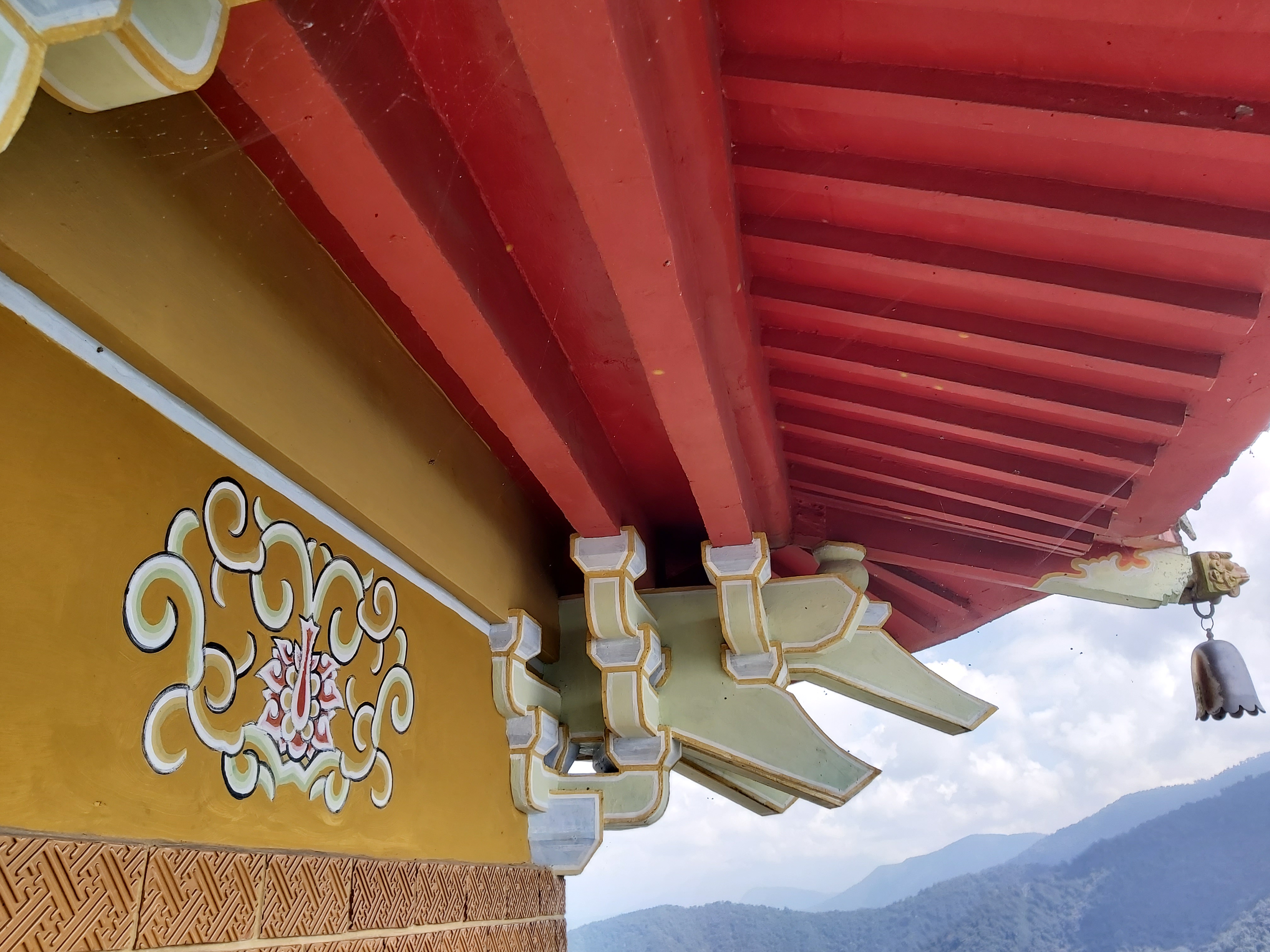
Eaves of Pagoda

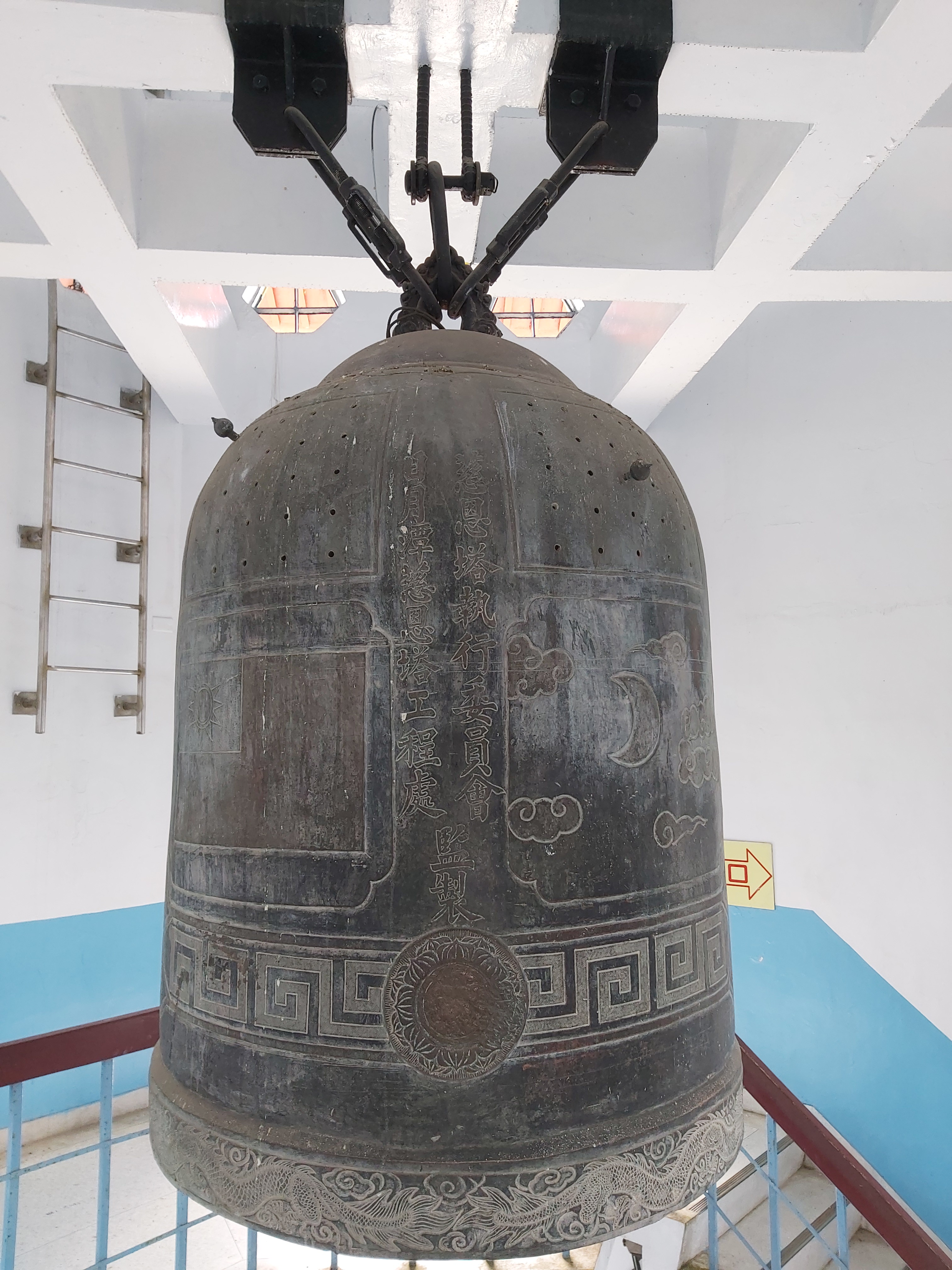
The bell

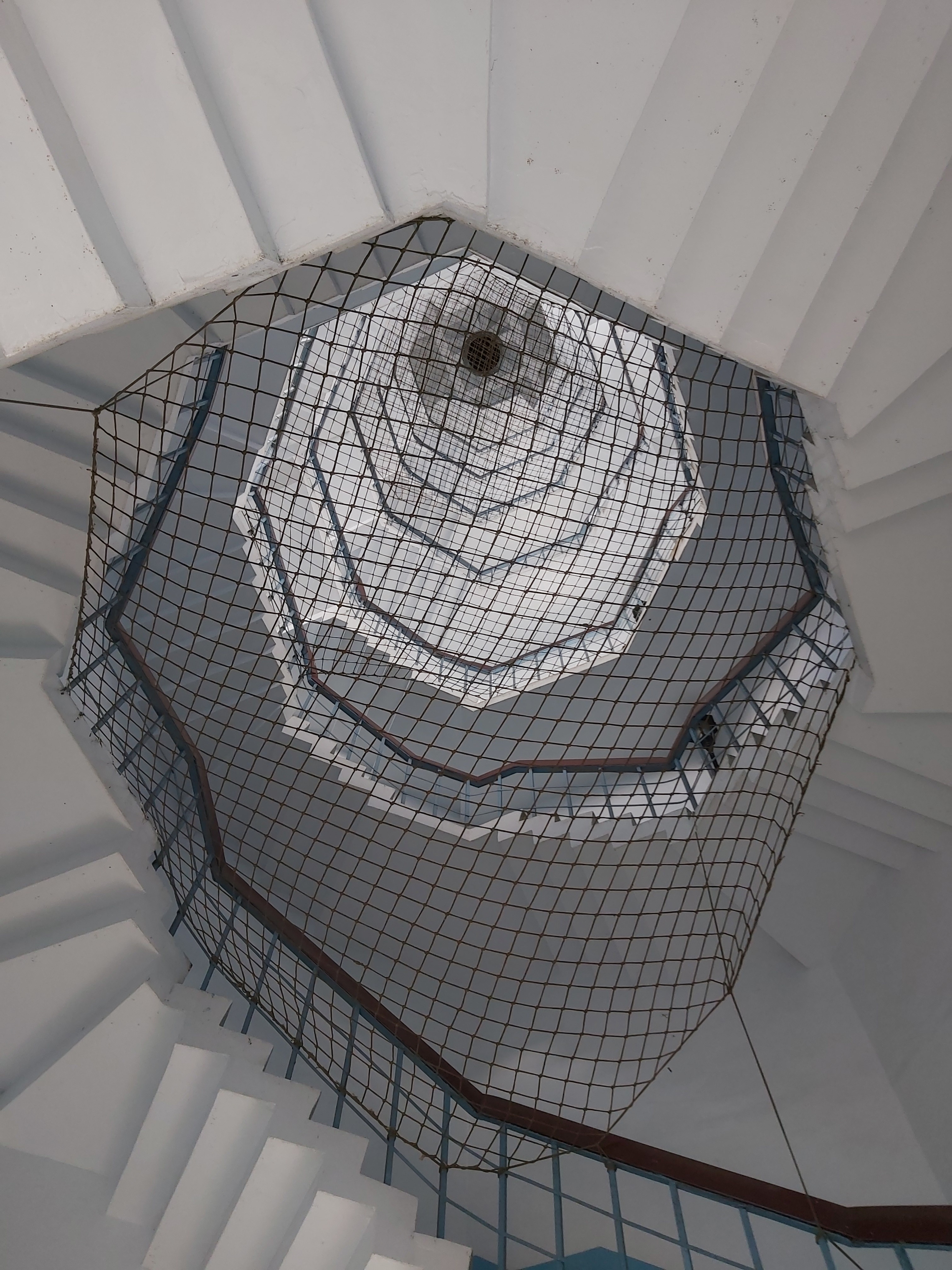
Stairs in the pagoda 1

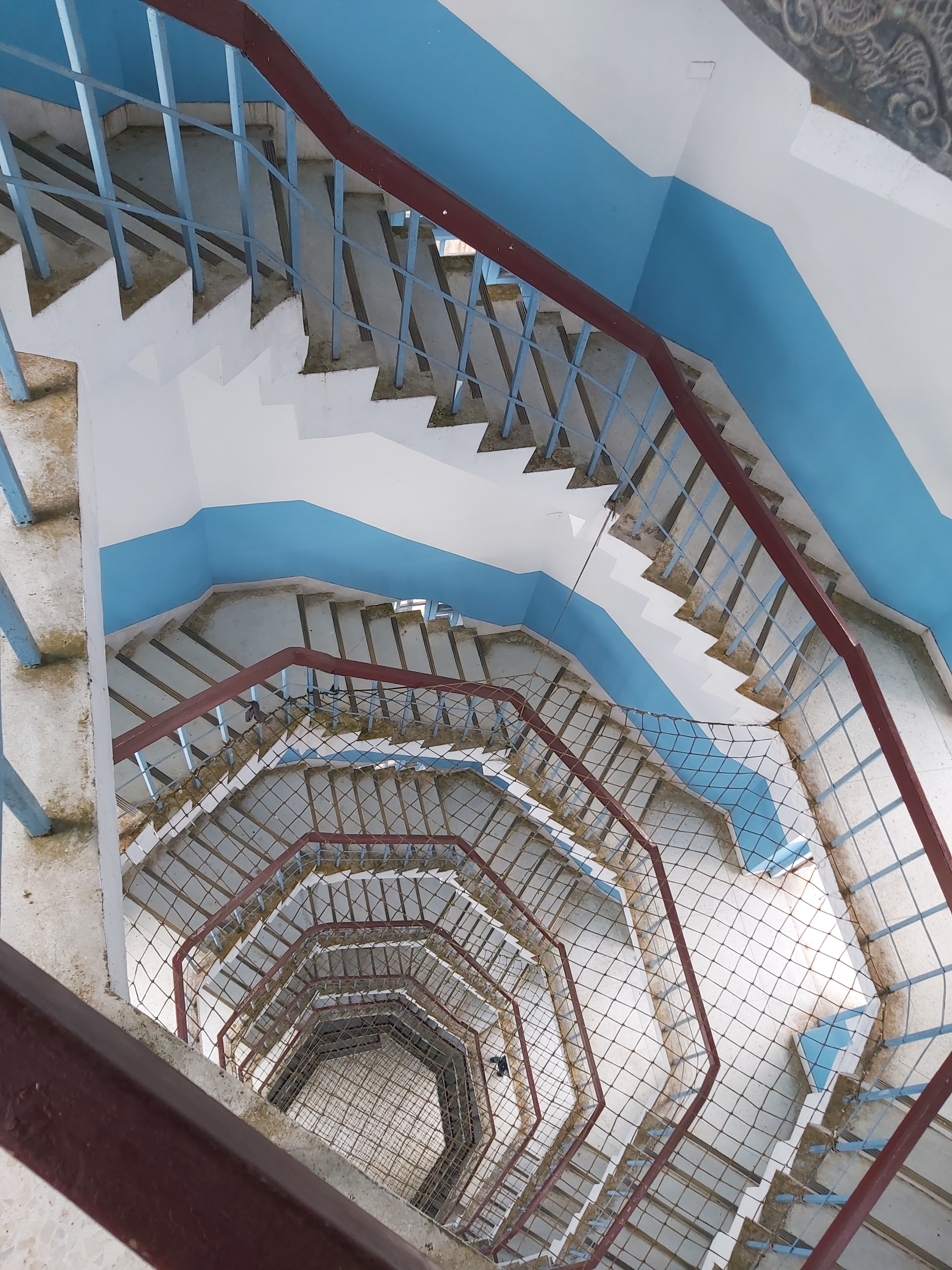
Stairs in the pagoda 2

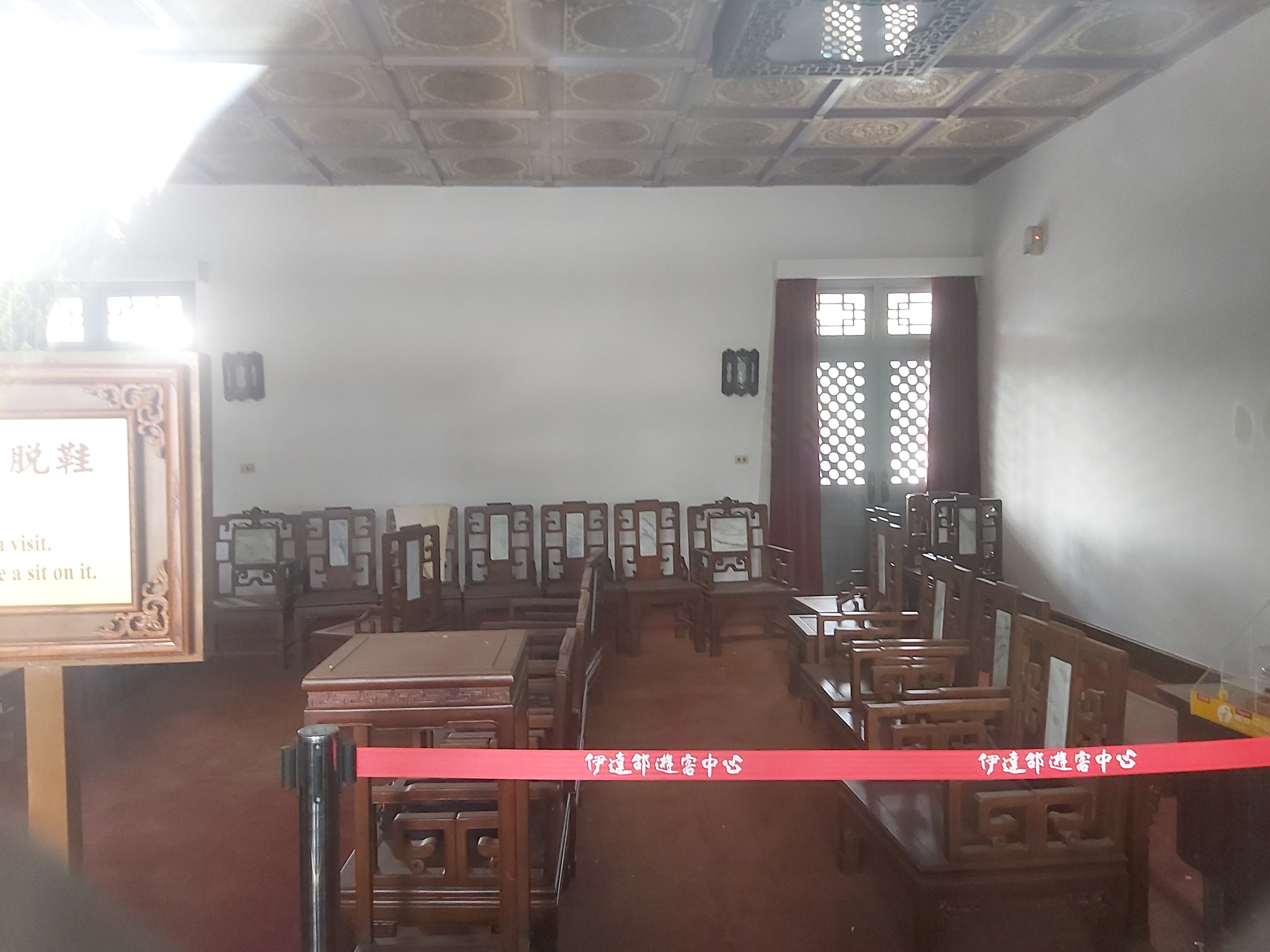
Memorial Hall of Lady Wang

== Views gallery ==
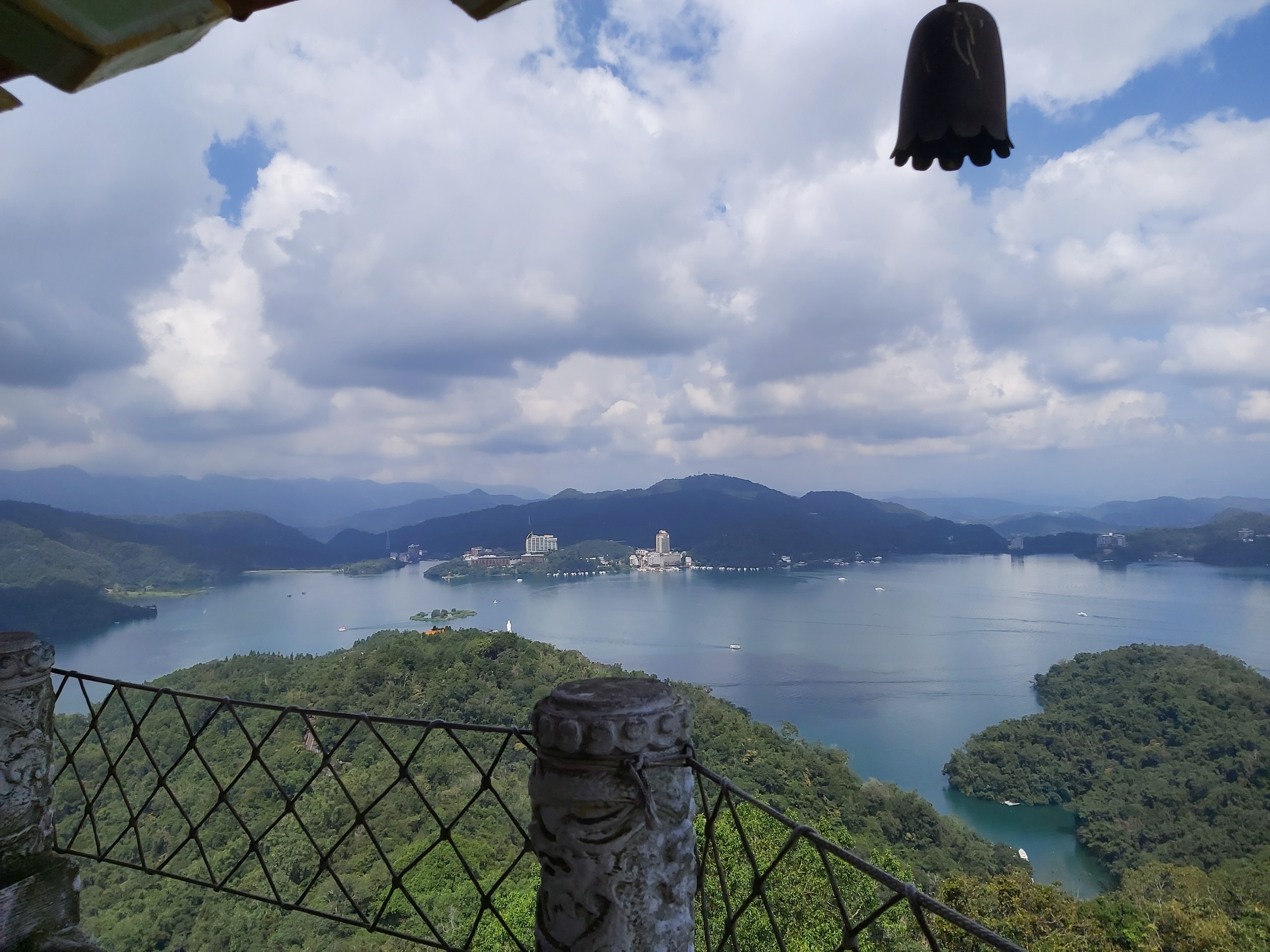

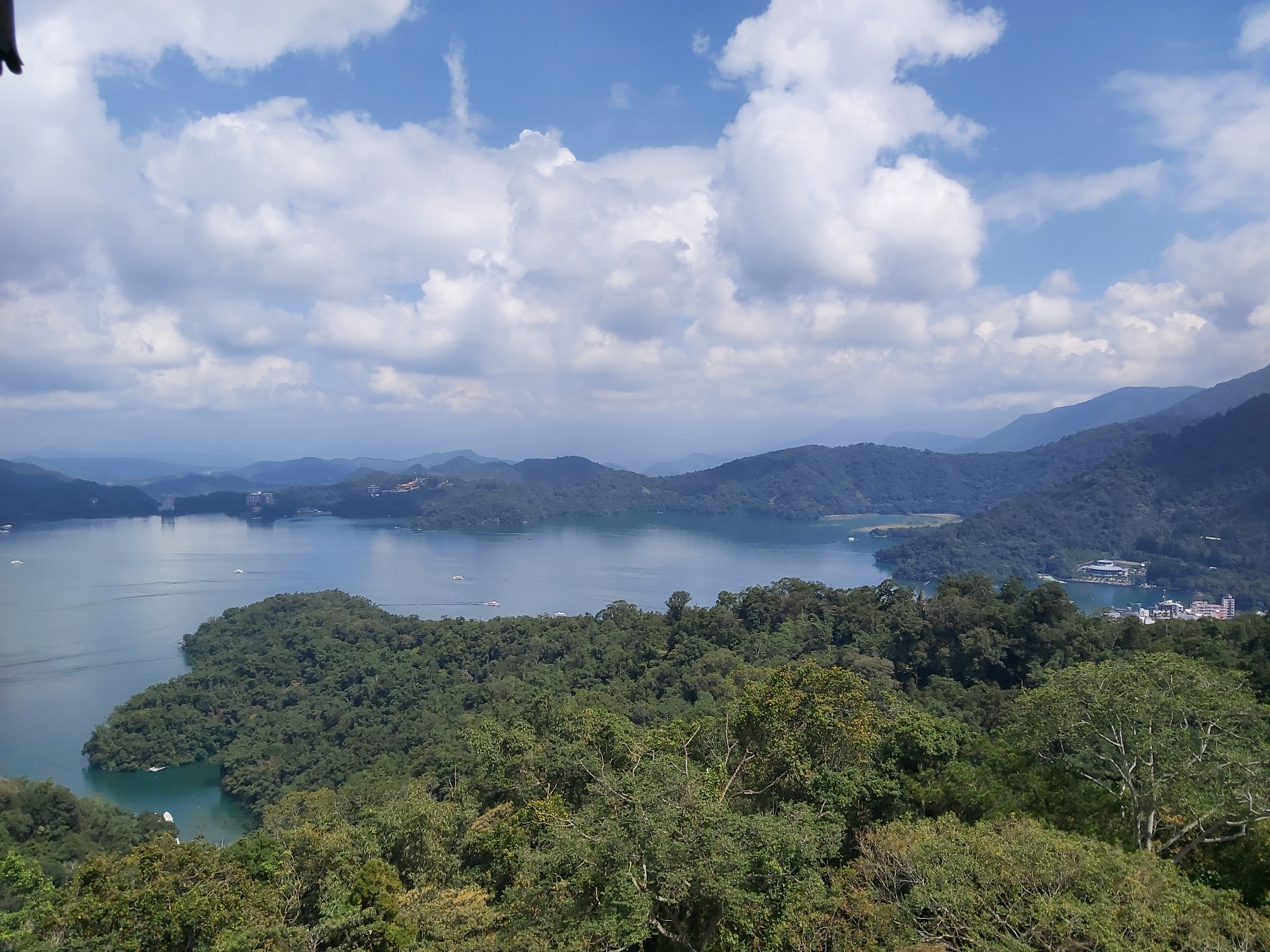

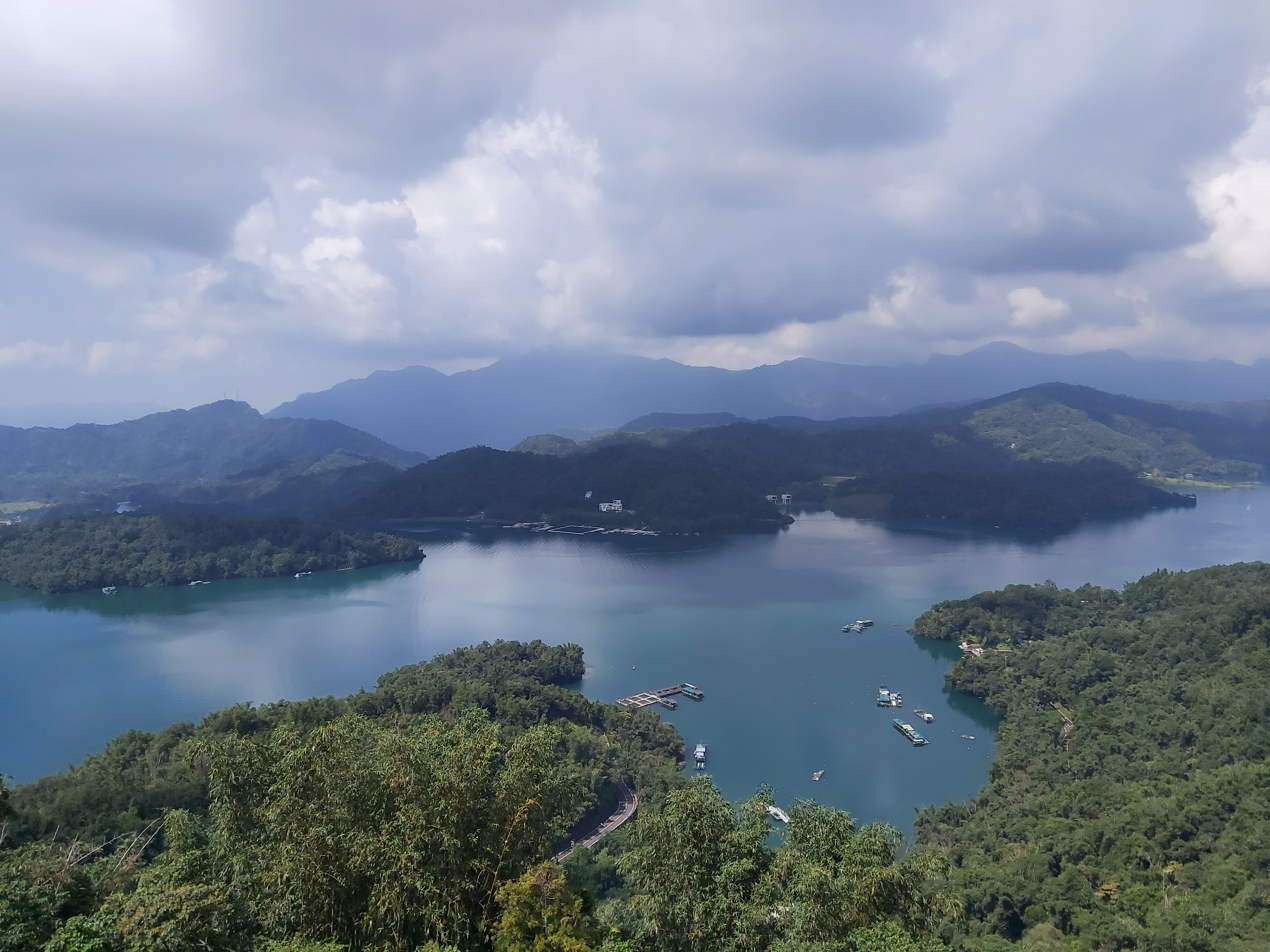

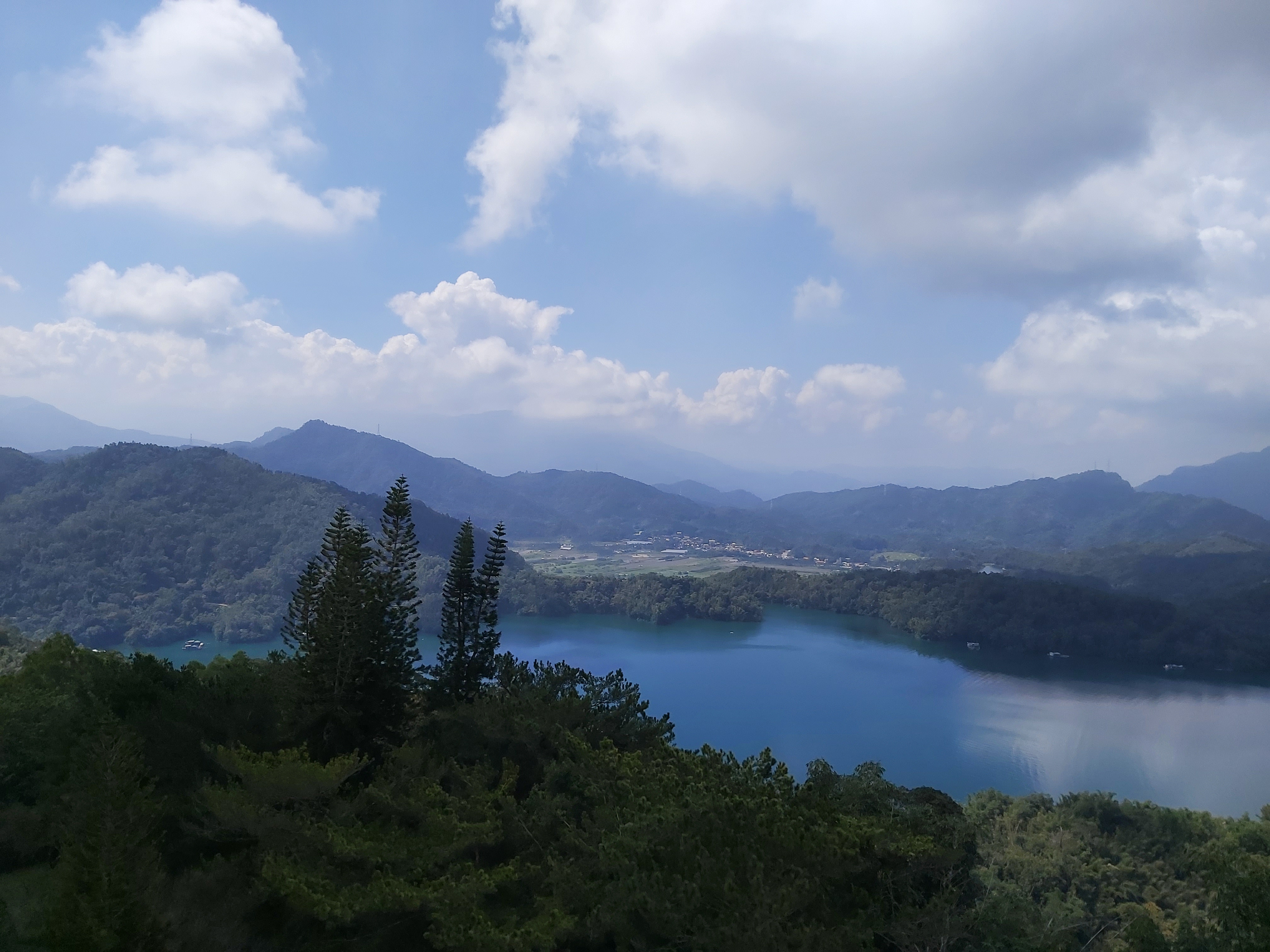

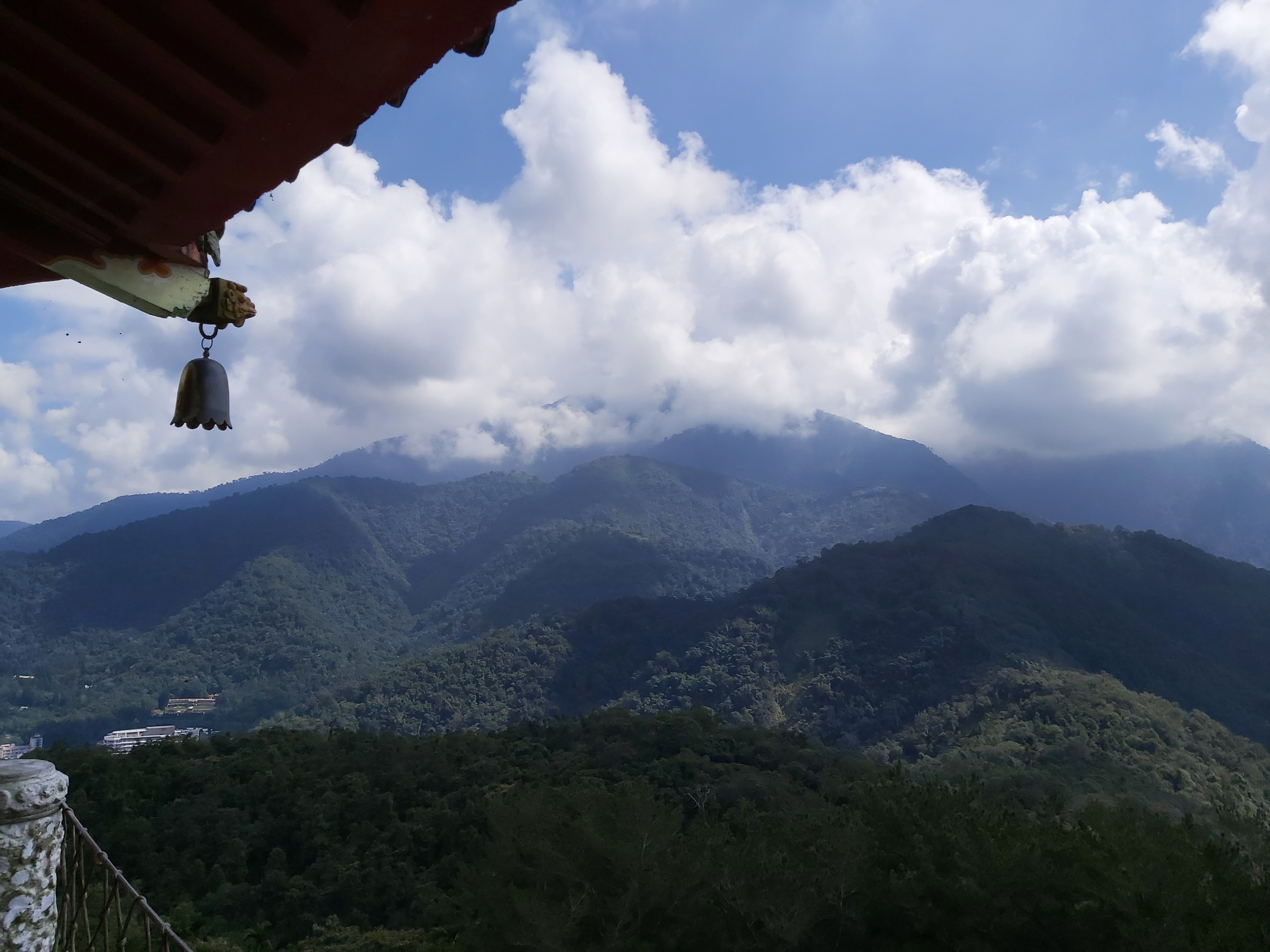

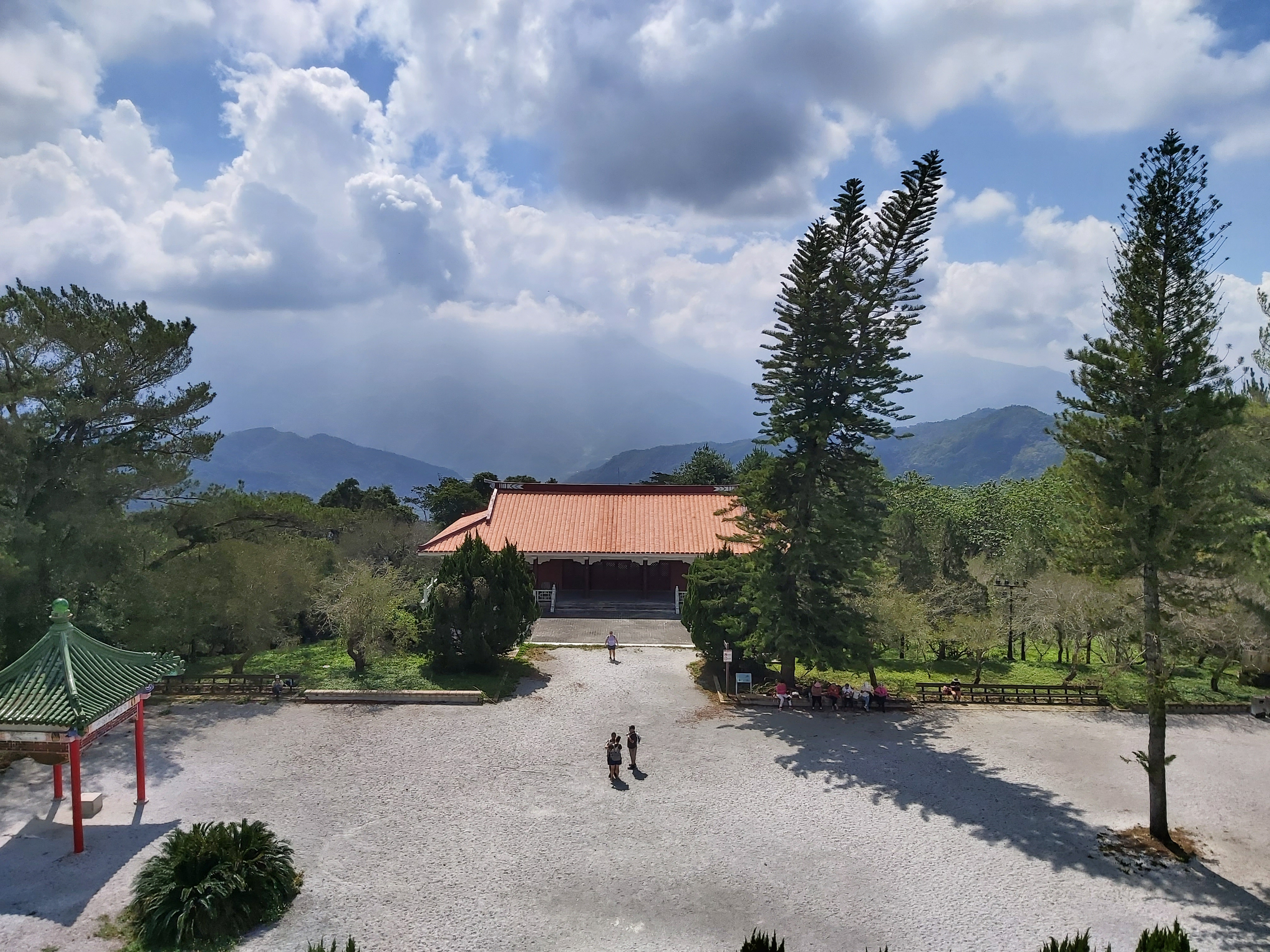

== Transportation ==
The pagoda is accessible by bus from Taichung TRA Station or Taichung HSR Station.

== See also ==
- List of tourist attractions in Taiwan

== Bibliography ==
- Wei Ming (2013). Famous Lakes in China (in English and Chinese). Huangshan, Anhui: Huangshan Publishing House. ISBN 978-7-5461-2500-8.
