= Formosan Aboriginal Culture Village =

Amusement park in Nantou County, Taiwan

Formosan Aboriginal Culture Village 九族文化村
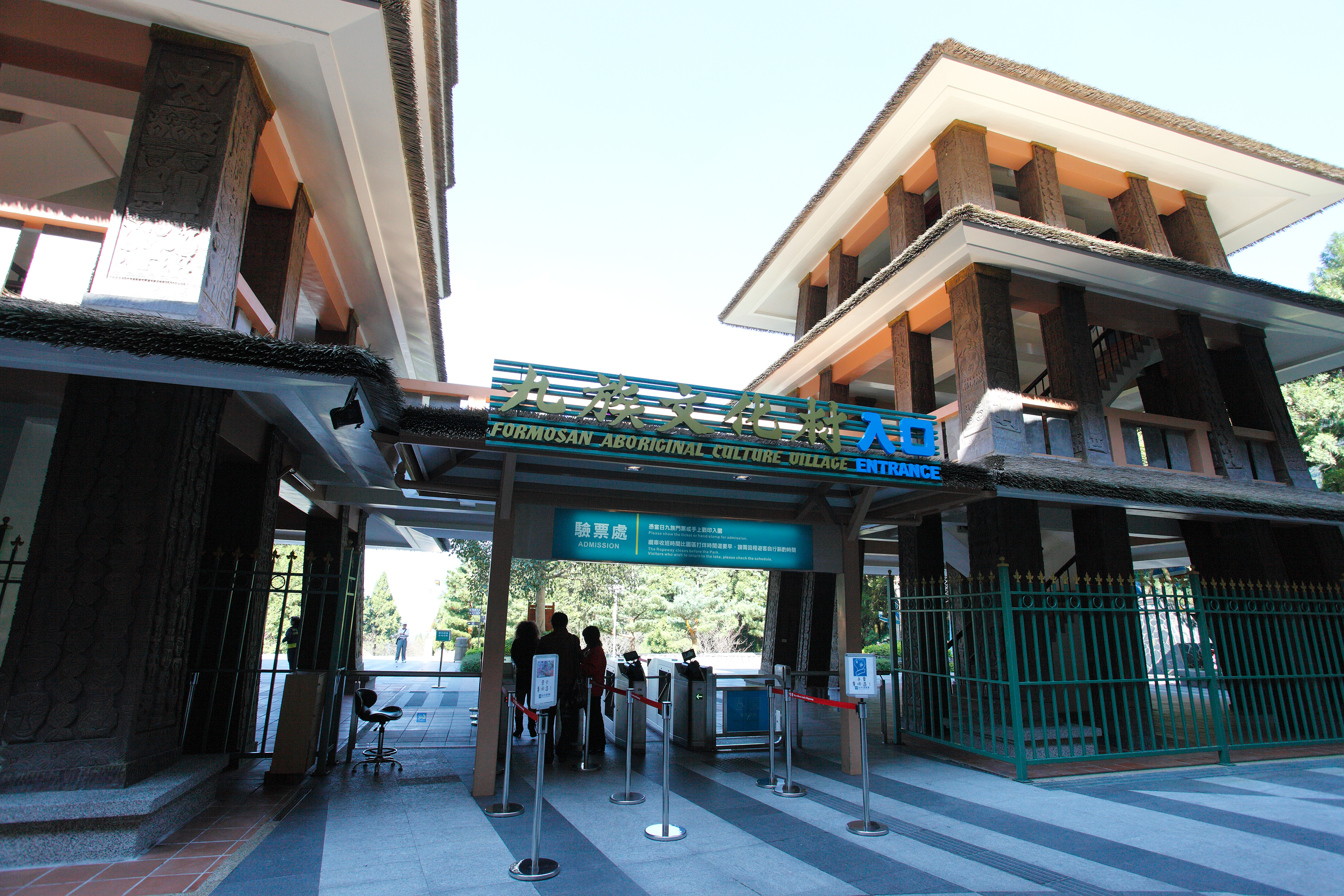
- Interactive map of Formosan Aboriginal Culture Village 九族文化村
- Location: Yuchi, Nantou County, Taiwan
- Coordinates: 23°52′05″N 120°56′52″E
- Status: Operating
- Opened: July 1986
- Area: 62 ha (150 acres)
- Website: nine.com.tw

The Formosan Aboriginal Culture Village (Chinese: 九族文化村; pinyin: Jiǔzú Wénhuà Cūn) is an amusement park in Yuchi Township, Nantou County, Taiwan which has been in operation since 1986. It is distinctive for its Formosan aboriginal culture theme. The park contains the tallest free-fall ride in Taiwan as well as Taiwan's largest European gardens and bell tower.

== History ==
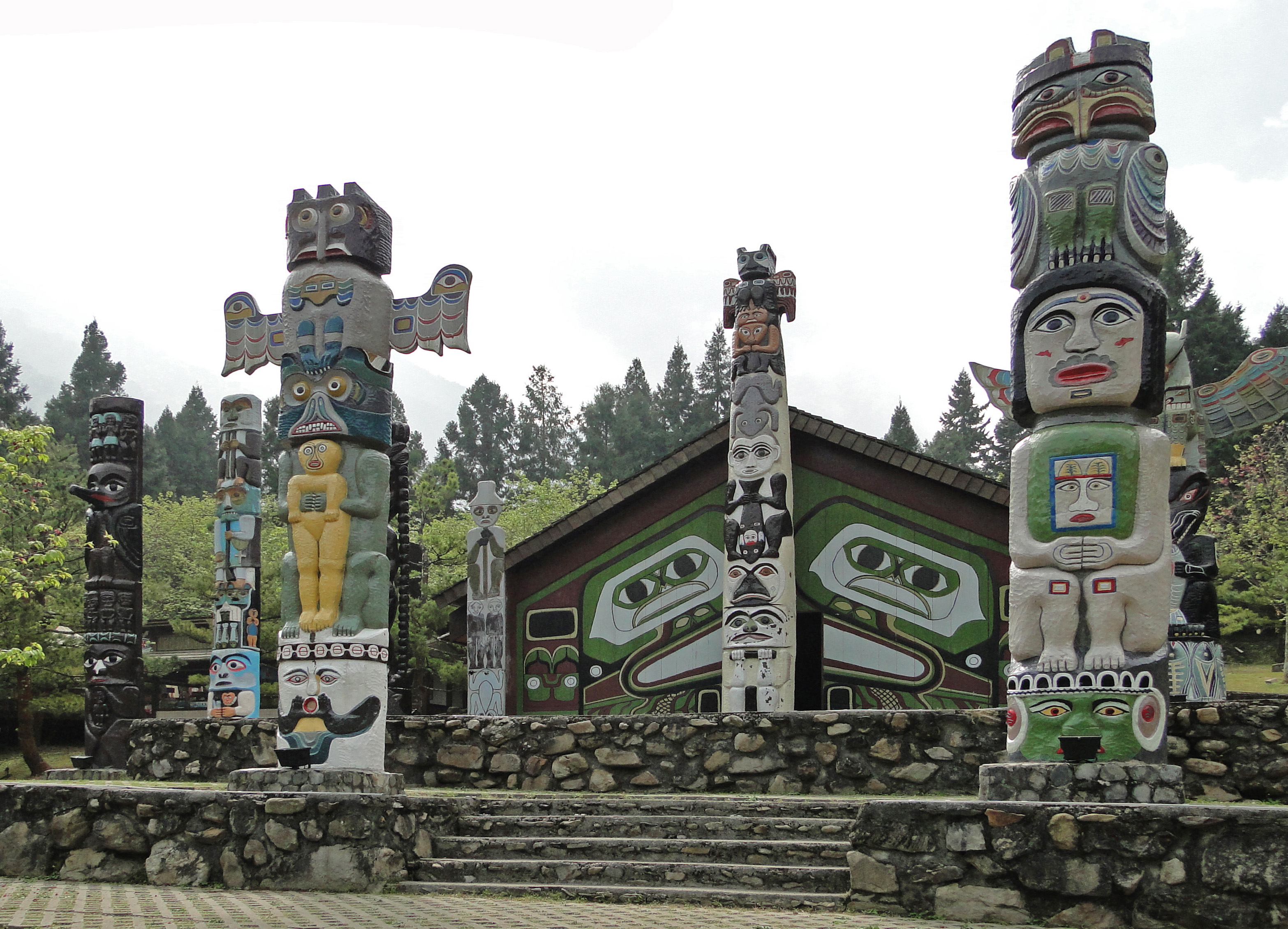
Totem Poles

The land on which the Formosan Aboriginal Culture village now stands was purchased in 1982 by the village's current president Jung-i Chang. The park was opened four years later in July 1986 with only the culture village and the European garden. The amusement park section was added in 1992.

The Formosan Aboriginal Culture Village is a place where people can observe Taiwanese traditional tribal lifestyle and observe an abundance of aboriginal traditions. The China Post has indicated that the village sprawls across 62 hectares (150 acres); a trip to the village offers visitors the chance to enjoy many educational and recreational riches and it easily requires an entire day to experience all the village has to offer. The village is an aboriginal theme park that is composed of three major areas: the Aboriginal Village Park, the Amusement Isle, and the European Garden. The outdoor atmosphere gives visitors a glimpse of aboriginal heritage in an authentic setting by depicting the villages and lifestyles of Taiwan's nine main tribes

== Rides and attractions ==
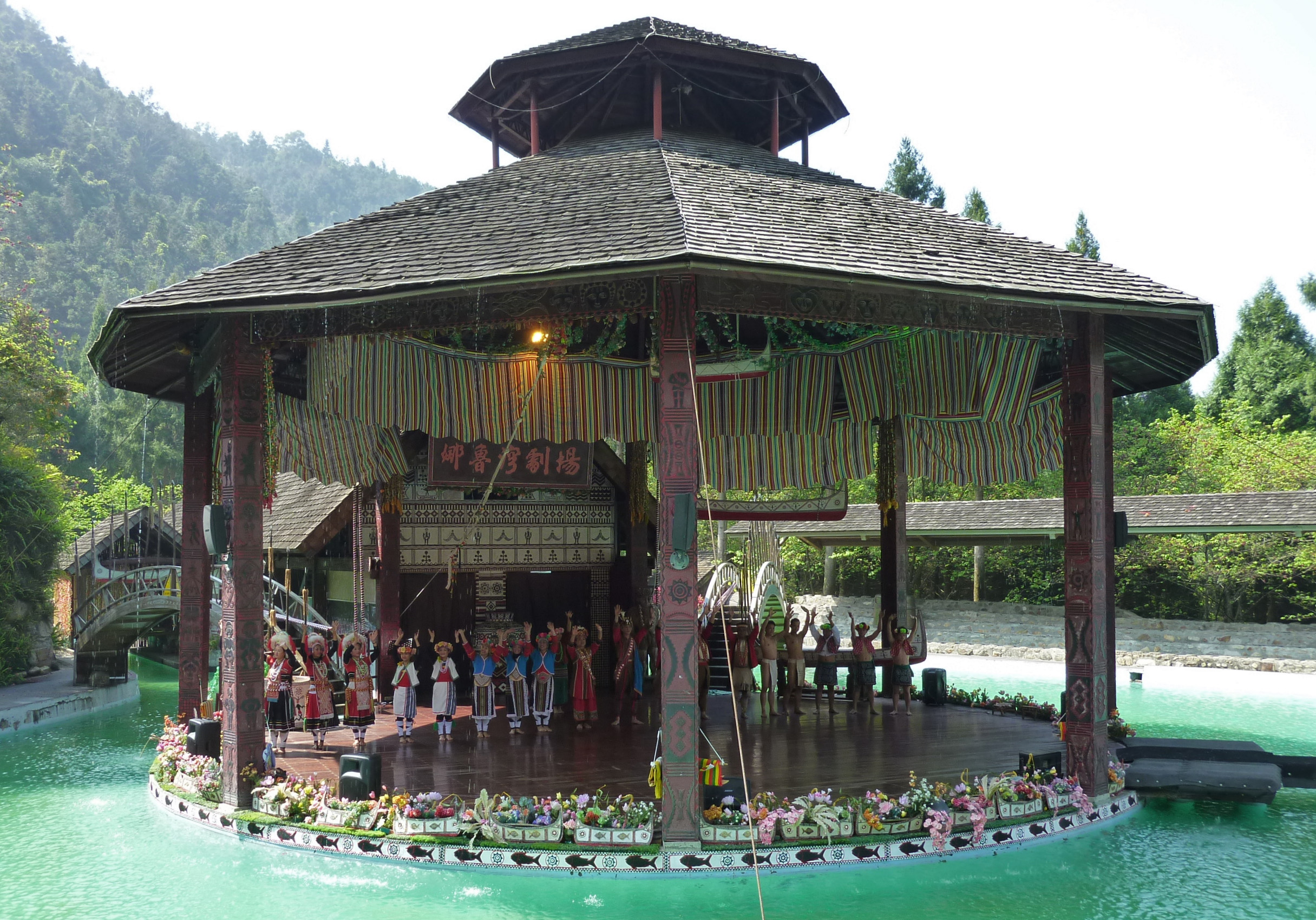
The Naruwan Theater

The park is composed of three main themed areas: the amusement park "Amusement Isle", an activities area "Aboriginal Village Park", and a European garden. All of the rides except the Gondola to the aboriginal village and the steam train are located in "Amusement Isle".

=== European Garden ===
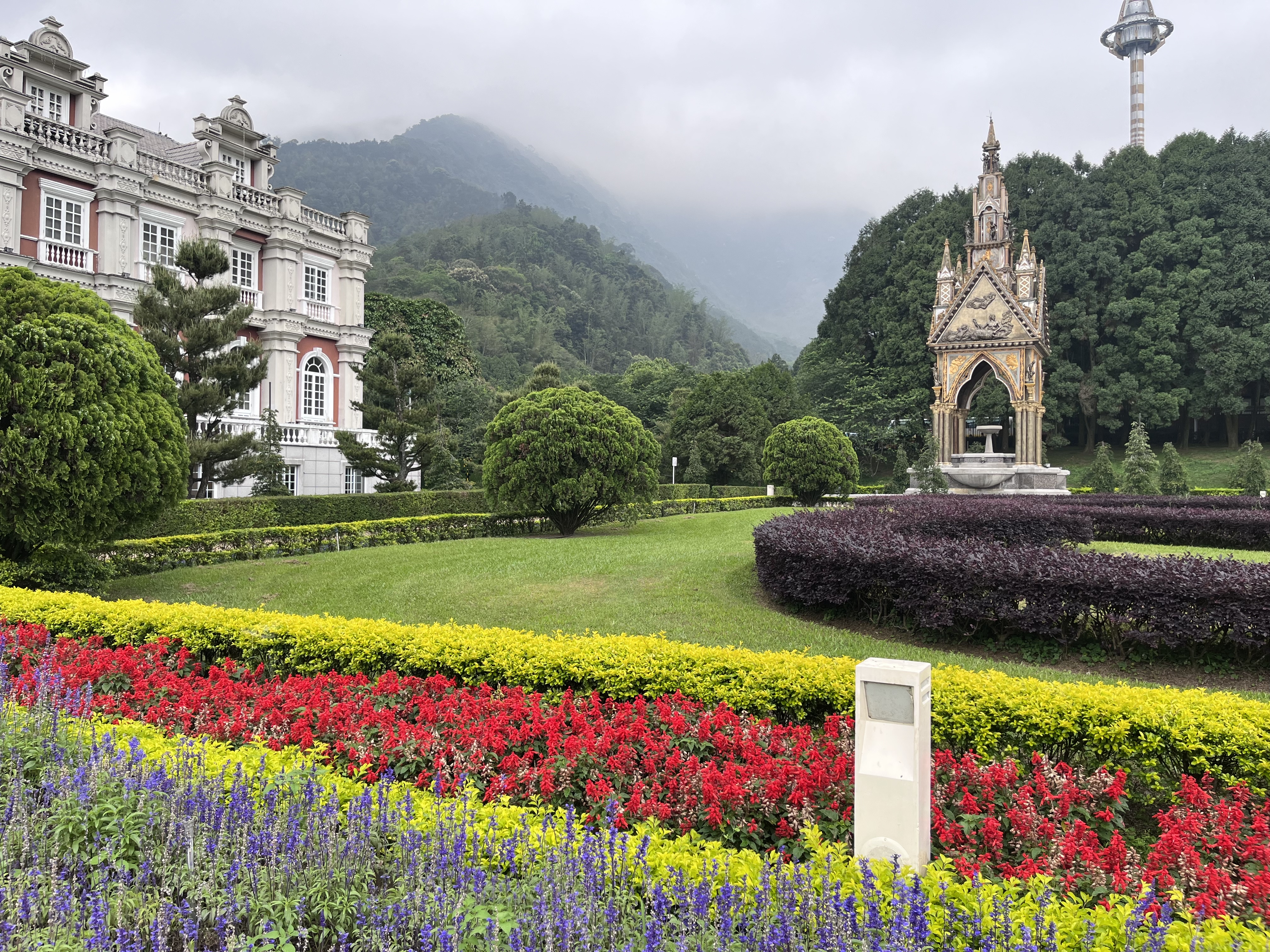
The European Garden at the park

The European Garden (traditional Chinese: 歐洲花園) is the largest European garden in Taiwan. Notable features are the gothic clock tower, the Roman fountain, the miniature train, and the Ritz palace. The garden itself has Aboriginal style patterns.

=== Aboriginal Village Park ===
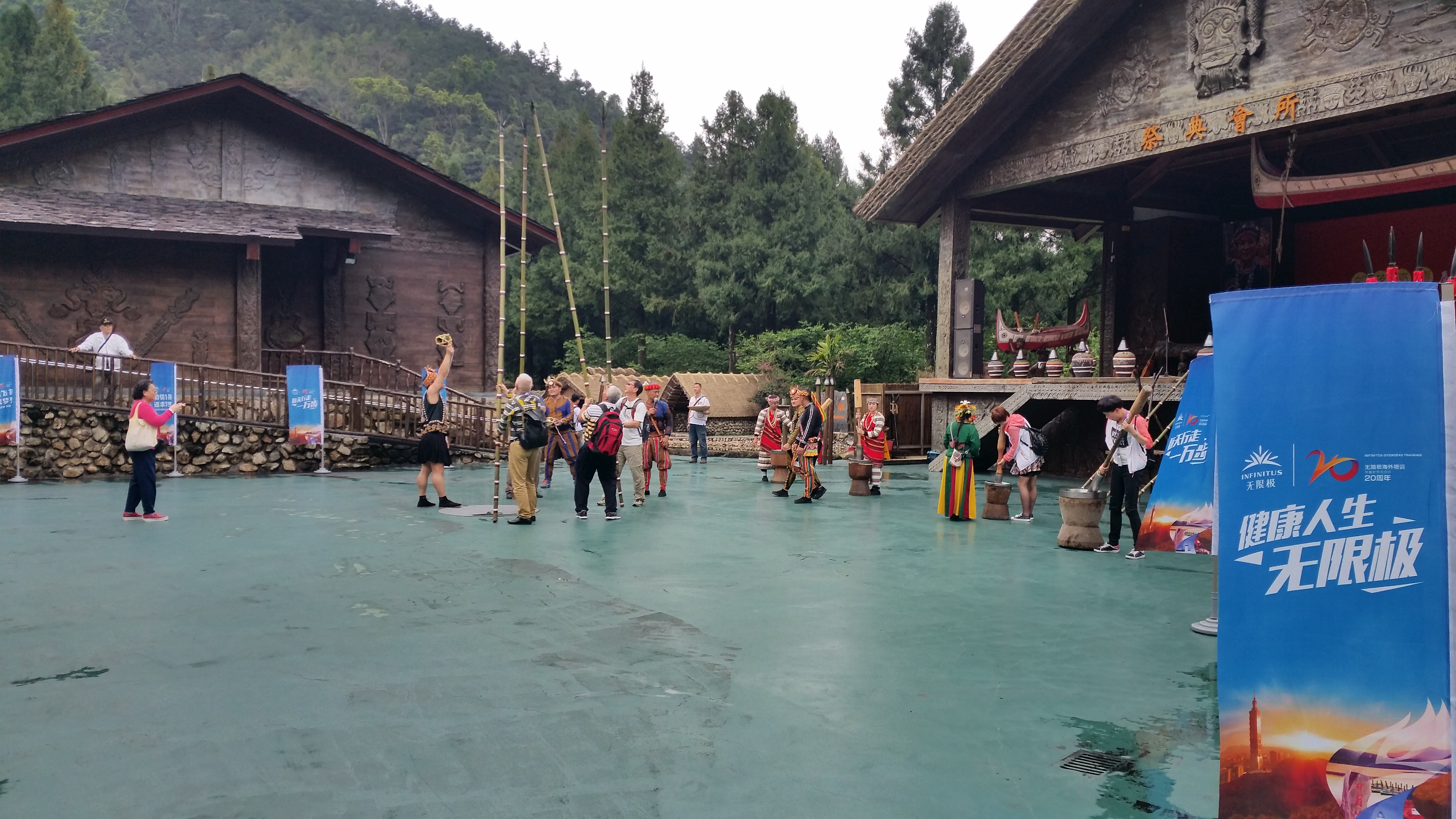
Group of tourists at the park

The Aboriginal Village Park is the largest outdoor museum in Taiwan. It is composed of nine villages on the hillside above Amusement Isle, each representing a different aboriginal tribal community. The buildings were reconstructed based on fieldwork and blueprints drawn up by anthropologists in the 1930s and 40s.

The aboriginal village employs Taiwanese aborigines from the nine tribes with whom the visitors can engage in living history. Activities include sculpting, weaving, pottery making, cooking, knitting, exercising, handicrafts making, playing, and dancing in the tradition of the aboriginal tribes.

The village represents nine aboriginal tribal cultures; it is also an amusement park that features original cultural performances, architecture, traditional clothing, hand-made crafts, etc. There are music shows and craft demonstrations in the village's Culture Square. The village also provides visitors with the opportunity to watch traditional show performers, which are all native Taiwanese aborigines, perform traditional dances representative of Taiwan's aboriginal tribes. During the shows, the performers invite audiences to participate in onstage activities, which give audiences more opportunities to get close to them and be involved in the culture.

=== Amusement Isle ===
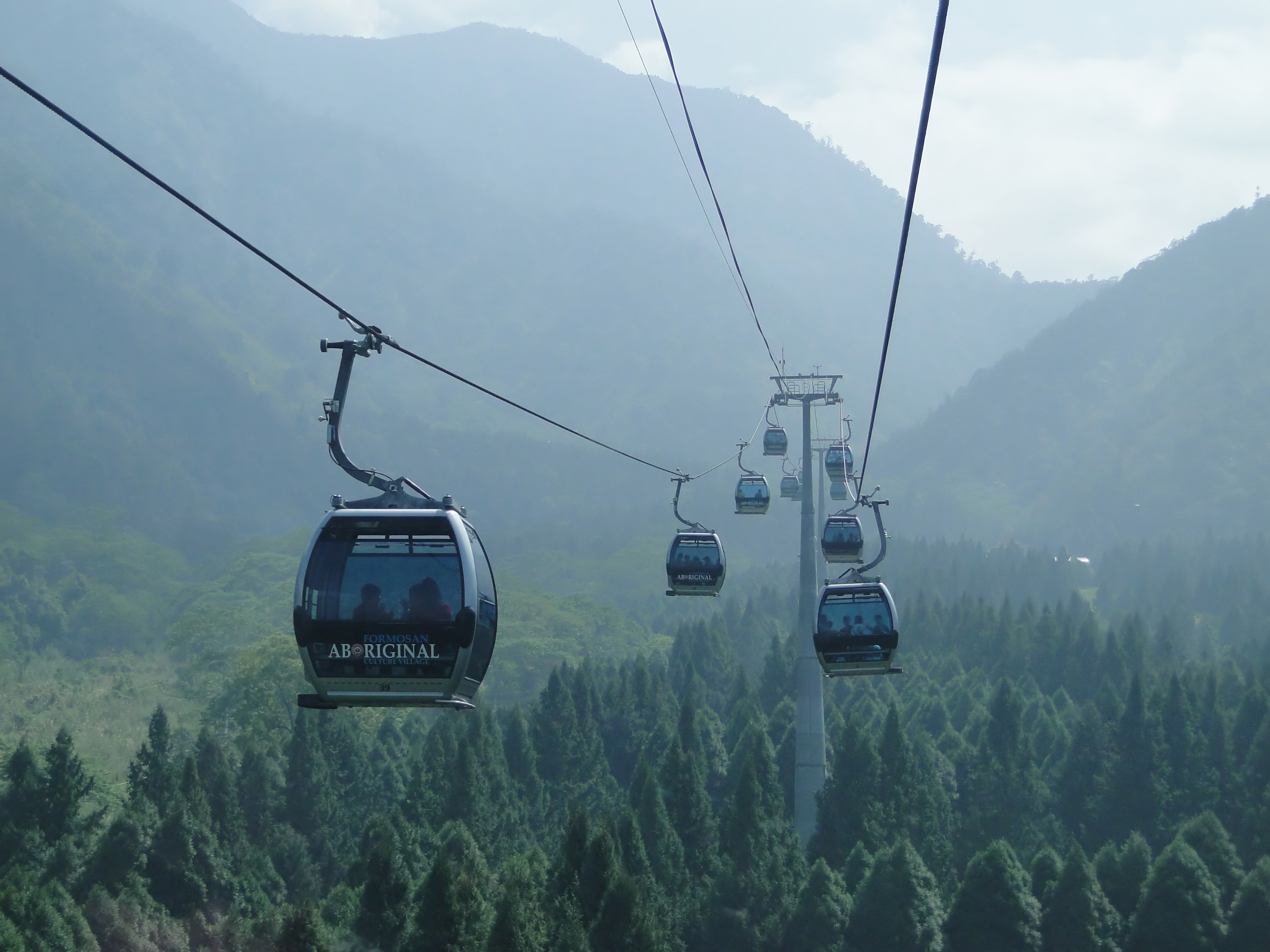
The cable car

Amusement Isle is the amusement park section of the Formosan Aboriginal Culture Village. It is located between the culture village and the European gardens and serves as an access point to the culture village via the cable car.

The park's current rides and attractions include:

- Mayan Adventure (traditional Chinese: 馬雅探險). Taiwan's first suspended roller coaster. Built by the Dutch company Vekoma for NT$600,000,000.
- UFO Adventures (traditional Chinese: UFO歷險). Taiwan's tallest free-fall ride at 280 ft (85 m). Built by Swiss company Intamin for NT$300,000,000.
- Gold Mine Exploration (traditional Chinese: 金礦山探險). A log flume ride with a 50 ft (15 m) final drop. Built by German company Mack for NT$1,000,000,000.
- Caribbean Adventure (traditional Chinese: 加勒比海探險). A water coaster consisting of a backwards section and a final drop of 100 ft (30 m). Built by German company Mack for NT$360,000,000.
- Spanish Coast (traditional Chinese: 西班牙海岸). A Gaudi architecture inspired area featuring three rides: A monorail built by Italian company Zamperla, an interactive water ride built by German company Mack and the major attraction, a rapid river ride built by German company Hafema.
- Aboriginal Ropeway (traditional Chinese: 九族空中纜車). Taiwan's first cable car system. Transports visitors from amusement isle to the aboriginal village. Built by Austrian company Doppelmayr for NT$1,000,000,000.
- Aladdin Square (traditional Chinese: 阿拉丁廣場). An indoor facility that houses various small attractions. Notable among these are Space Mountain (traditional Chinese: 太空山) similar to Disneyland's Space Mountain, and Hawaii waves (traditional Chinese: 夏威夷巨浪). Other attractions include carnival games and fair rides.

=== Cherry blossom season ===
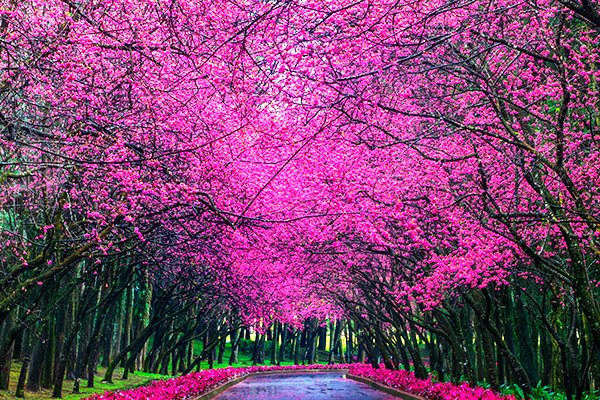
Cherry blossom season at the park.

During the cherry blossom festival period, lamplights are placed on each of the cherry trees in the Formosan Aboriginal Cultural Village.

== See also ==
- List of tourist attractions in Taiwan
