= Yuchi, Nantou =

Rural township in Nantou County, Taiwan

Coordinates: 23°54′N 120°56′E

Yuchi Township 魚池鄕
- Rural township
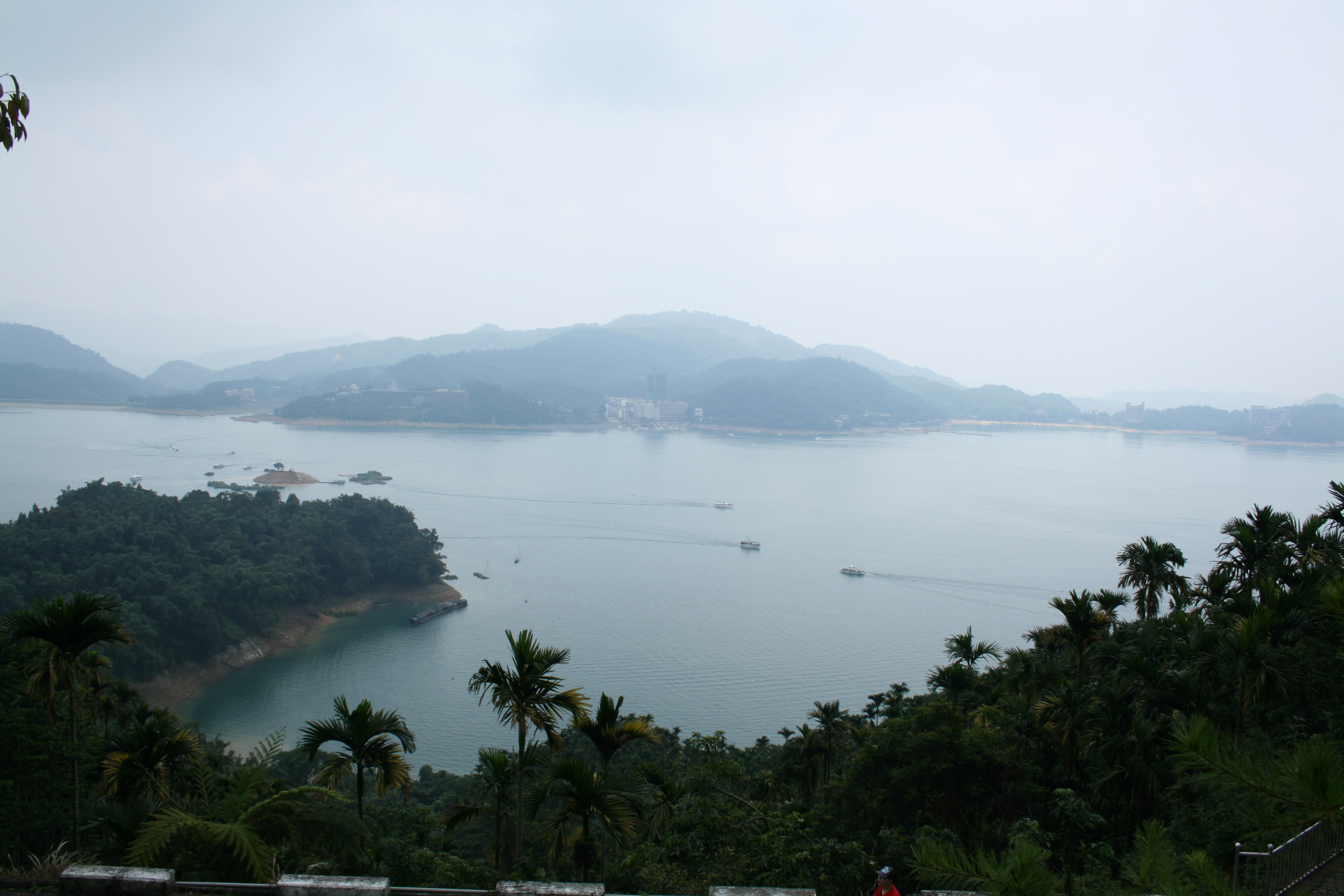
- Sun Moon Lake in Yuchi Township

- Yuchi Township in Nantou County
- Location: Nantou County, Taiwan

Area
  - Total: 121 km^{2} (47 sq mi)

Population (February 2023)
  - Total: 14,863
  - Density: 123/km^{2} (318/sq mi)

Yuchi Township
- Traditional Chinese: 魚池鄕
- Literal meaning: Fish Pond
Transcriptions
Standard Mandarin
- Hanyu Pinyin: Yúchí Xiāng
- Tongyong Pinyin: Yúchíh Siang
Southern Min
- Hokkien POJ: Hî-tî-hiong

Yuchi Township (Chinese: 魚池鄕, also known as Yuchih) is a rural township in the center of Nantou County, Taiwan. It is the location of the Sun Moon Lake, a tourist attraction.

== History ==
The area is home to the Thao people who live near Sun Moon Lake. The township was formerly called Go-sia-po (Chinese: 五城堡; Pe̍h-ōe-jī: Gō͘-siâⁿ-pó)

== Administrative divisions ==
The township comprises 13 villages: Dalin, Dayan, Gonghe, Riyue, Shuishe, Toushe, Tungchi, Tungguang, Wucheng, Wudeng, Xincheng, Yuchi and Zhongming.

== Tourist attractions ==
- Ci En Pagoda
- Formosan Aboriginal Culture Village
- Lalu Island
- Sun Moon Lake
- Wen Wu Temple
- Xuanzang Temple

== Transportation ==
- Provincial Highway No. 21 goes through Yuchi.
- Sun Moon Lake Ropeway
- Shuishe Pier

== Notable natives ==
- Lin Yang-kang, President of Judicial Yuan (1987–1994)
- Tang Huo-shen, member of Legislative Yuan (2002–2008)
