= Atactorhynchus =

Scientific classification
- Kingdom: Animalia
- Phylum: Acanthocephala
- Class: Eoacanthocephala
- Order: Neoechinorhynchida
- Family: Neoechinorhynchidae
- Genus: Atactorhynchus; Chandler, 1935

Type species
- Atactorhynchus verecundus Chandler, 1935

Other species
- Atactorhynchus duranguensis

Genus of parasitic worms

Atactorhynchus is a genus in Acanthocephala (thorny-headed worms, also known as spiny-headed worms) which contains two species, A. verecundus and A. duranguensis.

== Taxonomy ==
The genus was described by Chandler in 1935 who gave it a new genus as it was the only genera in the family Neoechinorhynchidae with more than four horizontal rows of hooks on the proboscis apart from Tanaorhamphus (which has a large and long proboscis with 20 or more transverse rows of large hooks and a body that is cylindrical or enlarged anteriorly) and Pandosentis (which has a short cylindrical proboscis with hooks that are not U-shaped but bent at right angles, very short lemnisci, and short retractor muscles). Phylogenetic analysis has been performed on A. duranguensis

== Description ==
Atactorhynchus species consist of a proboscis covered in very irregularly arranged hooks and a trunk. The proboscis is very small and armed with about eight diagonally transverse rows of hooks with about eight hooks in anterior rows, and about twice as many hooks that are half as large in the posterior rows. The hooks are U-shaped, with large rod-shaped roots and slender spines with only the tips projecting through the cuticle. The proboscis sac is about twice as long as the proboscis.

The body is small, stout, ventrally curved, with greatest diameter behind the middle. The retractor muscles for the proboscis sac are attached behind middle of body. The lemnisci are very long and large, extending about to middle of body, one containing one nucleus, the other two. The testes are large, more or less spherical ad contiguous. The syncytial cement gland, which are used to temporarily close the posterior end of the female after copulation, are in contact with testes. There is a seminal vesicle with two ducts and a well-developed cement reservoir.

== Species ==
The genus Atactorhynchus Chandler, 1935 contains two species.

- Atactorhynchus duranguensis Salgado-Maldonado, Aguilar-Aguilar and Cabañas-Carranza, 2005

A. duranguensis has been found in the intestine of the Mezquital pupfish (Cyprinodon meeki) from in-land near Durango, Mexico. The body is small, stout, ventrally curved; small cylindrical proboscis armed with 16 alternating vertical rows of four or five hooks; anterior two or three hooks are conspicuous, stout and larger than other hooks, and have large, rod-shaped roots with a markedly and abruptly enlarged base; three posterior hooks of each row are smaller and rootless; single-walled proboscis receptacle; lemnisci equal in length, elongate and robust; and cement gland syncytial, larger than testis. A. duranguensis is smaller than A. verecundus with smaller hook lengths and slightly smaller proboscis. A. duranguensis is also shaped differently: it has a proboscis shape that is not widest at the apex, and the greatest width of the trunk is in about the middle contrasting A. verecundus where the trunk is widest posteriorly, and the proportion of large apical proboscis hooks in relation to the small basal hooks is different: the basal hooks of A. verecundus are about half the size of the anterior hooks and but only about a quarter of the size in A. duranguensis. Unlike A. verecundus, the base of the roots are markedly and abruptly enlarged in the new species. Finally, the eggs of the new species are smaller (23-27 x 8-10 um) than those of A. verecundus (27-30 x 12-13 um).

- Atactorhynchus verecundus Chandler, 1935

A. verecundus was found in the intestines of about 30 to 40 percent of the sampled Sheepshead minnow (Cyprinodon variegatus) in upper parts of Galveston Bay in very large numbers in some hosts. Very few A. verecundus were found from hosts sampled near Galveston Island.

The proboscis is very small and nearly cylindrical, but slightly expanded distally, about 0.15 mm long and 0.06 mm in diameter. The proboscis is covered in hooks arranged irregularly in about eight diagonally transverse rows. The first four or five rows occupy the anterior two-thirds of proboscis, with about eight hooks each. The last two or three rows are smaller but with more hooks with the last row having about 16, which are about half the size of anterior hooks. The hooks are U-shaped, with broad, bluntly rounded roots and slender sharp points, with only the tips projecting through the cuticle. Measured from top of bend both points and roots about 18um to 19um long in hooks at the anterior end of the proboscis and only 9um to l0um long for the hooks of the posterior row.

Behind the proboscis, the body tapers posteriorly until it is bluntly rounded with the maximum diameter behind middle of body. The body contains a proboscis sac about twice length of the proboscis. The retractor muscles of the proboscis sac are long and slender and attached behind the middle of body, so that the anterior end of body can be retracted. The lemnisci are long (about half length of body) and in males terminate at about anterior margin of anterior testis.

There is sexual dimorphism in this species with the females up to 6.5 mm in length, with maximum diameter about 0.63 mm and the males up to 4.5 long, with maximum diameter of 0.6 mm. The testes (300um to 400m long and about two-thirds as wide) are in the posterior half of body and contiguous. Syncytial cement glands are just behind the testes and roughly the same in size. The cement reservoir is bag-shaped and located just behind cement gland. The seminal vesicle is rounded, dorsal to anterior end of cement reservoir, and connected with genital aperture by two ducts. In the female, the eggs in uterus are 27um to 30um long and 12um to 13um wide.

== Distribution ==
The distribution of Atactorhynchus is determined by that of its hosts. They were found in Galveston Bay and in-land near Durango.

== Hosts ==
Life cycle of Acanthocephala. (Note: There are no known aberrant human infections for Atactorhynchus species.)

The life cycle of an acanthocephalan consists of three stages beginning when an infective acanthor (development of an egg) is released from the intestines of the definitive host and then ingested by an arthropod, the intermediate host. Although the intermediate hosts of Atactorhynchus are not known, they are always an arthropod. When the acanthor molts, the second stage called the acanthella begins. This stage involves penetrating the wall of the mesenteron or the intestine of the intermediate host and growing. The final stage is the infective cystacanth which is the larval or juvenile state of an Acanthocephalan, differing from the adult only in size and stage of sexual development. The cystacanths within the intermediate hosts are consumed by the definitive host, usually attaching to the walls of the intestines, and as adults they reproduce sexually in the intestines. The acanthor is passed in the feces of the definitive host and the cycle repeats. There may be paratenic hosts (hosts where parasites infest but do not undergo larval development or sexual reproduction) for Atactorhynchus.

Atactorhynchus parasitizes animals. There are no reported cases of Atactorhynchus infesting humans in the English language medical literature.

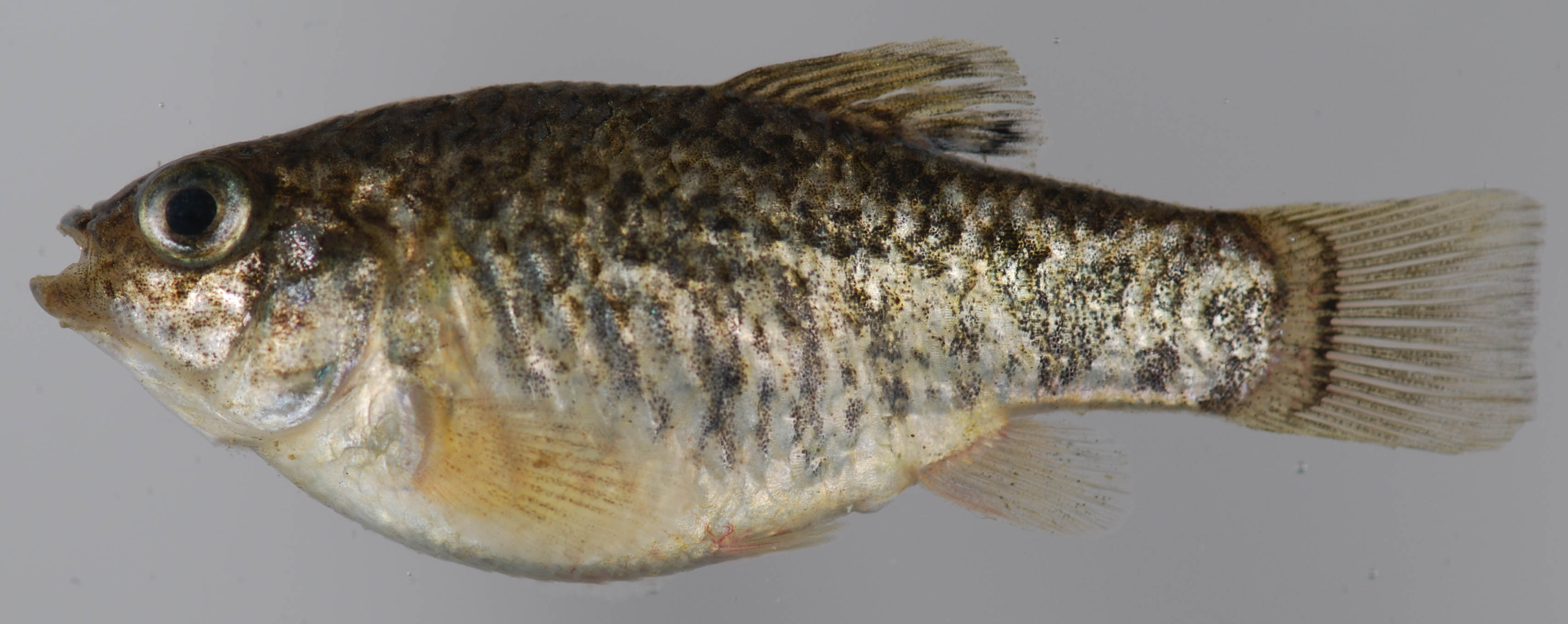
The Sheepshead minnow is a host for A. verecundus.
