= Dendronucleata =

Scientific classification
- Kingdom: Animalia
- Phylum: Acanthocephala
- Class: Eoacanthocephala
- Order: Neoechinorhynchida
- Family: Dendronucleatidae; Sokolovskaja, 1962
- Genus: Dendronucleata; Sokolovskaia, 1962

Genus of thorny-headed worms

Dendronucleata is a genus of small parasitic spiny-headed (or thorny-headed) worms. It is the only genus in the family Dendronucleatidae. This genus contains three species that are distributed globally, being collected in North America and Asia. The distinguishing features of this genus among Archiacanthocephalans is the presence of randomly distributed dendritically branched giant hypodermic nuclei. Dendronucleata parasitize freshwater fish and a salamander by attaching themselves in the intestines using their hook covered proboscis and adhesives secreted from cement glands.

== Taxonomy ==
Dendronucleatidae is a monotypic family created by Sokolovskaya in 1962 to accommodate the only genus, Dendronucleata, which contains two species, D. dogieli and D. petruschewskii. More recently, it is hypothesized that D. dogieli and D. petruschewskii might be conspecific. The National Center for Biotechnology Information does not indicate that any phylogenetic analysis has been published on Dendronucleata that would confirm its position as a unique order in the order Neoechinorhynchida.

== Description ==
The general appearance, shape of proboscis and number and arrangement of proboscis hooks of the Dendronucleatidae are similar to members of Neoechinorhynchus of the family Neoechinorhynchidae, Dendronucleatidae have randomly distributed dendritically branched giant hypodermic nuclei from which it derives its name.

== Species ==
There are three known species of Dendronucleatidae.

- Dendronucleata americana Moravec and Huffman, 2000

D. americana has been found in the intestine infecting around 5% of the Texas blind salamanders (Typhlomolge rathbuni) sampled in San Marcos (Artesian well at Freeman Aquatic Station), Hays County in central Texas, United States. The intermediate host is likely an ostracods. The species name was derived from America, the continent where it was found. The body is spindle-shaped or cylindrical, ventrally curved. Dendritically branched giant hypodermic nuclei irregularly scattered in body wall of entire trunk. Each lemniscus containing 1-3 rounded giant nuclei. Proboscis spheroid, armed with 18-24 hooks arranged in 6 spiral rows. Cephalic ganglion in posterior part of proboscis receptacle. The testes are near the end, have 1-2 giant nuclei in lemnisci and have eggs 0.033-0.036 mm long.

The body is long and broader anteriorly with an indistinct or very short neck. The male is significantly smaller than the female. The male has a trunk length of between 1.945 and 2.965 mm (female: 3.155-3.944 mm) with a maximum width between 0.367 and 0.462 mm (female: 0.435-0.517mm). There are 6-7 dendritically branched giant hypodermic nuclei: two anterior most giant nuclei situated subdorsally and subventrally at the same level, forming a pair; few nuclei clearly coupled closely to one another. The small proboscis spheroid, armed with hooks arranged in six spiral rows of three hooks each. Size of hooks vary in length but are similar in both sexes with the anterior hooks being between 0.039 and 0.045 mm long, middle hooks 0.012 mm long, and posterior hooks 0.009-0.012 mm long. Proboscis receptacle short, with cephalic ganglion at its base. The proboscis in the male is 0.109-0.122 mm long (female: 0.109-0.136 mm) and 0.136 mm wide (same in female). The proboscis receptacle is 0.150-0.272 mm long (female 0.177-0.286 mm) and 0.095-0.109 mm wide (female: 0.122-0.136 mm).

Lemnisci relatively short, one bearing two simple, rounded giant nuclei, another one with only one giant nucleus; all nuclei located in anterior halves of lemnisci. The lemnisci are 0.408-0.530 mm (female: 0.612-0.884 mm) and 0.449-0.666 mm long (female: 0.816-0.966 mm) and 0.054-0.095 mm (female: 0.068-0.095 mm) and 0.068-0.109 mm wide (female: 0.068-0.109 mm).

The testes are almost spherical, tandem, situated at the posterior quarter of trunk; anterior testis 0.204-0.218 × 0.177-0.218 (0.204 × 0.177), posterior testis 0.204- 0.218 × 0.190-0.231 (0.204 × 0.190). Cement gland syncytial, with several distinct nuclei, forming almost spherical mass below posterior testis. The cement glands are 0.136-0.163 mm long and 0.150-0.163 mm wide. The bell-shaped bursa is 0.163-0.245 mm long and 0.163- 0.177 mm wide. In the female, the body cavity is filled with small ovarian balls 0.045-0.054mm in diameter. The spherical vaginal sphincter is distinct and the gonopore is terminal.

- Dendronucleata dogieli Sokolovskaia, 1962

D. dogieli has been found in freshwater cyprinid fishes in the Amur river, Russia. There are 4 hooks in each spiral row and about 20 dendritically branched giant hypodermic nuclei. The testes are mid-body, have 2-3 giant nuclei in lemnisci and have eggs 0.041-0.044 mm long. It is the type species. A sample of fish from Zarrineh River, Iran found that 41.75% Capoeta capoeta and 11.25% of Common dace (Leuciscus leuciscus) were infected. It was found in the Common carp (Cyprinus carpio) in Vietnam.

- Dendronucleata petruschewskii Sokolovskaia, 1962

D. petruschewskii has been found in freshwater cyprinid fishes in the Amur river, Russia. There are 4 hooks in each spiral row and about 20 dendritically branched giant hypodermic nuclei. The testes are mid-body, have 2-3 giant nuclei in lemnisci and have eggs 0.041-0.044 mm long. It has also been found infecting eight species of cyprinid and bagrid fishes from North Vietnam including: the Mud carp (Cirrhinus molitorella), the Sharpbelly (Hemiculter leucisculus), Opsariichthys uncirostris, the Barbel chub (Squaliobarbus curriculus), Gymnostomus lepturus, the Black Amur bream (Megalobrama terminalis), Pseudobagrus vachelli and Hemibagrus elongatus. This parasite may be a junior synonym of D. dogieli.

== Distribution ==
The distribution of Dendronucleata species is determined by that of its hosts. Dendronucleata species have been found in North America (Texas), Russia (Amur River), Iran and Vietnam.

== Hosts ==
Life cycle of Acanthocephala. (Note: There are no known aberrant human infections for Dendronucleatidae species.)

The life cycle of an acanthocephalan consists of three stages beginning when an infective acanthor (development of an egg) is released from the intestines of the definitive host and then ingested by an arthropod, the intermediate host. The intermediate hosts of most Dendronucleatidae species are not known but likely an Ostracod. When the acanthor molts, the second stage called the acanthella begins. This stage involves penetrating the wall of the mesenteron or the intestine of the intermediate host and growing. The final stage is the infective cystacanth which is the larval or juvenile state of an Acanthocephalan, differing from the adult only in size and stage of sexual development. The cystacanths within the intermediate hosts are consumed by the definitive host, usually attaching to the walls of the intestines, and as adults they reproduce sexually in the intestines. The acanthor are passed in the feces of the definitive host and the cycle repeats.

Dendronucleatidae species parasitize freshwater fish and a salamander. There are no reported cases of any Dendronucleata species infesting humans in the English language medical literature.

Hosts for Dendronucleatidae species

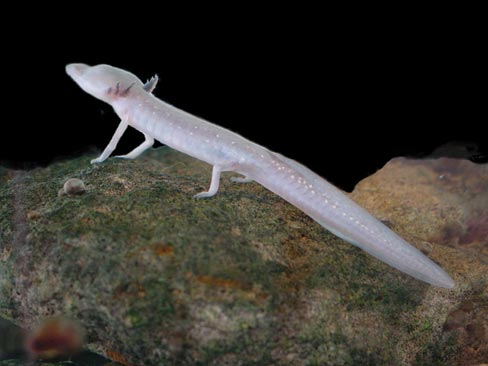
The Texas blind salamander is the host of D. americana

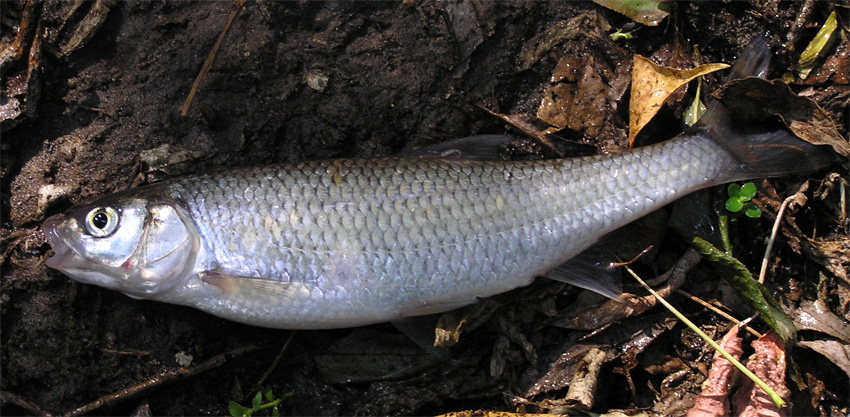
The Common dace is a host of D. dogieli

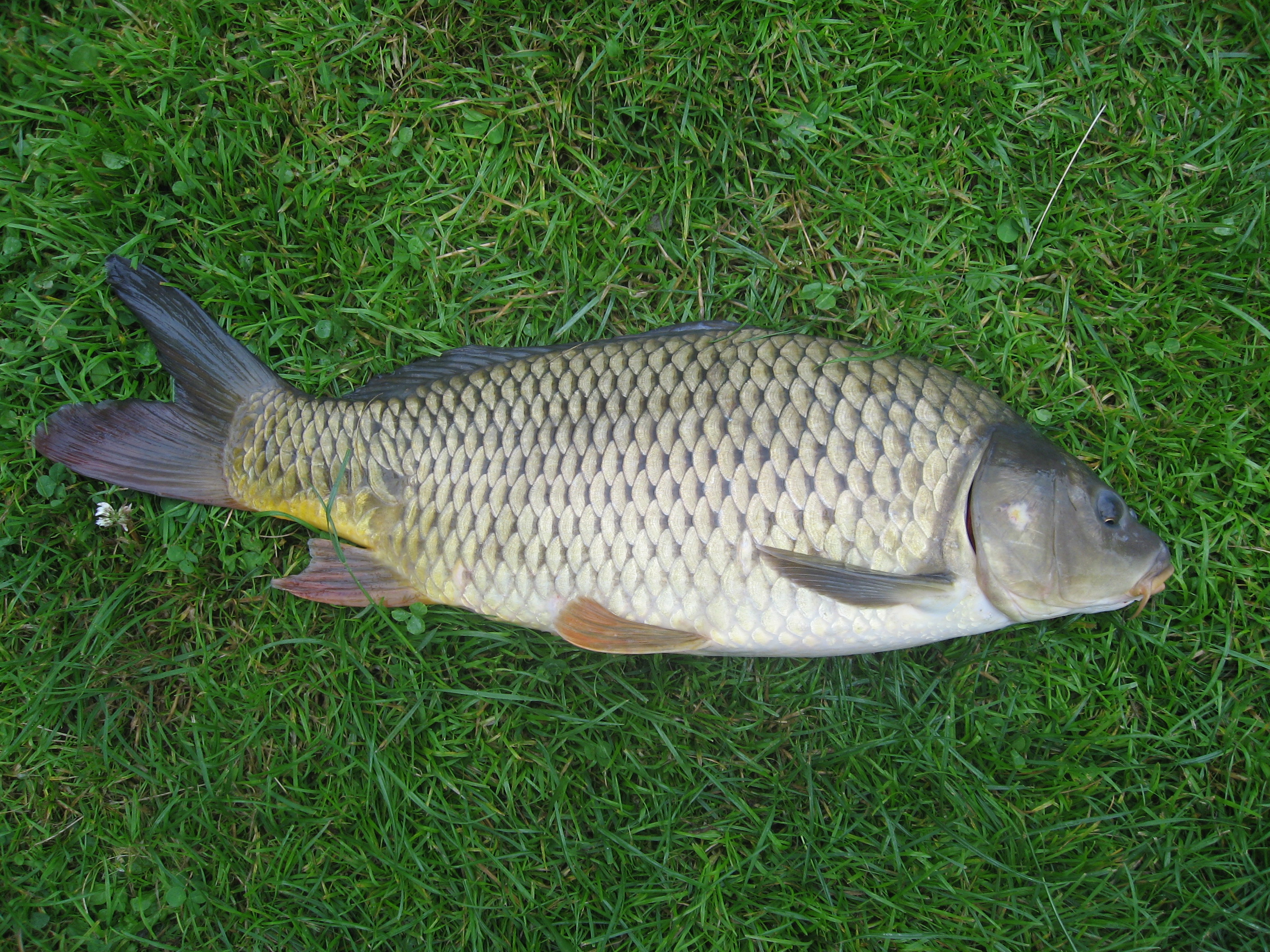
The Common carp is a host of D. dogieli

The Sharpbelly is a host of D. petruschewskii

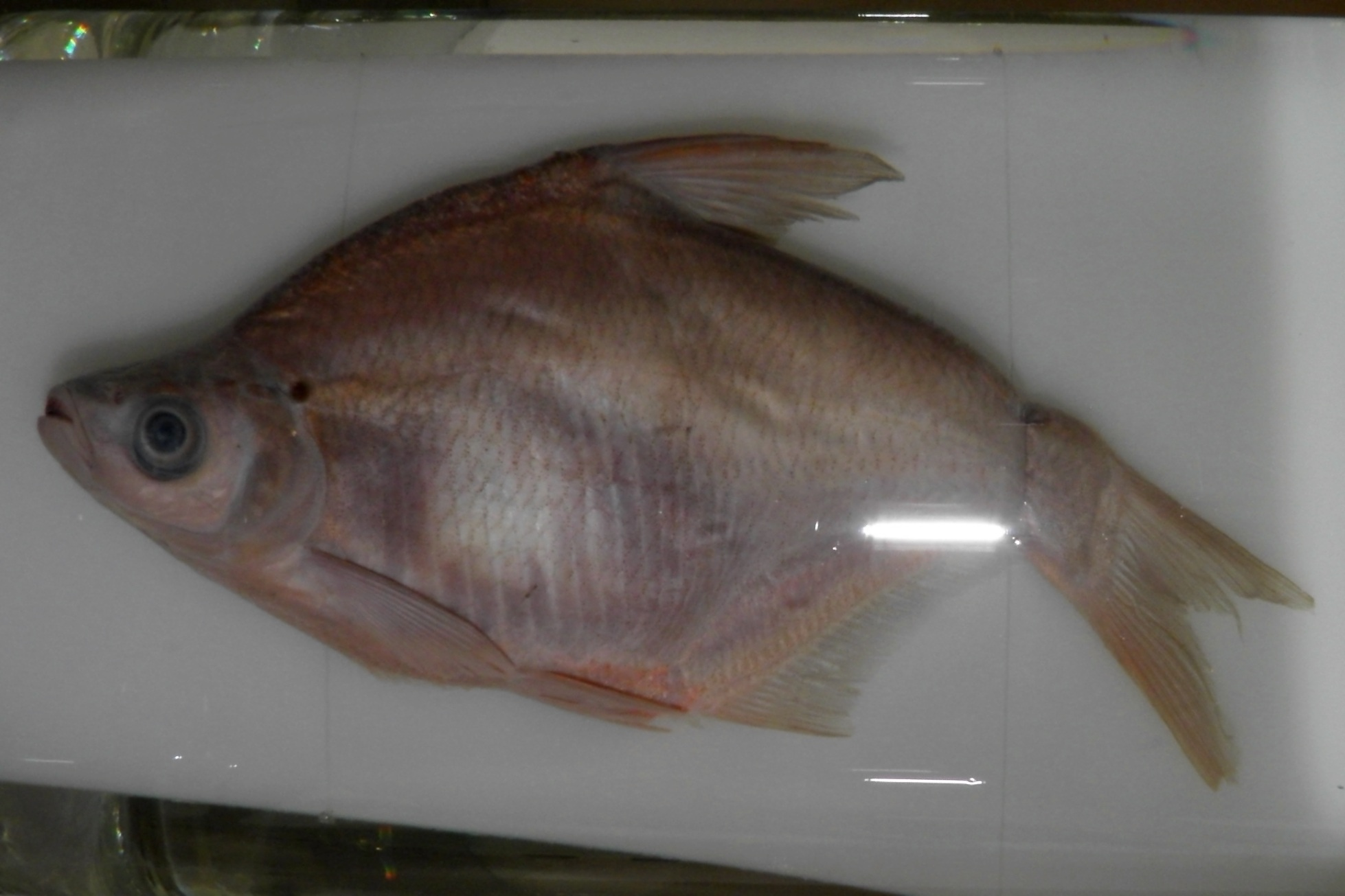
The Black Amur bream is a host of D. petruschewskii

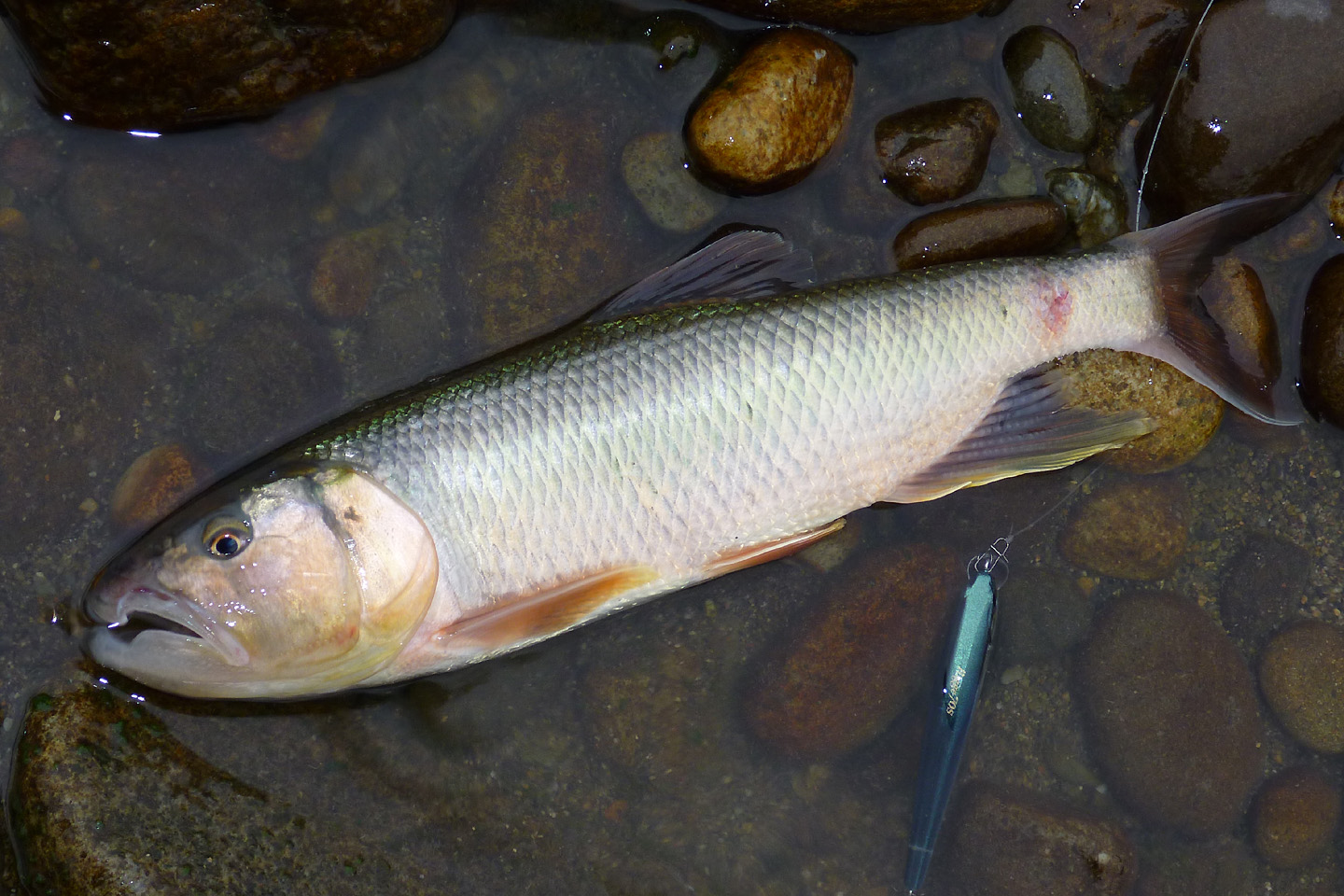
Opsariichthys uncirostris is the host of D. petruschewskii

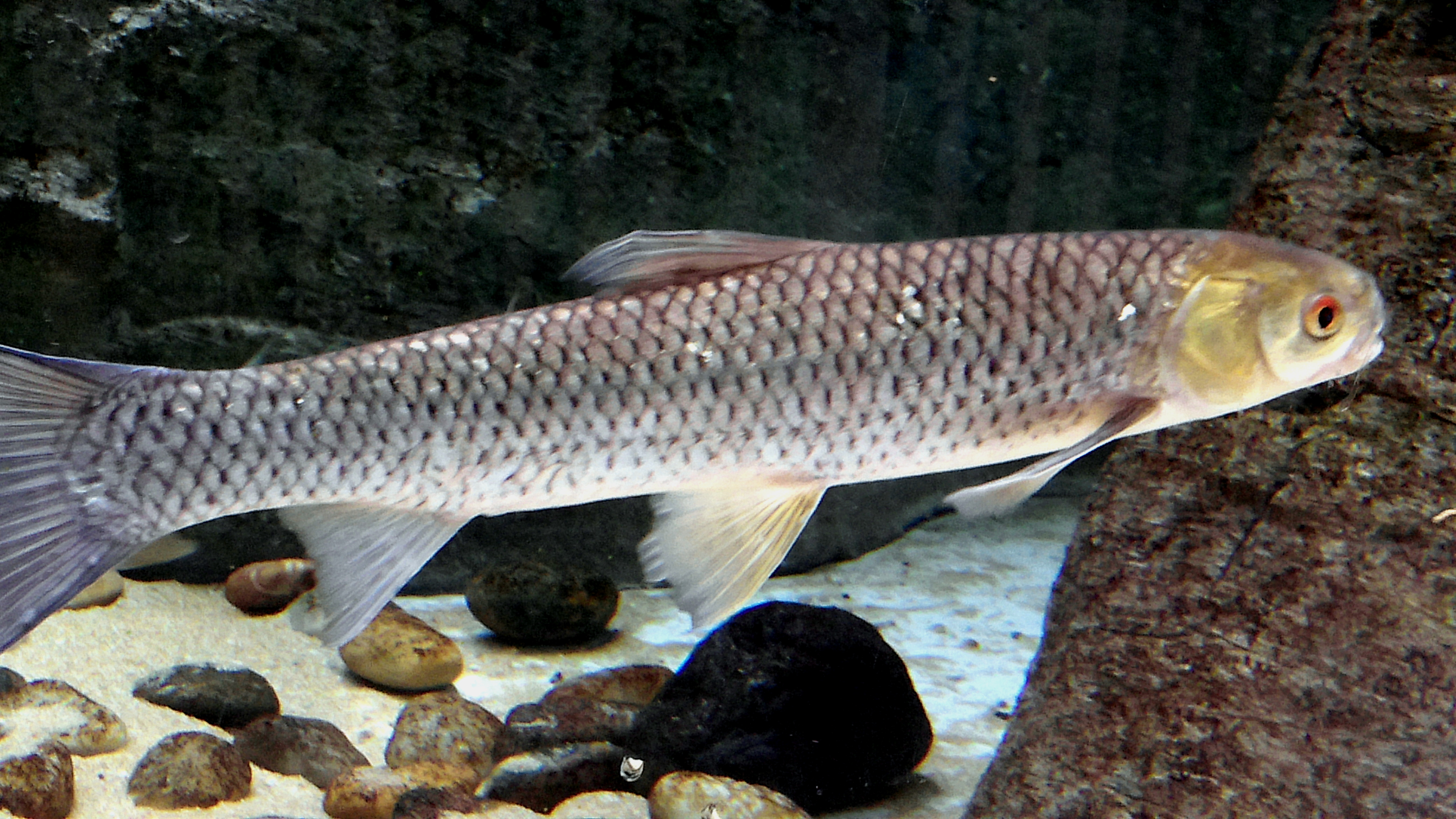
The Barbel chub is the host of D. petruschewskii
