= Mayarhynchus =

Scientific classification
- Kingdom: Animalia
- Phylum: Acanthocephala
- Class: Eoacanthocephala
- Order: Neoechinorhynchida
- Family: Neoechinorhynchidae
- Genus: Mayarhynchus; Pinacho-Pinacho, Hernández-Orts, Sereno-Uribe, Pérez-Ponce de León & García-Varela, 2017
- Species: M. karlae

Binomial name
- Mayarhynchus karlae Pinacho-Pinacho, Hernández-Orts, Sereno-Uribe, Pérez-Ponce de León & García-Varela, 2017

Genus of parasitic worms

Mayarhynchus is a monotypic genus of acanthocephalans (thorny-headed or spiny-headed parasitic worms) containing a single species, Mayarhynchus karlae, that infests animals.

== Taxonomy ==
The species was described by Pinacho-Pinacho, Hernández-Orts, Sereno-Uribe, Pérez-Ponce de León & García-Varela om 2017. It is different from the other 17 genera in Neoechinorhynchidae by having a small proboscis. It has nine longitudinal rows of five hooks each, totaling 45 to 46 relatively weak rooted hooks. Phylogenetic analysis has been conducted based on the cox1 gene, and the 28S ribosomal RNA gene were conducted to compare with other species of Neoechinorhynchidae, confirming its correct family, however it determined that Neoechynorhynchus is not monophyletic.

== Description ==
M. karlae has a small proboscis with nine longitudinal rows of five hooks each, totaling 45 to 46 relatively weak rooted hooks and a proboscis receptacle is nearly cylindrical and contains a single layered wall. The worm has a short trunk with a body wall containing five dorsal and one ventral giant hypodermal nuclei. The lemnisci are broad and flat with large nuclei. In the male, the testes are in tandem, and the cement gland has eight large nuclei. In the female, the eggs are oval.

== Distribution ==
The distribution of M. karlae is determined by that of its hosts. It is found in South-East Mexico.

== Hosts ==
Life cycle of Acanthocephala. (Note: There are no known aberrant human infections for M. karlae species.)

The life cycle of an acanthocephalan consists of three stages beginning when an infective acanthor (development of an egg) is released from the intestines of the definitive host and then ingested by an arthropod, the intermediate host. Although the intermediate hosts of Mayarhynchus are ???. When the acanthor molts, the second stage called the acanthella begins. This stage involves penetrating the wall of the mesenteron or the intestine of the intermediate host and growing. The final stage is the infective cystacanth which is the larval or juvenile state of an Acanthocephalan, differing from the adult only in size and stage of sexual development. The cystacanths within the intermediate hosts are consumed by the definitive host, usually attaching to the walls of the intestines, and as adults they reproduce sexually in the intestines. The acanthor are passed in the feces of the definitive host and the cycle repeats. There may be paratenic hosts (hosts where parasites infest but do not undergo larval development or sexual reproduction) for Mayarhynchus.

M. karlae parasitizes animals. There are no reported cases of M. karlae infesting humans in the English language medical literature.

Hosts for Mayarhynchus karlae
