= Zeylanechinorhynchus =

Scientific classification
- Kingdom: Animalia
- Phylum: Acanthocephala
- Class: Eoacanthocephala
- Order: Neoechinorhynchida
- Family: Neoechinorhynchidae
- Genus: Zeylanechinorhynchus; Fernando & Furtado, 1963
- Species: Z. longinuchalis

Binomial name
- Zeylanechinorhynchus longinuchalis Fernando & Furtado, 1963

Synonyms
- Zeylonechinorhynchus Fernando and Furtado, 1963

Monotypic genus of worms

Zeylanechinorhynchus is a monotypic genus of acanthocephalans (thorny-headed or spiny-headed parasitic worms) belonging to the family Neoechinorhynchidae. The only species is Zeylanechinorhynchus longinuchalis.

== Taxonomy ==
The species was described by Fernando & Furtado in 1963. The National Center for Biotechnology Information does not indicate that any phylogenetic analysis has been published on Zeylanechinorhynchus that would confirm its position as a unique genus in the family Neoechinorhynchidae.

== Description ==
Zeylanechinorhynchus consists of a proboscis covered in hooks and a long trunk.

== Distribution ==
The distribution of Zeylanechinorhynchus is determined by that of its hosts. The species is found in Sri Lanka.

== Hosts ==
Life cycle of Acanthocephala. (Note: There are no known aberrant human infections for Zeylanechinorhynchus species.)

The life cycle of an acanthocephalan consists of three stages beginning when an infective acanthor (development of an egg) is released from the intestines of the definitive host and then ingested by an arthropod, the intermediate host. Although the intermediate hosts of Zeylanechinorhynchus are arthropods. When the acanthor molts, the second stage called the acanthella begins. This stage involves penetrating the wall of the mesenteron or the intestine of the intermediate host and growing. The final stage is the infective cystacanth which is the larval or juvenile state of an Acanthocephalan, differing from the adult only in size and stage of sexual development. The cystacanths within the intermediate hosts are consumed by the definitive host, usually attaching to the walls of the intestines, and as adults they reproduce sexually in the intestines. The acanthor is passed in the feces of the definitive host and the cycle repeats. There may be paratenic hosts (hosts where parasites infest but do not undergo larval development or sexual reproduction) for Zeylanechinorhynchus.

Zeylanechinorhynchus parasitizes Mystus vittatus. There are no reported cases of Zeylanechinorhynchus infesting humans in the English language medical literature.

Hosts for Zeylanechinorhynchus

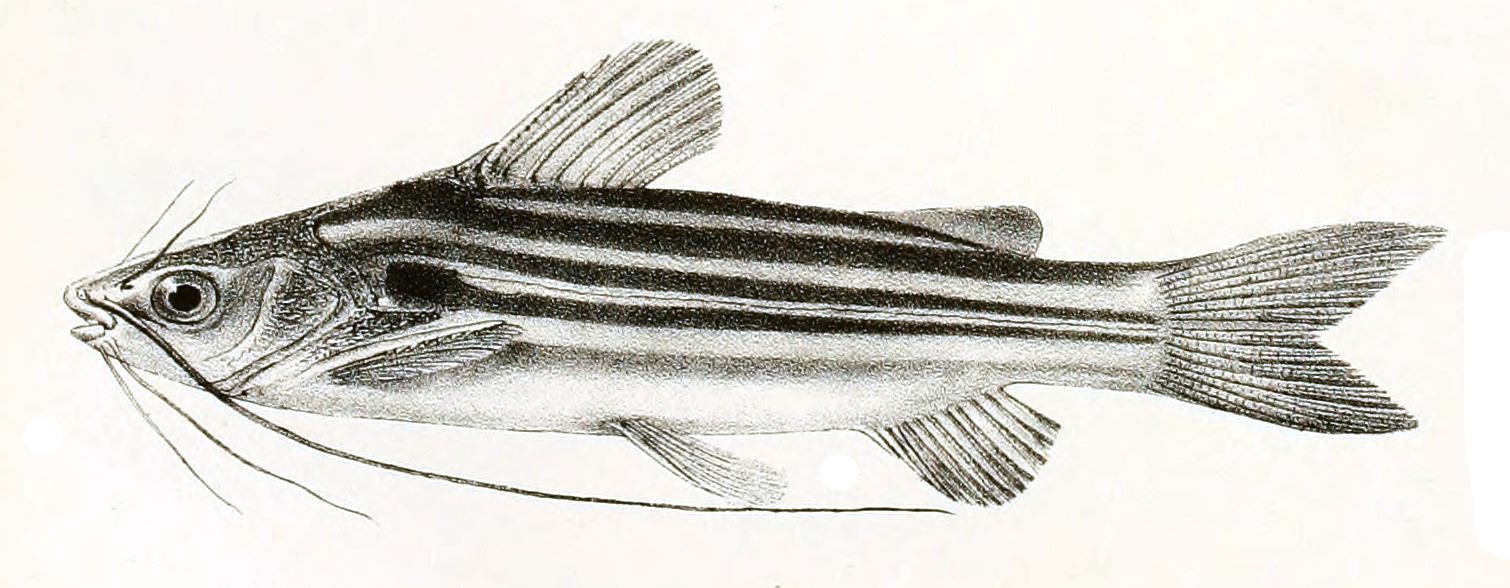
