= Gorytocephalus =

Scientific classification
- Kingdom: Animalia
- Phylum: Acanthocephala
- Class: Eoacanthocephala
- Order: Neoechinorhynchida
- Family: Neoechinorhynchidae
- Genus: Gorytocephalus; Nickol & Thatcher, 1971

Genus of thorny-headed worms

Gorytocephalus is a genus in Acanthocephala (thorny-headed worms, also known as spiny-headed worms) belonging to the family Neoechinorhynchidae.

== Taxonomy ==
The genus was described by Nickol & Thatcher, 1971. The National Center for Biotechnology Information does not indicate that any phylogenetic analysis has been published on Gorytocephalus that would confirm its position as a unique order in the family Neoechinorhynchidae.

== Description ==
Gorytocephalus species consist of a proboscis covered in hooks and a long trunk.

== Species ==
The genus Gorytocephalus Nickol & Thatcher, 1971 contains four species.

- Gorytocephalus elongorchis Thatcher, 1979
- Gorytocephalus plecostomorum Nickol and Thatcher, 1971
- Gorytocephalus spectabilis (Machado-Filho, 1959) (Note: A binomial authority in parentheses indicates that the species was originally described in a genus other than Gigantorhynchus. This species was originally named Neoechinorhynchus spectabilis by Machado-Filho in 1959 but moved to Gorytocephalus by Nickol and Thatcher, 1971.)
- Gorytocephalus talaensis Vizcaino and Lunaschi, 1988

== Distribution ==
The distribution of Gorytocephalus is determined by that of its hosts. The species of this genus are found in Southern America.

== Hosts ==
Life cycle of Acanthocephala. (Note: There are no known aberrant human infections for Gorytocephalus species.)

The life cycle of an acanthocephalan consists of three stages beginning when an infective acanthor (development of an egg) is released from the intestines of the definitive host and then ingested by an arthropod, the intermediate host. Although the intermediate hosts of Gorytocephalus are ???. When the acanthor molts, the second stage called the acanthella begins. This stage involves penetrating the wall of the mesenteron or the intestine of the intermediate host and growing. The final stage is the infective cystacanth which is the larval or juvenile state of an Acanthocephalan, differing from the adult only in size and stage of sexual development. The cystacanths within the intermediate hosts are consumed by the definitive host, usually attaching to the walls of the intestines, and as adults they reproduce sexually in the intestines. The acanthor is passed in the feces of the definitive host and the cycle repeats. There may be paratenic hosts (hosts where parasites infest but do not undergo larval development or sexual reproduction) for Gorytocephalus.

Gorytocephalus parasitizes animals. There are no reported cases of Gorytocephalus infesting humans in the English language medical literature.

Hosts for Gorytocephalus species
