= Octospinifer =

Scientific classification
- Kingdom: Animalia
- Phylum: Acanthocephala
- Class: Eoacanthocephala
- Order: Neoechinorhynchida
- Family: Neoechinorhynchidae
- Genus: Octospinifer; Van Cleave, 1919

Genus of thorny-headed worms

Octospinifer is a genus in Acanthocephala (thorny-headed worms, also known as spiny-headed worms) belonging to the family Neoechinorhynchidae.

== Taxonomy ==
The genus was described by Van Cleave in 1919. A phylogenetic analysis has been published on O. macilentus.

== Description ==
Octospinifer species consist of a proboscis covered in hooks and a trunk.

== Species ==
The genus Octospinifer Van Cleave, 1919 contains four species.

- Octospinifer macilentus Van Cleave, 1919

Parasitizes the white sucker, (Catostomus commersonii).

- Octospinifer rohitaii Zuberi and Farooqi, 1976

Parasitizes the rohu (Labeo rohita) in Kinjar Lake, Sind, Pakistan.

- Octospinifer torosus Van Cleave and Haderlie, 1950

Parasitizes the Sacramento sucker (Catostomus occidentalis) in Clear Lake California.

- Octospinifer variabilis (Deising, 1851) (Note: A binomial authority in parentheses indicates that the species was originally described in a genus other than Octospinifer. Octospinifer variabilis was originally named Echinorhynchus variabilis by Diesing in 1851.)

== Distribution ==
The distribution of Octospinifer is determined by that of its hosts. The species of this genus are found in Northern America.

== Hosts ==
Life cycle of Acanthocephala. (Note: There are no known aberrant human infections for Octospinifer species.)

The life cycle of an acanthocephalan consists of three stages beginning when an infective acanthor (development of an egg) is released from the intestines of the definitive host and then ingested by an arthropod, the intermediate host. Although the intermediate hosts of Octospinifer are arthropods. When the acanthor molts, the second stage called the acanthella begins. This stage involves penetrating the wall of the mesenteron or the intestine of the intermediate host and growing. The final stage is the infective cystacanth which is the larval or juvenile state of an Acanthocephalan, differing from the adult only in size and stage of sexual development. The cystacanths within the intermediate hosts are consumed by the definitive host, usually attaching to the walls of the intestines, and as adults they reproduce sexually in the intestines. The acanthor is passed in the feces of the definitive host and the cycle repeats. There may be paratenic hosts (hosts where parasites infest but do not undergo larval development or sexual reproduction) for Octospinifer.

Octospinifer parasitizes animals. There are no reported cases of Octospinifer infesting humans in the English language medical literature.

Hosts for Octospinifer species

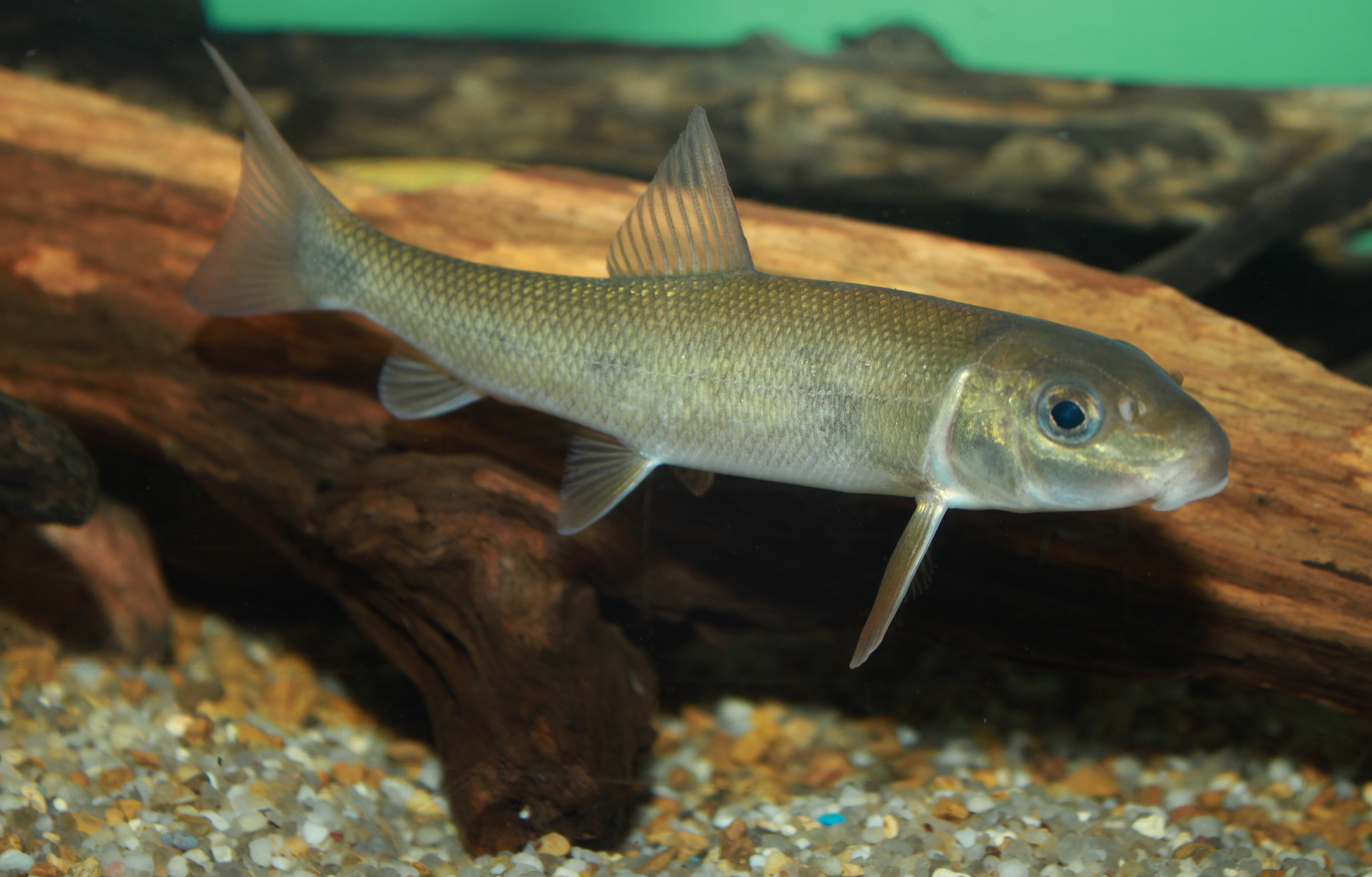
The White Sucker is a host of O. macilentus.

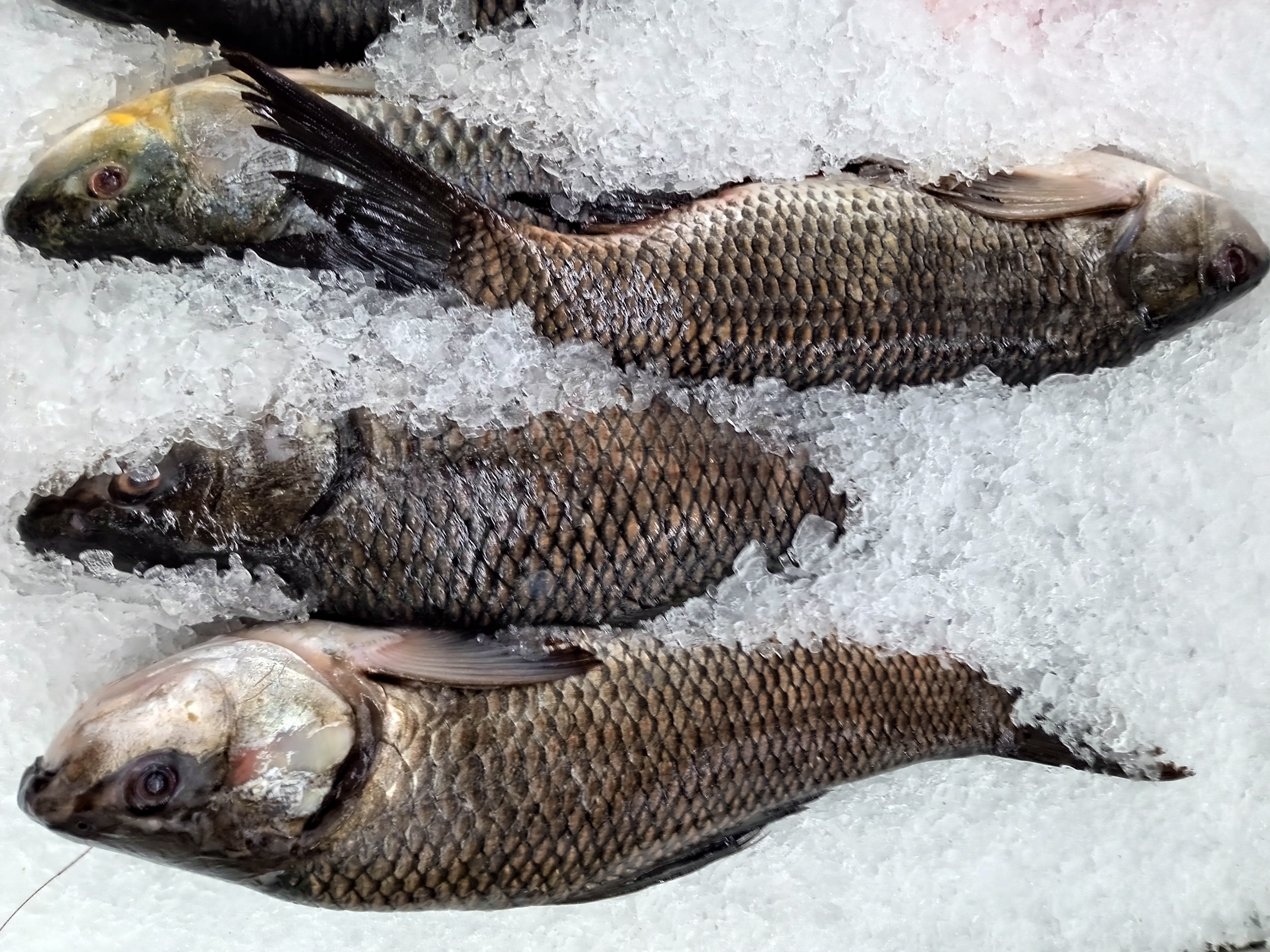
The rohu is a host for O. rohitaii.

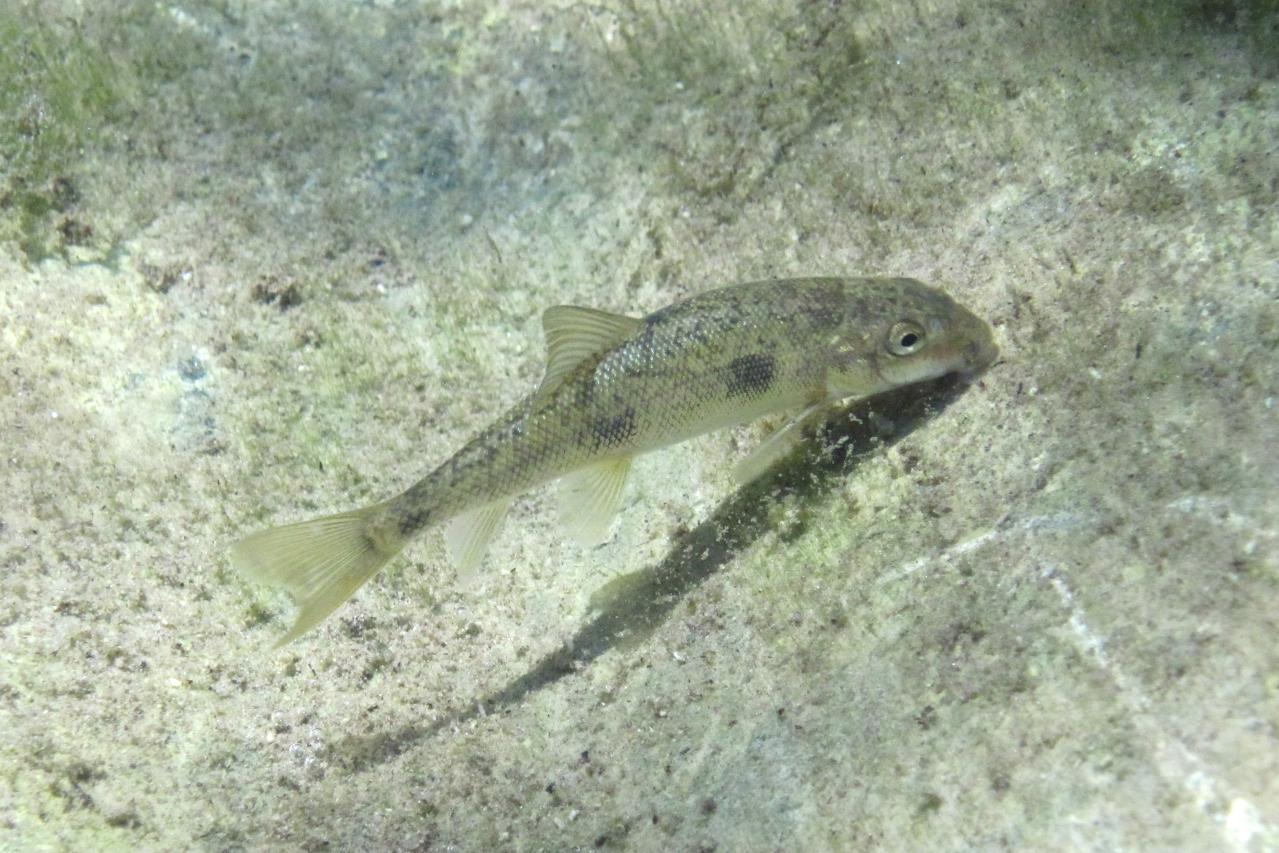
The Sacramento sucker is a host for O. torosus.
