= Paulisentis =

Scientific classification
- Kingdom: Animalia
- Phylum: Acanthocephala
- Class: Eoacanthocephala
- Order: Neoechinorhynchida
- Family: Neoechinorhynchidae
- Genus: Paulisentis; Van Cleave & Bangham, 1949

Type species
- Paulisentis fractus Van Cleave and Bangham, 1949

Genus of parasitic worms

Paulisentis is a genus in Acanthocephala (thorny-headed worms, also known as spiny-headed worms) belonging to the family Neoechinorhynchidae.

== Taxonomy ==
The genus was described by Van Cleave and Bangham in 1949. The National Center for Biotechnology Information does not indicate that any phylogenetic analysis has been published on any Paulisentis species that would confirm its position as a unique genus in the family Neoechinorhynchidae.

== Description ==
Paulisentis species consist of a proboscis covered in hooks and a long trunk.

== Species ==
The genus Paulisentis contains two species.

- Paulisentis fractus Van Cleave & Bangham, 1949
- Paulisentis missouriensis Keppner, 1974

== Distribution ==
The distribution of Paulisentis is determined by that of its hosts. The species of this genus are found in Northern America.

== Hosts ==
Life cycle of Acanthocephala. (Note: There are no known aberrant human infections for Paulisentis species.)

The life cycle of an acanthocephalan consists of three stages beginning when an infective acanthor (development of an egg) is released from the intestines of the definitive host and then ingested by an arthropod, the intermediate host. Although the intermediate hosts of Paulisentis are arthropods. When the acanthor molts, the second stage called the acanthella begins. This stage involves penetrating the wall of the mesenteron or the intestine of the intermediate host and growing. The final stage is the infective cystacanth which is the larval or juvenile state of an Acanthocephalan, differing from the adult only in size and stage of sexual development. The cystacanths within the intermediate hosts are consumed by the definitive host, usually attaching to the walls of the intestines, and as adults they reproduce sexually in the intestines. The acanthor is passed in the feces of the definitive host and the cycle repeats. There may be paratenic hosts (hosts where parasites infest but do not undergo larval development or sexual reproduction) for Paulisentis.

Paulisentis parasitizes animals. There are no reported cases of Paulisentis infesting humans in the English language medical literature.

Hosts for Paulisentis species

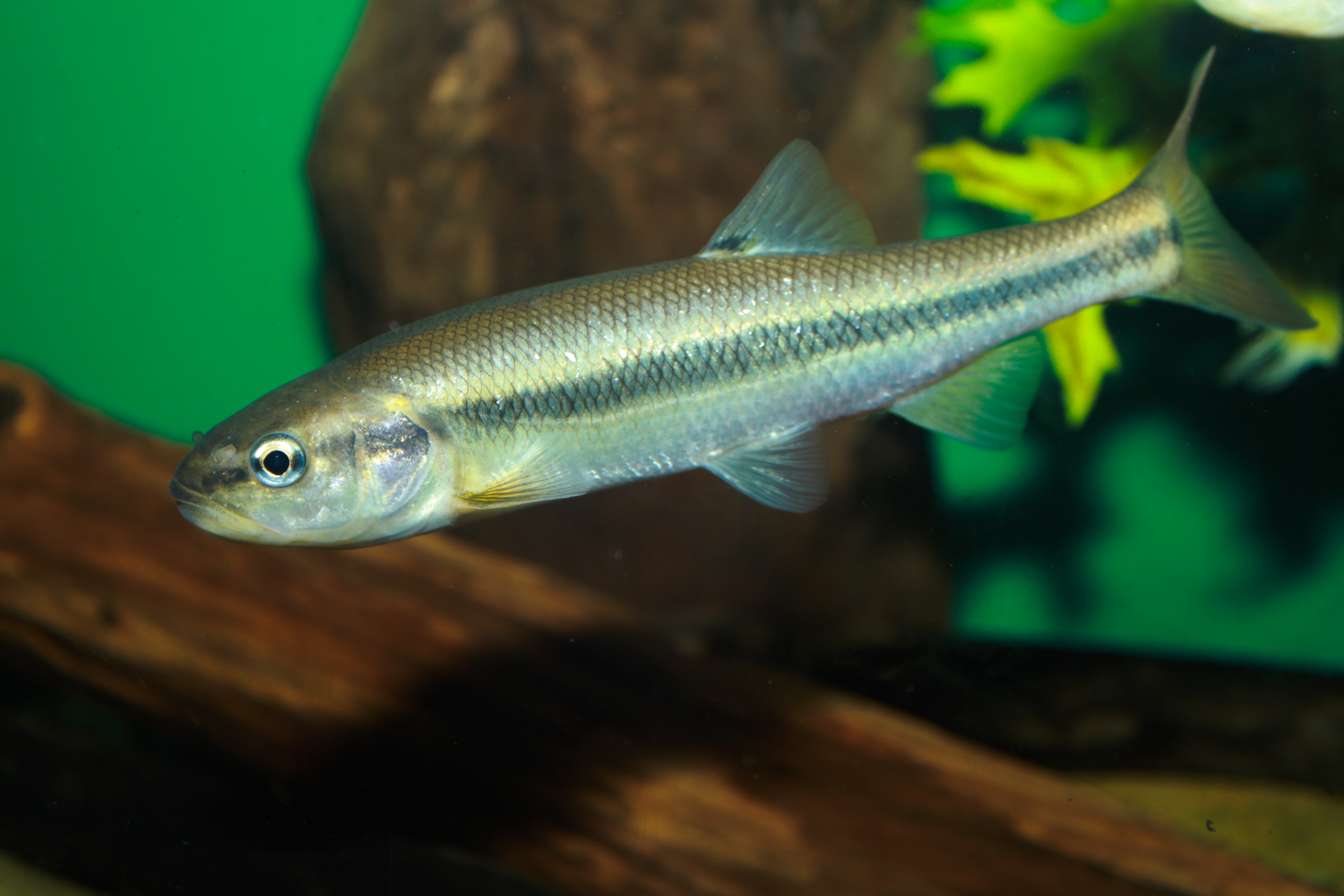
The definitive host of Semotilus atromaculatus is Paulisentis missouriensis
