= Floridosentis =

Scientific classification
- Kingdom: Animalia
- Phylum: Acanthocephala
- Class: Eoacanthocephala
- Order: Neoechinorhynchida
- Family: Neoechinorhynchidae
- Subfamily: Atactorhynchinae
- Genus: Floridosentis; Ward, 1953

Type species
- Floridosentis elongatus Ward, 1953

Genus of parasitic worms

Floridosentis is a genus in Acanthocephala (thorny-headed worms, also known as spiny-headed worms).

== Taxonomy ==
The genus was described by Ward in 1953. Phylogenetic studies have been published on this genus.

== Description ==
Floridosentis species consist of a proboscis covered in hooks and a long trunk.

== Species ==
The genus Floridosentis Ward, 1953 contains species. (Note: A binomial authority in parentheses indicates that the species was originally described in a genus other than the present genus.)

- Floridosentis mugilis (Machado-Filho, 1951)
- Floridosentis pacifica Bravo-Hollis, 1969

== Distribution ==
The distribution of Floridosentis is determined by that of its hosts.

== Hosts ==
Life cycle of Acanthocephala. (Note: There are no known aberrant human infections for Floridosentis species.)

The life cycle of an acanthocephalan consists of three stages beginning when an infective acanthor (development of an egg) is released from the intestines of the definitive host and then ingested by an arthropod, the intermediate host. Although the intermediate hosts of Floridosentis are ???. When the acanthor molts, the second stage called the acanthella begins. This stage involves penetrating the wall of the mesenteron or the intestine of the intermediate host and growing. The final stage is the infective cystacanth which is the larval or juvenile state of an Acanthocephalan, differing from the adult only in size and stage of sexual development. The cystacanths within the intermediate hosts are consumed by the definitive host, usually attaching to the walls of the intestines, and as adults they reproduce sexually in the intestines. The acanthor are passed in the feces of the definitive host and the cycle repeats. There may be paratenic hosts (hosts where parasites infest but do not undergo larval development or sexual reproduction) for Floridosentis.

Floridosentis parasitizes marine fish. There are no reported cases of Floridosentis infesting humans in the English language medical literature.
