= Octospiniferoides =

Scientific classification
- Kingdom: Animalia
- Phylum: Acanthocephala
- Class: Eoacanthocephala
- Order: Neoechinorhynchida
- Family: Neoechinorhynchidae
- Genus: Octospiniferoides; Bullock, 1957

Genus of worms

Octospiniferoides is a genus in Acanthocephala (thorny-headed worms, also known as spiny-headed worms) belonging to the family Neoechinorhynchidae.

== Taxonomy ==
The genus was described by Bullock in 1957. A phylogenetic analysis has been conducted on an unidentified species.

== Description ==
Octospiniferoides species consist of a proboscis covered in hooks and a long trunk.

== Species ==
The genus Octospiniferoides Bullock, 1957 contains three species.

- Octospiniferoides australis Schmidt and Hugghins, 1973
- Octospiniferoides chandleri Bullock, 1957
- Octospiniferoides incognita Schmidt and Hugghins, 1973

== Distribution ==
The distribution of Octospiniferoides is determined by that of its hosts. The species of this genus are found in Central America.

== Hosts ==
Life cycle of Acanthocephala. (Note: There are no known aberrant human infections for Octospiniferoides species.)

The life cycle of an acanthocephalan consists of three stages beginning when an infective acanthor (development of an egg) is released from the intestines of the definitive host and then ingested by an arthropod, the intermediate host. Although the intermediate hosts of Octospiniferoides are ???. When the acanthor molts, the second stage called the acanthella begins. This stage involves penetrating the wall of the mesenteron or the intestine of the intermediate host and growing. The final stage is the infective cystacanth which is the larval or juvenile state of an Acanthocephalan, differing from the adult only in size and stage of sexual development. The cystacanths within the intermediate hosts are consumed by the definitive host, usually attaching to the walls of the intestines, and as adults they reproduce sexually in the intestines. The acanthor is passed in the feces of the definitive host and the cycle repeats. There may be paratenic hosts (hosts where parasites infest but do not undergo larval development or sexual reproduction) for xx.

Octospiniferoides parasitizes animals. There are no reported cases of Octospiniferoides infesting humans in the English language medical literature.

Hosts for xx species
