= Dispiron =

Scientific classification
- Kingdom: Animalia
- Phylum: Acanthocephala
- Class: Eoacanthocephala
- Order: Neoechinorhynchida
- Family: Neoechinorhynchidae
- Genus: Dispiron; Bilqees, 1970

Genus of thorny-headed worms

Dispiron is a genus in Acanthocephala (thorny-headed worms, also known as spiny-headed worms) belonging to the family Neoechinorhynchidae.

== Taxonomy ==
The genus was described by Bilqees in 1970. The National Center for Biotechnology Information does not indicate that any phylogenetic analysis has been published on any Dispiron species that would confirm its position as a unique order in the class Neoechinorhynchidae.

== Description ==
Dispiron species consist of a proboscis covered in hooks and a trunk.

== Species ==
The genus Dispiron Bilqees, 1970 contains species.

- Dispiron catlai Khan and Bilqees, 1987
- Dispiron heteroacanthus Khan and Bilqees, 1985
- Dispiron mugili Bilqees, 1970

== Distribution ==
The distribution of Dispiron is determined by that of its hosts.

== Hosts ==
Life cycle of Acanthocephala. (Note: There are no known aberrant human infections for Dispiron species.)

The life cycle of an acanthocephalan consists of three stages beginning when an infective acanthor (development of an egg) is released from the intestines of the definitive host and then ingested by an arthropod, the intermediate host. The intermediate hosts of Dispiron are arthropods. When the acanthor molts, the second stage called the acanthella begins. This stage involves penetrating the wall of the mesenteron or the intestine of the intermediate host and growing. The final stage is the infective cystacanth which is the larval or juvenile state of an Acanthocephalan, differing from the adult only in size and stage of sexual development. The cystacanths within the intermediate hosts are consumed by the definitive host, usually attaching to the walls of the intestines, and as adults they reproduce sexually in the intestines. The acanthor is passed in the feces of the definitive host and the cycle repeats. There may be paratenic hosts (hosts where parasites infest but do not undergo larval development or sexual reproduction) for Dispiron.

Dispiron parasitizes animals. There are no reported cases of Dispiron infesting humans in the English language medical literature.

Hosts for Dispiron species
