= Wolffhugelia =

Scientific classification
- Kingdom: Animalia
- Phylum: Acanthocephala
- Class: Eoacanthocephala
- Order: Neoechinorhynchida
- Family: Neoechinorhynchidae
- Subfamily: Gracilisentinae
- Genus: Wolffhugelia; Mane-Garzon and Dei-Cas, 1974
- Species: W. matercula

Binomial name
- Wolffhugelia matercula Mane-Garzon and Dei-Cas, 1974

Genus of parasitic worms

Wolffhugelia is a monotypic genus of acanthocephalans (thorny-headed or spiny-headed parasitic worms) containing a single species, Wolffhugelia matercula, that infests animals.

== Taxonomy ==
The species was described by Mane-Garzon and Dei-Cas in 1974. The National Center for Biotechnology Information does not indicate that any phylogenetic analysis has been published on Wolffhugelia that would confirm its position as a unique genus in the family Neoechinorhynchidae.

== Description ==
Wolffhugelia matercula consists of a proboscis covered in hooks and a trunk.

== Distribution ==
The distribution of W. matercula is determined by that of its hosts. It is from Uruguay.

== Hosts ==
Life cycle of Acanthocephala. (Note: There are no known aberrant human infections for W. matercula species.)

The life cycle of an acanthocephalan consists of three stages beginning when an infective acanthor (development of an egg) is released from the intestines of the definitive host and then ingested by an arthropod, the intermediate host. Although the intermediate hosts of Wolffhugelia are not known, they are always arthropods. When the acanthor molts, the second stage called the acanthella begins. This stage involves penetrating the wall of the mesenteron or the intestine of the intermediate host and growing. The final stage is the infective cystacanth which is the larval or juvenile state of an Acanthocephalan, differing from the adult only in size and stage of sexual development. The cystacanths within the intermediate hosts are consumed by the definitive host, usually attaching to the walls of the intestines, and as adults they reproduce sexually in the intestines. The acanthor is passed in the feces of the definitive host and the cycle repeats. There may be paratenic hosts (hosts where parasites infest but do not undergo larval development or sexual reproduction) for Wolffhugelia.

W. matercula parasitizes a onesided livebearer (Jenynsia lineata). There are no reported cases of W. matercula infesting humans in the English language medical literature.
