= Tenuisentidae =

Scientific classification
- Kingdom: Animalia
- Phylum: Acanthocephala
- Class: Eoacanthocephala
- Order: Neoechinorhynchida
- Family: Tenuisentidae; Van Cleave, 1936

Genera
- Paratenuisentis; Tenuisentis

Family of thorny-headed worms

Tenuisentidae is a family of parasitic spiny-headed (or thorny-headed) worms. The family contains two genera, each with one species.

== Description and taxonomy ==
Neoechinorhynchida

- Neoechinorhynchida
  - Neoechinorhynchidae
    - Neoechinorhynchus crassus
    - Neoechinorhynchus salmonis
  - Tenuisentidae
    - Paratenuisentis ambiguus
    - Tenuisentis niloticus

Phylogenetic reconstruction for select species in the order Neoechinorhynchida.

== Species ==
There are two genera, each with a single species. (Note: A binomial authority in parentheses indicates that the species was originally described in a genus other than the present genus.)

Paratenuisentis Bullock and Samuel, 1975

- Paratenuisentis ambiguus (Van Cleave, 1921)

P. ambiguus infects the European eel (Anguilla anguilla).

Tenuisentis Van Cleave, 1936

- Tenuisentis niloticus (Meyer, 1932) (Note: The species was originally named Rhadinorhynchus niloticus.)

T. niloticus was found infecting the small intestine of the African arowana (Heterotis niloticus). The species name niloticus derives from the species name of the host fish, also niloticus. It has also been found in the Egyptian Nile and River Sourou at Di, Sourou Province, Burkina Faso, Sudan and Mali. It has also been found in the electric catfish (Malapterurus electricus) in Lekki Lagoon, Lagos, Nigeria. The proboscis contains 16 (rarely 15) rows of hooks, each with 30–33 hooks with the average hook length per row being 1,105 um in the female and 993 um in the male. The hooks are not symmetrical in robustness dorso-ventrally but does contain similar length angles of curvature. The ventral hooks were considerably larger and more recurved than the dorsal hooks. The males have cement glands between 6.62 and 6.92 mm long. There are 86–146 nuclei.

== Hosts ==
Worms of the Tenuisentidae family exclusively parasitize fish.

Hosts for Tenuisentidae species

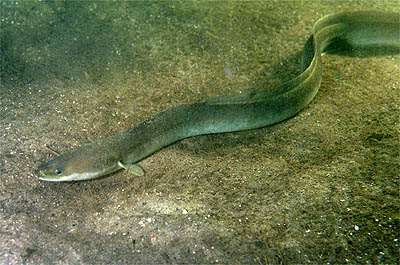
The European eel is a host of P. ambiguus

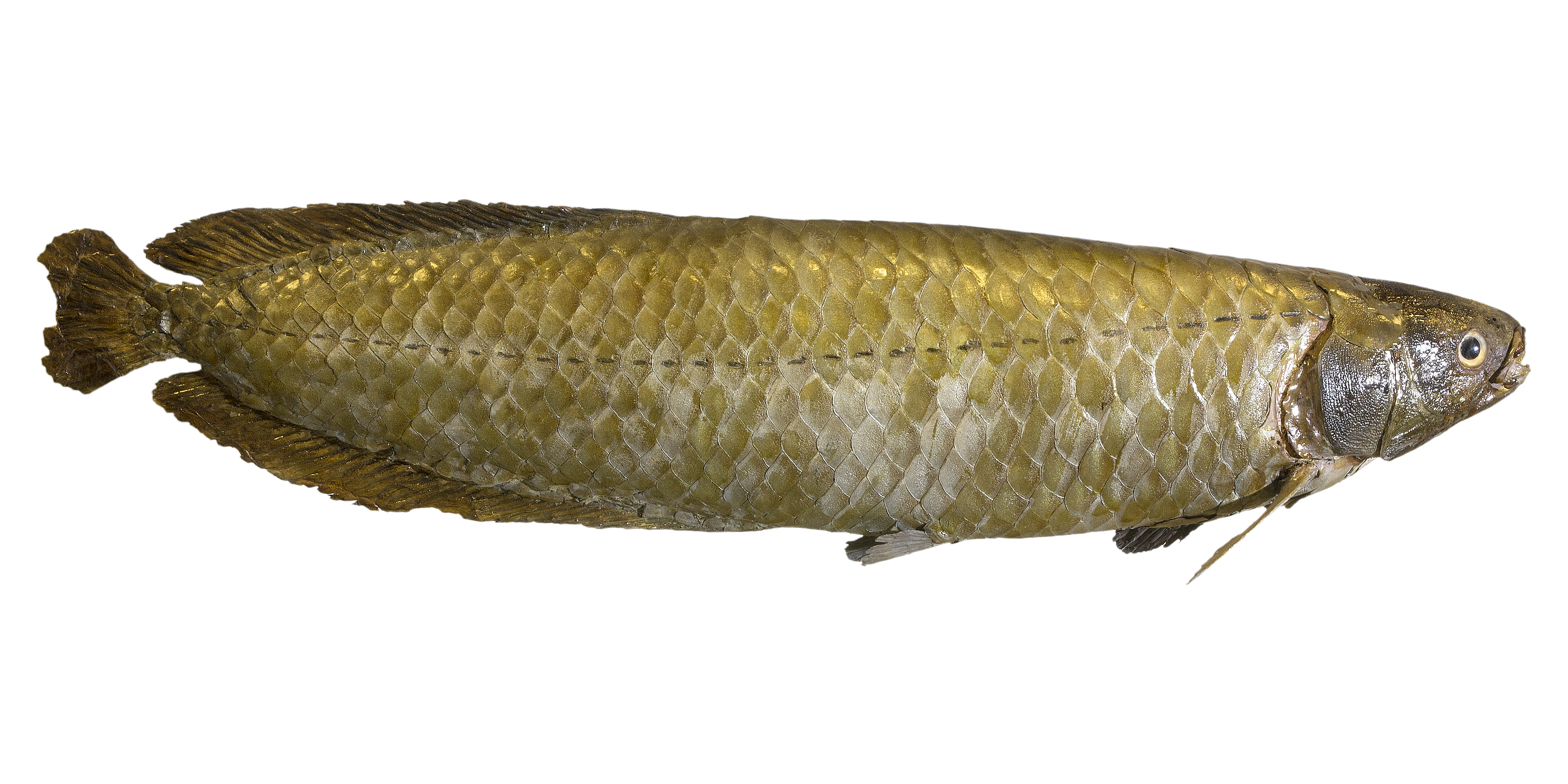
The African arowana is a host of T. niloticus
