= Pandosentis =

Scientific classification
- Kingdom: Animalia
- Phylum: Acanthocephala
- Class: Eoacanthocephala
- Order: Neoechinorhynchida
- Family: Neoechinorhynchidae
- Subfamily: Gracilisentinae
- Genus: Pandosentis; Van Cleave, 1920

Synonyms
- Pandoncentis Travassos, 1926

Genus of parasitic worms

Pandosentis is a genus in Acanthocephala (thorny-headed worms, also known as spiny-headed worms).

== Taxonomy ==
The genus was described by Van Cleve in 1920. The National Center for Biotechnology Information does not indicate that any phylogenetic analysis has been published on Pandosentis that would confirm its position as a unique order in the family Neoechinorhynchidae.

== Description ==
Pandosentis species consist of a proboscis covered in hooks and a trunk.

== Species ==
The genus Pandosentis Van Cleve, 1920 contains two species.

- Pandosentis iracundus Van Cleve, 1920
- Pandosentis napoensis Smales, 2007

== Distribution ==
The distribution of Pandosentis is determined by that of its hosts.

== Hosts ==
Life cycle of Acanthocephala. (Note: There are no known aberrant human infections for Pandosentis species.)

The life cycle of an acanthocephalan consists of three stages beginning when an infective acanthor (development of an egg) is released from the intestines of the definitive host and then ingested by an arthropod, the intermediate host. Although the intermediate hosts of Pandosentis are ???. When the acanthor molts, the second stage called the acanthella begins. This stage involves penetrating the wall of the mesenteron or the intestine of the intermediate host and growing. The final stage is the infective cystacanth which is the larval or juvenile state of an Acanthocephalan, differing from the adult only in size and stage of sexual development. The cystacanths within the intermediate hosts are consumed by the definitive host, usually attaching to the walls of the intestines, and as adults they reproduce sexually in the intestines. The acanthor is passed in the feces of the definitive host and the cycle repeats. There may be paratenic hosts (hosts where parasites infest but do not undergo larval development or sexual reproduction) for Pandosentis.

Pandosentis parasitizes Gunther's banded tree frog (Boana fasciata). There are no reported cases of Pandosentis infesting humans in the English language medical literature.

Hosts for Pandosentis species

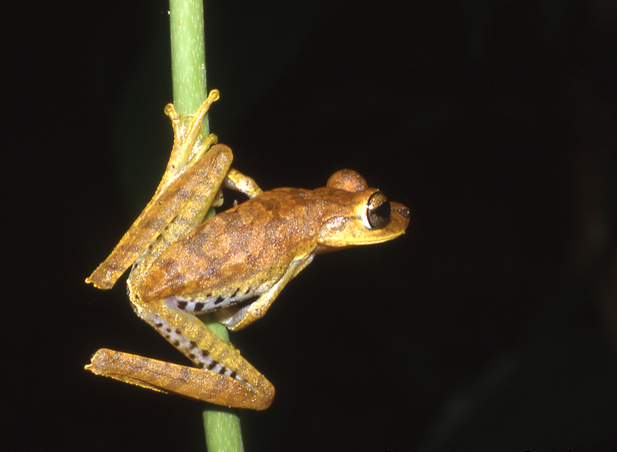
Gunther's banded tree frog is the host for P. napoensis
