= Paratenuisentis =

Scientific classification
- Domain: Eukaryota
- Kingdom: Animalia
- Phylum: Rotifera
- Class: Eoacanthocephala
- Order: Neoechinorhynchida
- Family: Tenuisentidae
- Genus: Paratenuisentis; Bullock & Samuel, 1975

Genus of worms

Paratenuisentis is a genus of parasitic worms belonging to the family Tenuisentidae.

The species of this genus are found in Northern America.

Species:

- Paratenuisentis ambiguus (Van Cleave, 1921) (Note: A binomial authority in parentheses indicates that the species was originally described in a genus other than the present genus.)

== Hosts ==
P. ambiguus infects the European eel (Anguilla anguilla).
