= Neorhynchus =

Neorhynchus may mean:

- Collodes, a genus of crabs
- Sporophila, a genus of Neotropical birds
- Neoechinorhynchus, a genus of parasitic worms
- Apororhynchus, a genus of small parasitic spiny-headed (or thorny-headed) worms
