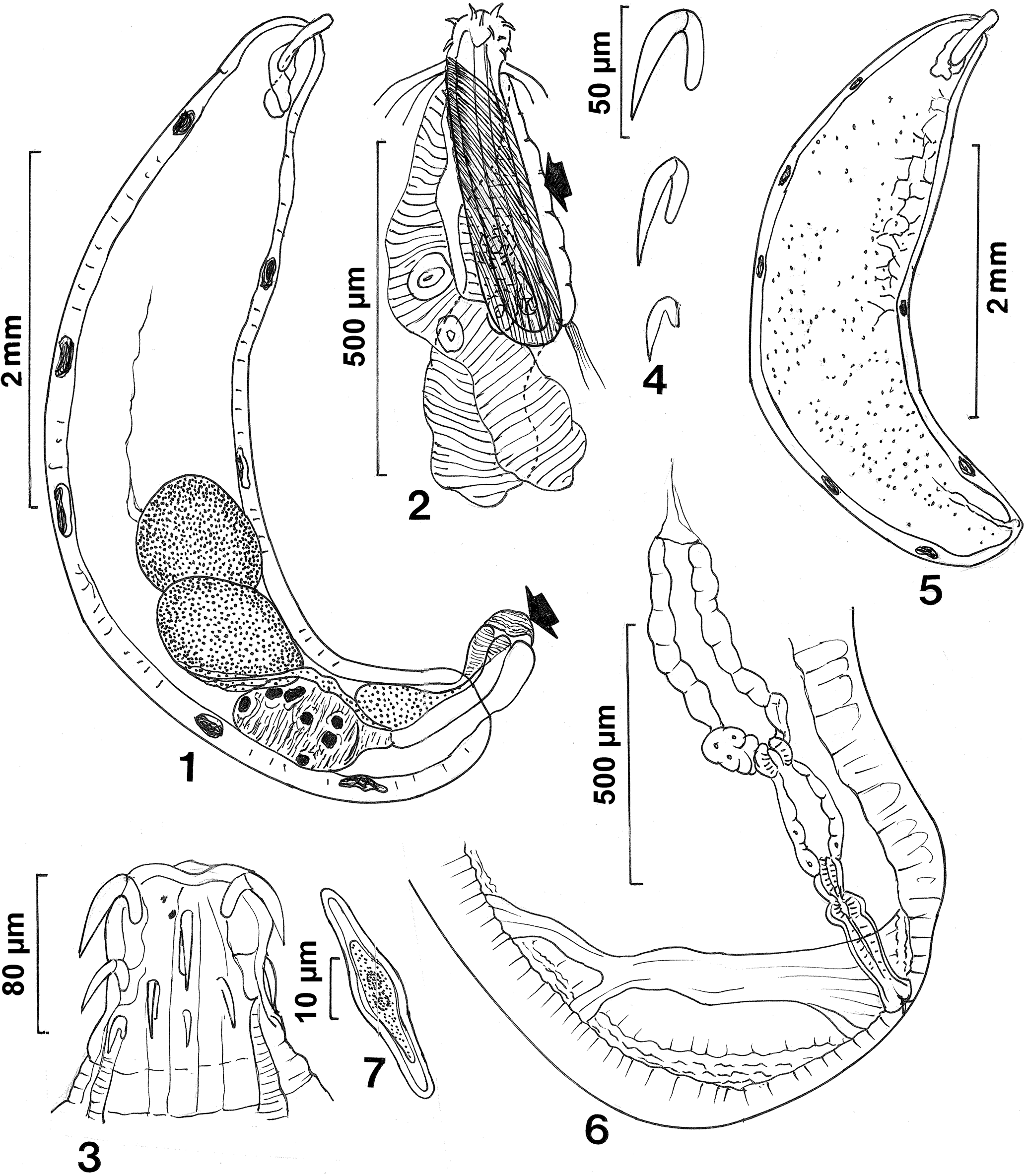
- Neoechinorhynchus spiramuscularis

Scientific classification
- Kingdom: Animalia
- Phylum: Acanthocephala
- Class: Eoacanthocephala
- Order: Neoechinorhynchida
- Family: Neoechinorhynchidae
- Genus: Neoechinorhynchus; Hamann, 1905

= Neoechinorhynchus =

Genus of worms

Neoechinorhynchus is a genus of parasitic worms belonging to the family Neoechinorhynchidae.

The genus has cosmopolitan distribution.

Neoechinorhynchus Stiles and Hassall, 1905 has two subgenera, Hebesoma and Neoechinorhynchus, with 116 known species:

- Neoechinorhynchus afghanus František Moravec (parasitologist)|Moravec and Amin, 1978
- Neoechinorhynchus aldrichettae Edmonds, 1971
- Neoechinorhynchus ampullata Amin, Ha and Ha, 2011
- Neoechinorhynchus argentatus Chandra, Hanumantha-Rao and Shyamasundari, 1984
- Neoechinorhynchus bangoni Tripathi, 1959
- Neoechinorhynchus brayi Bilqees, Shaikh and Khan, 2011
- Neoechinorhynchus cirrhinae Gupta and Jain, 1979
- Neoechinorhynchus coiliae Satyu Yamaguti|Yamaguti, 1939
- Neoechinorhynchus cyanophyctis Kaw, 1951
- Neoechinorhynchus devdevi (Datta, 1936)
- Neoechinorhynchus glyptosternumi Fotedar and Dhar, 1977
- Neoechinorhynchus hartwichi Golvan, 1994
- Neoechinorhynchus hutchinsoni Datta, 1936
- Neoechinorhynchus ichthyobori Saoud, El-naffar, Abu-sinna, 1974
- Neoechinorhynchus indicus Gudivada, Chikkam and Vankara, 2010
- Neoechinorhynchus karachiensis Bilgees, 1972
- Neoechinorhynchus logilemniscus Satyu Yamaguti|Yamaguti, 1954
- Neoechinorhynchus magnus Southwell and Macfie, 1925
- Neoechinorhynchus mexicoensis Pinacho-Pinacho, Sereno-Uribe and García-Varela, 2014
- Neoechinorhynchus miniovalis Amin, Ali and Adday, 2024

This parasite was found infesting the Mudskipper (Boleophthalmus dussumieri) in Shatt Al-Basrah Canal Southern Iraq.

- Neoechinorhynchus nematalosi Tripathi, 1959
- Neoechinorhynchus nigeriensis Farooqi, 1981
- Neoechinorhynchus ningalooensis Pichelin and Cribb, 2001
- Neoechinorhynchus octonucleatus Tubangui, 1933
- Neoechinorhynchus oreini Fotedar, 1968
- Neoechinorhynchus ovalis Tripathi, 1959
- Neoechinorhynchus personatus Tkach, Sarabeev and Shvetsova, 2014
- Neoechinorhynchus roonwali Datta and Soota, 1963
- Neoechinorhynchus saginatus Van Cleave and Bangham, 1949
- Neoechinorhynchus simansularis Roytman, 1961
- Neoechinorhynchus topseyi Podder, 1937
- Neoechinorhynchus tsintaoense Morisita, 1937
- Neoechinorhynchus veropesoi Melo, Costa, Giese, Gardner and Santos, 2015
- Neoechinorhynchus yamagutii Tkach, Sarabeev and Shvetsova, 2014
- Neoechinorhynchus zacconis Satyu Yamaguti|Yamaguti, 1935

== Hebesoma Van Cleave, 1928 ==
Hebesoma is a subgenus in the genus Neoechinorhynchus which contains 15 known species.

- Neoechinorhynchus agilis (Rudolphi, 1819)
- Neoechinorhynchus anguillum El-Damarany, 2001
- Neoechinorhynchus carinatus Buckner and Buckner, 1993
- Neoechinorhynchus chrysemydis Cable and Hopp, 1954
- Neoechinorhynchus didelphis Amin, 2001
- Neoechinorhynchus doryphorus Van Cleqve and Bangham, 1949
- Neoechinorhynchus idahoensis Amin and Heckmann, 1992
- Neoechinorhynchus kallarensis George and Nadakal, 1978
- Neoechinorhynchus lingulatus Nickol and Ernst, 1987
- Neoechinorhynchus manasbalensis Kaw, 1951
- Neoechinorhynchus manubrianus Amin, Ha and Ha, 2011
- Neoechinorhynchus pungitius Dechtiar, 1971
- Neoechinorhynchus rostratus Amin and Bullock, 1998
- Neoechinorhynchus spiramuscularis Amin, Heckmann and Ha, 2014
- Neoechinorhynchus violentus (Van Cleave, 1928)

== Neoechinorhynchus Hamann, 1892 ==
Neoechinorhynchus is a subgenus in Neoechinorhynchus which contains 66 known species.

- Neoechinorhynchus acanthuri Farooqi, 1980
- Neoechinorhynchus africanus Troncy, 1970
- Neoechinorhynchus armenicus Mikailov, 1975
- Neoechinorhynchus ascus Amin, Ha and Ha, 2011
- Neoechinorhynchus australis Van Cleave, 1931
- Neoechinorhynchus brentnickoli Monks, Pulido-Flores and Violante-Gonzalez, 2011
- Neoechinorhynchus buttnerae Golvan, 1956
- Neoechinorhynchus carassii Roytmann, 1961
- Neoechinorhynchus carpiodi Dechtiar, 1968
- Neoechinorhynchus chelonos Schmidt, Esch, and Gibbons, 1970
- Neoechinorhynchus chilkaense Podder, 1937
- Neoechinorhynchus chimalapasensis Salgado-Maldonado, 2010
- Neoechinorhynchus crassus Van Cleave, 1919
- Neoechinorhynchus cristatus Lynch, 1936
- Neoechinorhynchus curemai Noronha, 1973
- Neoechinorhynchus cylindratus (Van Cleave, 1913)
- Neoechinorhynchus dattai Golvan, 1994
- Neoechinorhynchus dimorphospinus Amin and Sey, 1996
- Neoechinorhynchus distractus Van Cleave, 1949
- Neoechinorhynchus dorsovaginatus Amin and Christison, 2005
- Neoechinorhynchus edmondsi Golvan, 1994
- Neoechinorhynchus emydis (Leidy, 1851)
- Neoechinorhynchus emyditoides Fisher, 1960
- Neoechinorhynchus formosanus Harada, 1938
- Neoechinorhynchus gibsoni Khan and Bilqees, 1989
- Neoechinorhynchus golvani Salgado-maldonado, 197
- Neoechinorhynchus iraqensis Amin, Al-Sady, Mhaisen and Bassat, 2001
- Neoechinorhynchus johnii Satyu Yamaguti|Yamaguti, 1939
- Neoechinorhynchus limi Muzzall and Buckner, 1982
- Neoechinorhynchus macronucleatus Machado, 1954
- Neoechinorhynchus magnapapillatus Johnson, 1969
- Neoechinorhynchus mamesi Pinacho-Pinacho, Pérez-Ponce de León and García-Varela, 2012
- Neoechinorhynchus moleri Barger, 2005
- Neoechinorhynchus nawazi Naqvil, Aly Khan, Ghazi and Noor-un-Nissa, 2012
- Neoechinorhynchus nickoli Khan, Bilqees, Noor-Un-Nisa, Ghazi and Ata-Ur-Rahim, 1999
- Neoechinorhynchus notemigoni Dechtiar, 1967
- Neoechinorhynchus panucensis Salgado-Maldonado, 2013
- Neoechinorhynchus paraguayensis Machado-Filho, 1959
- Neoechinorhynchus pimelodi de Carvalho and Cezar-Pavanelli, 1998
- Neoechinorhynchus plagiognathoptis Wang and Zhang, 1987
- Neoechinorhynchus plaquensis Amin, Ha and Ha, 2011
- Neoechinorhynchus prochilodorum Nickol and Thatcher, 1971
- Neoechinorhynchus prolixoides Bullock, 1963
- Neoechinorhynchus prolixus Van Cleave and Timmons, 1952
- Neoechinorhynchus pseudemydis Cable and Hopp, 1954
- Neoechinorhynchus pterodoridis Thatcher, 1981
- Neoechinorhynchus qatarensis Amin, Saoud and Alkuwari, 2002
- Neoechinorhynchus quinghaiensis Liu, Wang, and Yang, 1981
- Neoechinorhynchus rigidus (Van Cleave, 1928)
- Neoechinorhynchus robertbaueri Amin, 1985
- Neoechinorhynchus roseum Salgado and Maldonado, 1978
- Neoechinorhynchus rutili (Mueller, 1780)
- Neoechinorhynchus salmonis Ching, 1984
- Neoechinorhynchus saurogobi Yu and Wu, 1989
- Neoechinorhynchus schmidti Barger, Thatcher and Nickol, 2004
- Neoechinorhynchus sootai Bhattacharya, 1999
- Neoechinorhynchus strigosus Van Cleave, 1949
- Neoechinorhynchus stunkardi Cable and Fisher, 1961
- Neoechinorhynchus tenellus (Van Cleave, 1913)
- Neoechinorhynchus tumidus Van Cleave and Bangham, 1949
- Neoechinorhynchus tylosuri Satyu Yamaguti|Yamaguti, 1939
- Neoechinorhynchus venustus Lynch, 1936
- Neoechinorhynchus villoldoi Vizcaino, 1992
- Neoechinorhynchus wuyiensis Wang, 1981
- Neoechinorhynchus zabensis Amin, Abdullah and Mhaisen, 2003
- Neoechinorhynchus yalei (Datta, 1936)
