= Opsariichthys minutus =

Scientific classification
- Kingdom: Animalia
- Phylum: Chordata
- Class: Actinopterygii
- Order: Cypriniformes
- Family: Xenocyprididae
- Genus: Opsariichthys
- Species: O. minutus

Binomial name
- Opsariichthys minutus Nichols, 1926

Species of fish

Opsariichthys minutus is a species of [freshwater ray-finned fish belonging to the family Xenocyprididae, the East Asian minnows or sharpbellies. It inhabits southern China and has a maximum male length of 15.4 centimetres (6.1 in) and a maximum female length of 8.7 centimetres (3.4 in).
