= Opsariichthys bea =

Conservation status
- Data Deficient (IUCN 3.1)

Scientific classification
- Kingdom: Animalia
- Phylum: Chordata
- Class: Actinopterygii
- Order: Cypriniformes
- Family: Xenocyprididae
- Genus: Opsariichthys
- Species: O. bea

Binomial name
- Opsariichthys bea T. T. Nguyen, 1987

Species of fish

Opsariichthys bea is a species of cyprinid fish. It is endemic to Vietnam and only known from its type locality in the Lam River Basin.
