= Opsariichthys duchuunguyeni =

Conservation status
- Data Deficient (IUCN 3.1)

Scientific classification
- Kingdom: Animalia
- Phylum: Chordata
- Class: Actinopterygii
- Order: Cypriniformes
- Family: Xenocyprididae
- Genus: Opsariichthys
- Species: O. duchuunguyeni

Binomial name
- Opsariichthys duchuunguyeni Huynh T. Q. & I. S. Chen, 2014

Species of fish

Opsariichthys duchuunguyeni is a species of freshwater ray-finned fish belonging to the family Xenocyprididae, the East Asian minnows or sharpbellies. It inhabits Vietnam and has a maximum male length of 7.3 centimetres (2.9 in) and a maximum female length of 6.1 centimetres (2.4 in).
