= Opsariichthys hieni =

Conservation status
- Data Deficient (IUCN 3.1)

Scientific classification
- Kingdom: Animalia
- Phylum: Chordata
- Class: Actinopterygii
- Order: Cypriniformes
- Family: Xenocyprididae
- Genus: Opsariichthys
- Species: O. hieni

Binomial name
- Opsariichthys hieni T. T. Nguyen, 1987

Species of fish

Opsariichthys hieni is a species of freshwater ray-finned fish belonging to the family Xenocyprididae, the East Asian minnows or sharpbellies. It inhabits Vietnam. It is not considered harmful to humans.
