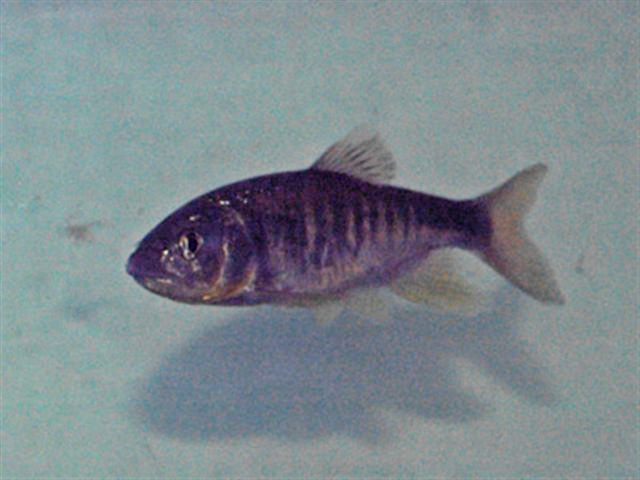

Conservation status
- Least Concern (IUCN 3.1)

Scientific classification
- Kingdom: Animalia
- Phylum: Chordata
- Class: Actinopterygii
- Order: Cypriniformes
- Family: Xenocyprididae
- Genus: Opsariichthys
- Species: O. bidens

Binomial name
- Opsariichthys bidens Günther, 1873

= Opsariichthys bidens =

Species of fish

Opsariichthys bidens, the Chinese hooksnout carp, is a species of freshwater fish in the family Xenocyprididae. It is endemic to fast-flowing streams and rivers of East Asia (China, Japan, North Korea, South Korea, and Russia) and mainland Southeast Asia (Laos and Vietnam). A mid-sized minnow, it has a maximum length of 21.9 centimetres (8.6 in) and a maximum published weight of 58.4 grams (2.06 oz), with sexual dimorphism favoring larger males.
