= Opsariichthys songmaensis =

Conservation status
- Data Deficient (IUCN 3.1)

Scientific classification
- Kingdom: Animalia
- Phylum: Chordata
- Class: Actinopterygii
- Order: Cypriniformes
- Family: Xenocyprididae
- Genus: Opsariichthys
- Species: O. songmaensis

Binomial name
- Opsariichthys songmaensis V. H. Nguyễn & H. D. Nguyễn, 2000

Species of fish

Opsariichthys songmaensis is a species of freshwater ray-finned fish belonging to the family Xenocyprididae, the East Asian minnows or sharpbellies. It inhabits Vietnam and has a maximum male length of 10.5 centimetres (4.1 in) and a maximum female length of 7.5 centimetres (3.0 in).
