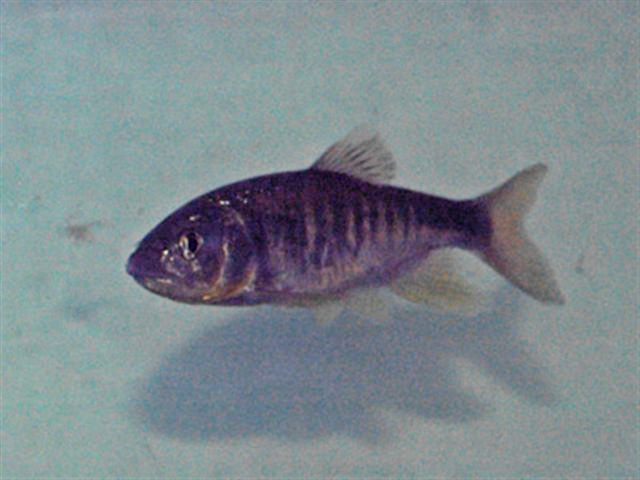

Conservation status
- Least Concern (IUCN 3.1)

Scientific classification
- Kingdom: Animalia
- Phylum: Chordata
- Class: Actinopterygii
- Order: Cypriniformes
- Family: Xenocyprididae
- Genus: Opsariichthys
- Species: O. evolans

Binomial name
- Opsariichthys evolans (Jordan & Evermann, 1902)

Synonyms
- Zacco evolans Jordan and Evermann, 1902

= Opsariichthys evolans =

Species of ray-finned fish

Opsariichthys evolans is a species of freshwater ray-finned fish belonging to the family Xenocyprididae, the East Asian minnows or sharpbellies. It inhabits freshwaters of southeastern China and Taiwan. It has a maximum male length of 9.0 centimetres (3.5 in) and a maximum female length of 7.0 centimetres (2.8 in).
