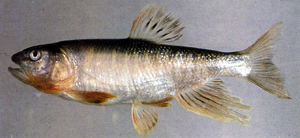

Scientific classification
- Kingdom: Animalia
- Phylum: Chordata
- Class: Actinopterygii
- Order: Cypriniformes
- Family: Xenocyprididae
- Genus: Opsariichthys
- Species: O. pachycephalus

Binomial name
- Opsariichthys pachycephalus Günther, 1868

Synonyms
- Zacco pachycephalus (Günther, 1868); Zacco taiwanensis Chen, 1982

= Opsariichthys pachycephalus =

Species of fish

Opsariichthys pachycephalus is a species of freshwater ray-finned fish belonging to the family Xenocyprididae, the East Asian minnows or sharpbellies. This species is endemic to Taiwan. It is one of the most common minnows of Taiwan, found in the entire western part of the island from sea level to 1200 m elevation. It is a small species reaching a maximum length of 16 cm (6.3 in) TL.

== Colonization history ==
Opsariichthys pachycephalus populations show strong genetic structuring between drainages and weak genetic structuring within drainages. It is suggested that the current population structuring reflects colonization from two glacial refugia, formed when the cooler climate during the last glacial period restricted this species to lower elevations: one on the land bridge that connected Taiwan to the Asian mainland, and the other one in the south, east of the Gaoping River. Further divergence may be due to founder effects, bottlenecks, and selection.

== Reproduction ==
Opsariichthys pachycephalus show two peak spawning periods, one in spring (February–April) and the other one in summer (June–August), the former being the main one. During the courtship, males chase after one female, showing aggressive behaviours among the males. Only the winner of the male-male contests follows the female to spawn. After spawning, the male may return to the spawning site to chase away egg predators.
