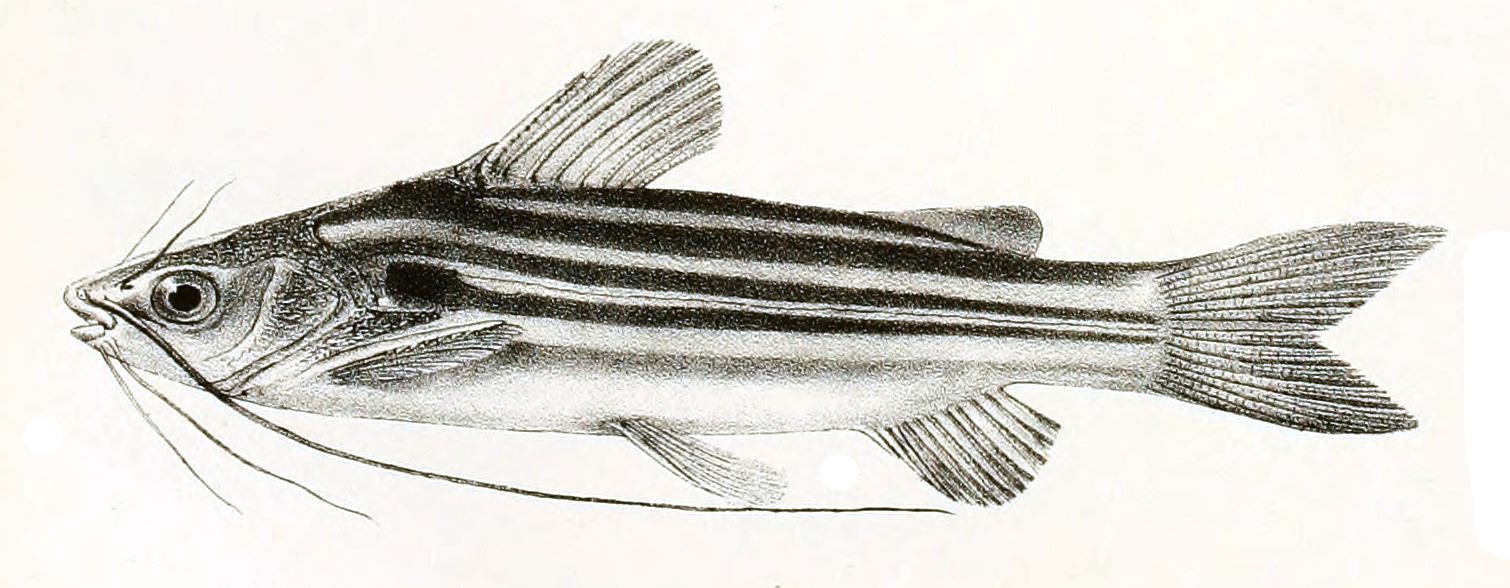

Conservation status
- Least Concern (IUCN 3.1)

Scientific classification
- Kingdom: Animalia
- Phylum: Chordata
- Class: Actinopterygii
- Order: Siluriformes
- Family: Bagridae
- Genus: Mystus
- Species: M. vittatus

Binomial name
- Mystus vittatus (Bloch, 1794)

Synonyms
- Silurus vittatus Bloch, 1794; Aoria vittatus (Bloch, 1794); Bagrus vittatus (Bloch, 1794); Macrones vittatus (Bloch, 1794)

= Mystus vittatus =

Striped Dwarf Catfish

Genus of fishes

Mystus vittatus also known as the Striped dwarf catfish is a species of catfish of the family Bagridae. It is found in brackish water systems with marginal vegetation in lakes and swamps with a mud substrate of Asian countries Pakistan, India, Sri Lanka, Nepal, Bangladesh and probably Myanmar. Populations of Southeast Asian countries is in debate, due to close morphological similarities among Mystus species in that region.

It grows to a length of 21 cm in maximum. The population is known to be decreasing in recent past, due to catching, pet trading and habitat destruction. They are known to make sounds during spawning.

== Parasites ==
M. vittatus is a host of the Acanthocephalan intestinal parasite Zeylanechinorhynchus longinuchalis.
