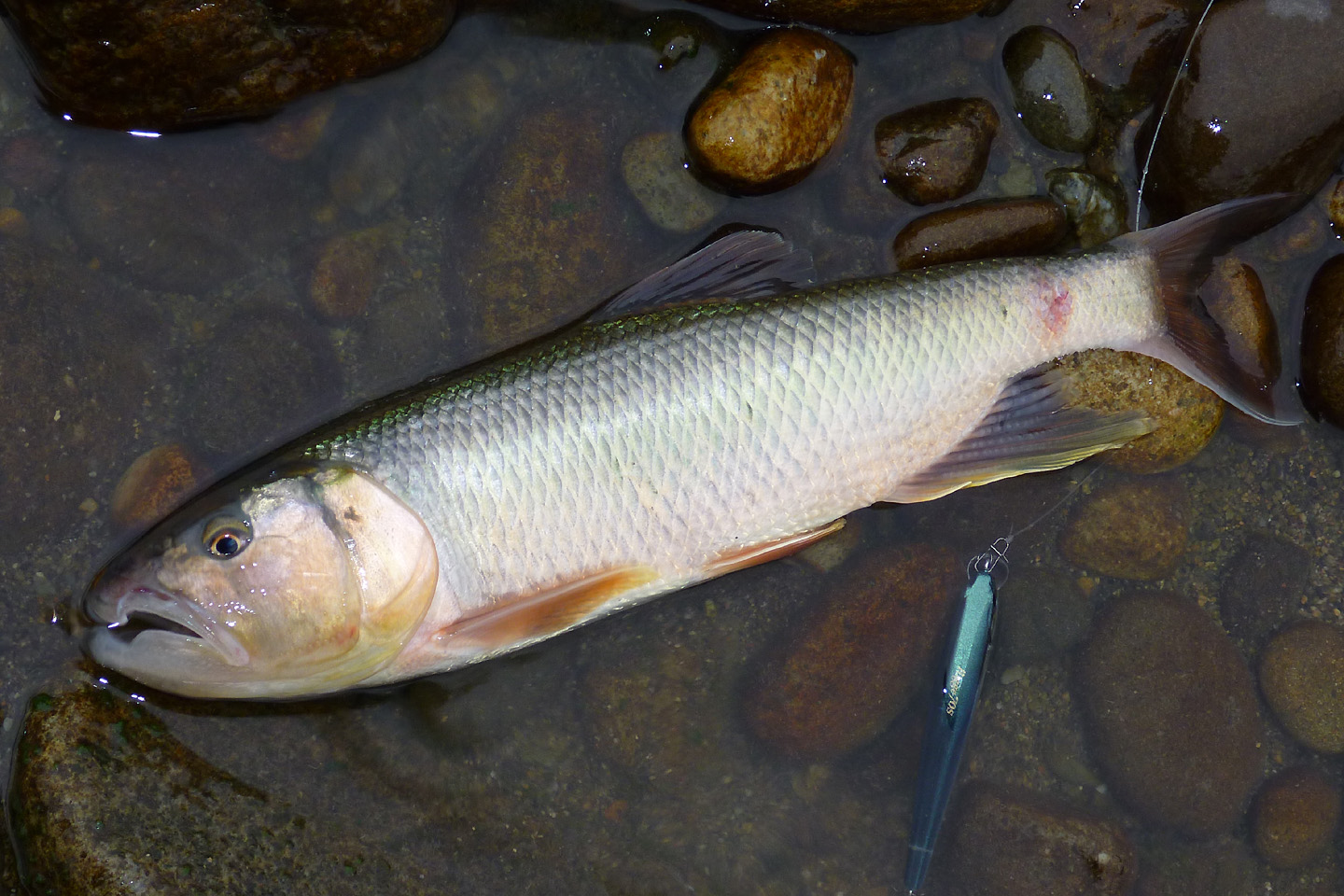
- Opsariichthys uncirostris

Scientific classification
- Kingdom: Animalia
- Phylum: Chordata
- Class: Actinopterygii
- Order: Cypriniformes
- Family: Xenocyprididae
- Genus: Opsariichthys; Bleeker, 1863

Type species
- Leuciscus uncirostris Temminck and Schlegel, 1846

= Opsariichthys =

Genus of fishes

Opsariichthys is a genus of freshwater ray-finned fish belonging to the family Xenocyprididae, the East Asian minnows or sharpbellies found in freshwater habitats in Mainland China (including Hainan), Taiwan, Japan, Korea, and Vietnam.

== Species ==
These are the species, some with uncertain status:

- Opsariichthys acutipinnis (Bleeker, 1871)
- Opsariichthys amurensis Berg 1932
- Opsariichthys bea Nguyen, 1987
- Opsariichthys bidens Günther, 1873
- Opsariichthys chengtui (Sh. Kimura, 1934)
- Opsariichthys dienbienensis V. H. Nguyễn & H. D. Nguyễn, 2000
- Opsariichthys duchuunguyeni Huynh T. Q. & I. S. Chen, 2013
- Opsariichthys evolans (D. S. Jordan & Evermann, 1902)
- Opsariichthys hainanensis Nichols & C. H. Pope, 1927
- Opsariichthys hieni T. T. Nguyen, 1987
- Opsariichthys iridescens X. Peng, J. J. Zhou & J. Q. Yang, 2024
- Opsariichthys jishuiensis Zha & Xu, 2025
- Opsariichthys kaopingensis I. S. Chen & J. H. Wu, 2009
- Opsariichthys macrolepis (Yang & Hwang, 1964)
- Opsariichthys minutus Nichols, 1926
- Opsariichthys pachycephalus Günther, 1868
- Opsariichthys rubriventris J. B. Chen, Y. T. Li, J. J. Zhou & J. J. Wang 2024
- Opsariichthys songmaensis V. H. Nguyễn & H. D. Nguyễn, 2000
- Opsariichthys uncirostris (Temminck & Schlegel, 1846) — three-lips, hasu (ハス)

The status of Opsariichthys bea and Opsariichthys hieni are uncertain; the former might belong to the genus Parazacco and the latter to Rasbora.
