= Opsariichthys dienbienensis =

Scientific classification
- Kingdom: Animalia
- Phylum: Chordata
- Class: Actinopterygii
- Order: Cypriniformes
- Family: Xenocyprididae
- Genus: Opsariichthys
- Species: O. dienbienensis

Binomial name
- Opsariichthys dienbienensis V. H. Nguyễn & H. D. Nguyễn, 2000

Species of fish

Opsariichthys dienbienensis freshwater ray-finned fish belonging to the family Xenocyprididae, the East Asian minnows or sharpbellies. It inhabits northern Vietnam and has a maximum male length of 12.2 centimetres (4.8 in) and maximum female length of 8.6 centimetres (3.4 in).
