= Opsariichthys kaopingensis =

Scientific classification
- Kingdom: Animalia
- Phylum: Chordata
- Class: Actinopterygii
- Order: Cypriniformes
- Family: Xenocyprididae
- Genus: Opsariichthys
- Species: O. kaopingensis

Binomial name
- Opsariichthys kaopingensis I. S. Chen & J. H. Wu, 2009

Species of fish

Opsariichthys kaopingensis is a species of freshwater ray-finned fish belonging to the family Xenocyprididae, the East Asian minnows or sharpbellies. It is endemic to southern Taiwan and has a maximum standard length of 11.4 centimetres (4.5 in). The specific name kaopingensis refers to its type locality, Kaoping River.
