= Opsariichthys hainanensis =

Scientific classification
- Kingdom: Animalia
- Phylum: Chordata
- Class: Actinopterygii
- Order: Cypriniformes
- Family: Xenocyprididae
- Genus: Opsariichthys
- Species: O. hainanensis

Binomial name
- Opsariichthys hainanensis Nichols & C. H. Pope, 1927

Species of fish

Opsariichthys hainanensis is a species of freshwater ray-finned fish belonging to the family Xenocyprididae, the East Asian minnows or sharpbellies. It is endemic to Hainan (China). It has a maximum standard length of 10.6 centimetres (4.2 in).
