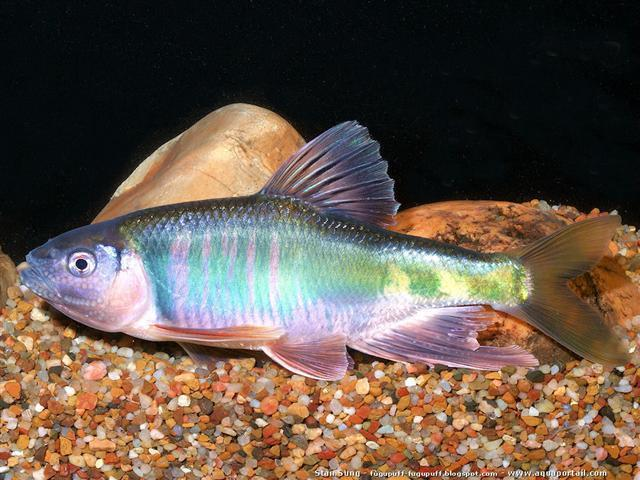

Conservation status
- Endangered (IUCN 3.1)

Scientific classification
- Kingdom: Animalia
- Phylum: Chordata
- Class: Actinopterygii
- Order: Cypriniformes
- Family: Xenocyprididae
- Genus: Opsariichthys
- Species: O. chengtui

Binomial name
- Opsariichthys chengtui (Sh. Kimura, 1934)

Synonyms
- Zacco chengtui Sh. Kimura, 1934

= Opsariichthys chengtui =

Species of fish

Zacco chengtui or Chengdu chub is a species of freshwater ray-finned fish belonging to the family Xenocyprididae, the East Asian minnows or sharpbellies. It inhabits Chengtu, Sichuan Province, China. It was described as Zacco chengtui in 1934 by Shigeru Kimura.
