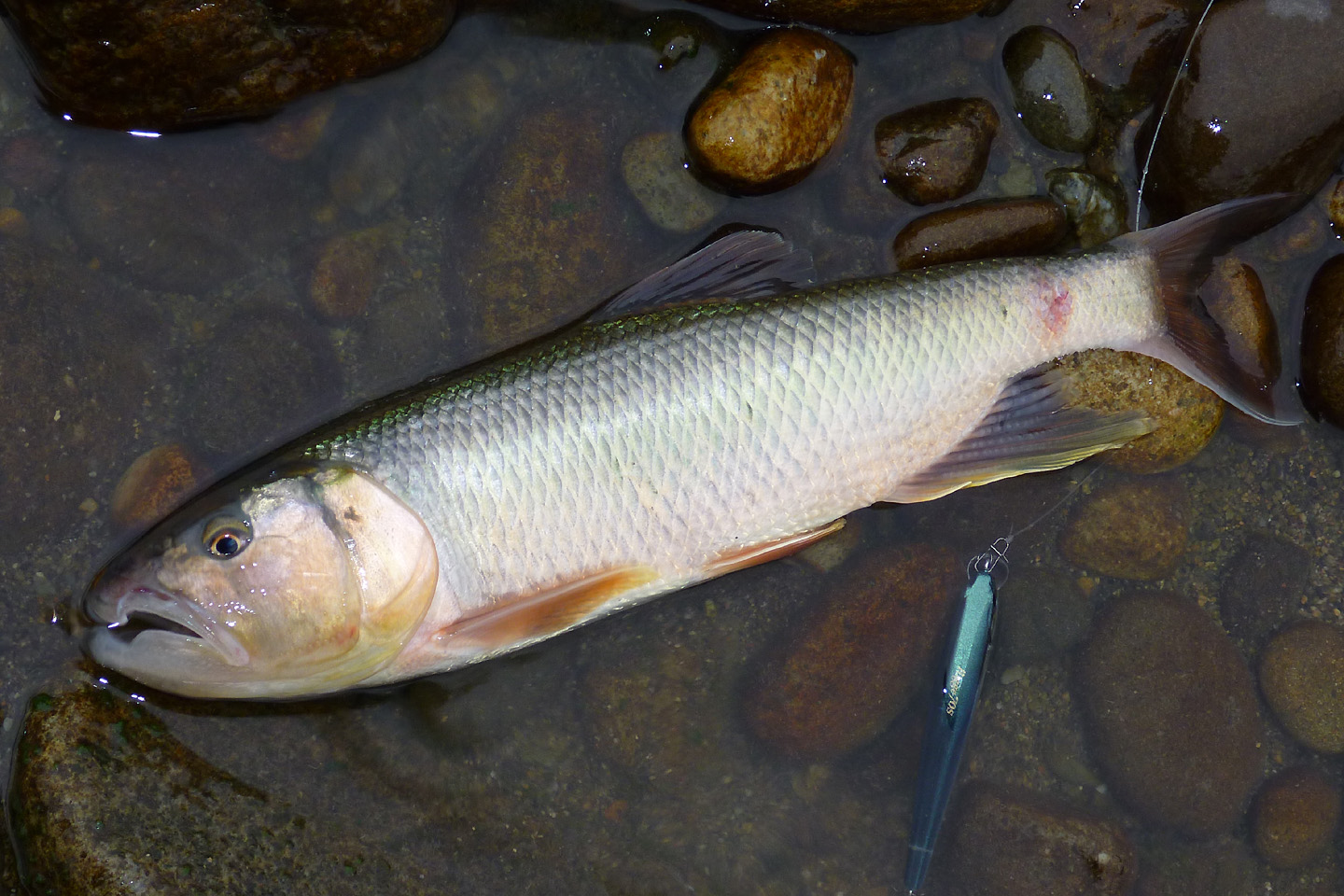

Conservation status
- Near Threatened (IUCN 3.1)

Scientific classification
- Kingdom: Animalia
- Phylum: Chordata
- Class: Actinopterygii
- Division: Teleostei
- Order: Cypriniformes
- Family: Xenocyprididae
- Genus: Opsariichthys
- Species: O. uncirostris

Binomial name
- Opsariichthys uncirostris (Temminck & Schlegel, 1846)

= Opsariichthys uncirostris =

Species of fish

Opsariichthys uncirostris, locally known as the kkeuli in Korean and commonly known as the piscivorous chub, the three-lipped chub, or the notched mouth chub, is a species of freshwater ray-finned fish belonging to the family Xenocyprididae, the East Asian minnows or sharpbellies. It is found in Siberia, China, Korea and Japan. It has a maximum length of 32.5 centimetres (12.8 in); males have a common length of 12.4 centimetres (4.9 in).
