= Midgut =

Embryonic structure from which most of the human intestines develop

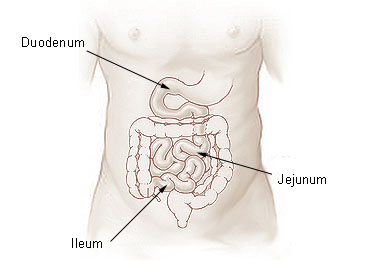
- The midgut and hindgut.

Details
- Carnegie stage: 10
- Precursor: Mesenchyme

Identifiers
- Latin: mesenteron
- TE: E5.4.7.0.0.0.2
- FMA: 45617

The midgut is the portion of the human embryo from which almost all of the small intestine and approximately half of the large intestine develop. After it bends around the superior mesenteric artery, it is called the "midgut loop". It comprises the portion of the alimentary canal from the end of the foregut at the opening of the bile duct to the hindgut, about two-thirds of the way through the transverse colon. In addition to representing an important distinction in embryologic development, the tissues derived from the midgut additionally have distinct vascular supply and innervation patterns in the adult gastrointestinal system.

== In the embryo ==
During standard human embryonic development, the midgut undergoes a process known as physiological herniation around week 6, when rapid growth forces the midgut to temporarily exit the abdominal cavity and reside in the extra-abdominal umbilical cord. At this stage, the midgut begins its initial counterclockwise rotation around the axis of the superior mesenteric artery (SMA). This rotation positions the cranial limb (destined to form parts of the small intestine) to the right and the caudal limb (which will give rise to parts of the colon) to the left.

Between weeks 10 and 12, the midgut retracts back into the abdominal cavity (leaving the umbilicus), undergoing an additional counterclockwise rotation, culminating in a total rotation of 270 degrees. This repositioning aligns the intestinal segments in their proper anatomical locations—for instance, placing the duodenojejunal junction in the left upper quadrant and the cecum in the right lower quadrant. Concurrently, the mesentery that supports the intestines becomes fixed to the posterior abdominal wall, ensuring proper stability and vascular supply; any disruptions in this intricate rotation and fixation process can lead to malrotation or other congenital anomalies.

== In the adult ==
=== Organs in the adult midgut ===
- Duodenum (distal half of 2nd part, 3rd and 4th parts)
- Jejunum
- Ileum
- Cecum
- Appendix
- Ascending colon
- Hepatic flexure of colon
- Transverse colon (proximal two-thirds)

=== Vascular, lymphatics and innervation ===
Arterial supply to the midgut is from the superior mesenteric artery, an unpaired branch of the aorta. Venous drainage is to the portal venous system. Lymph from the midgut drains to prevertebral superior mesenteric nodes located at the origin of the superior mesenteric artery from the aorta. Portal drainage carries all non-lipid nutrients from digestion to the liver for processing and detoxification, while lymphatic drainage carries fatty chyle to the cisterna chyli. Parasympathetic innervation of the midgut is from the superior mesenteric plexus, while sympathetic innervation is from the lesser splanchnic nerve.

== Clinical significance ==
- Malrotation of the midgut during development can lead to volvulus.
- Pain in the midgut is referred to the region around the belly button

As stated, in development a loop of midgut herniates outside of the abdominal cavity into the umbilical cord. If this persists after birth it is called an omphalocele. In omphalocele, there is a defect in the development of the anterior abdominal wall.

== See also ==
- Foregut
- Hindgut
