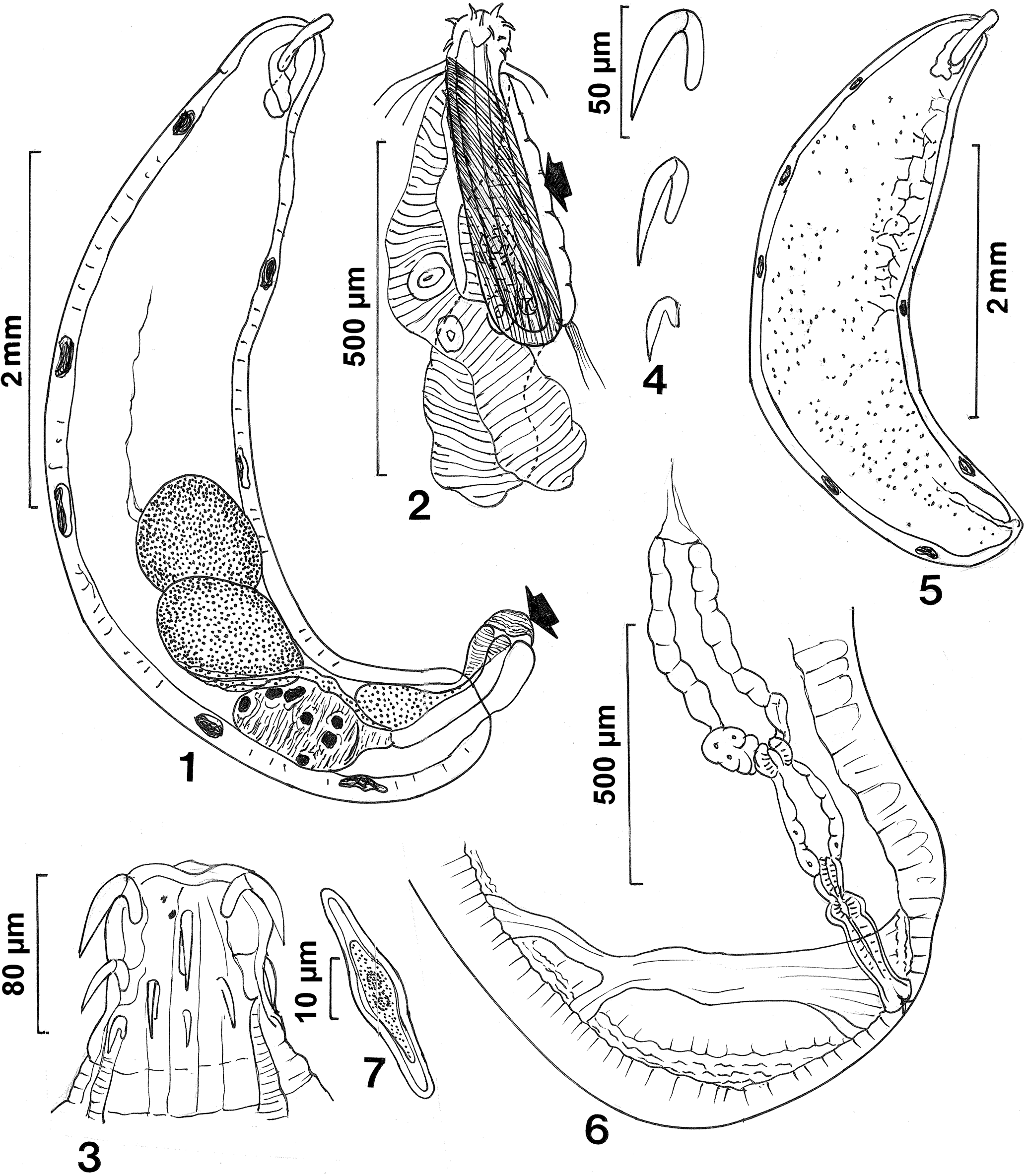
- Neoechinorhynchus (Hebesoma) spiramuscularis

Scientific classification
- Kingdom: Animalia
- Phylum: Acanthocephala
- Class: Eoacanthocephala
- Order: Neoechinorhynchida; Ward, 1917

Families
- Dendronucleatidae; Neoechinorhynchidae; Tenuisentidae

= Neoechinorhynchida =

Order of thorny-headed worms

Neoechinorhynchida is an order of parasitic worms from the phylum Acanthocephala. It contains 3 families:

- Dendronucleatidae Sokolovskaja, 1962
- Neoechinorhynchidae Ward, 1917
- Tenuisentidae Van Cleave, 1936
