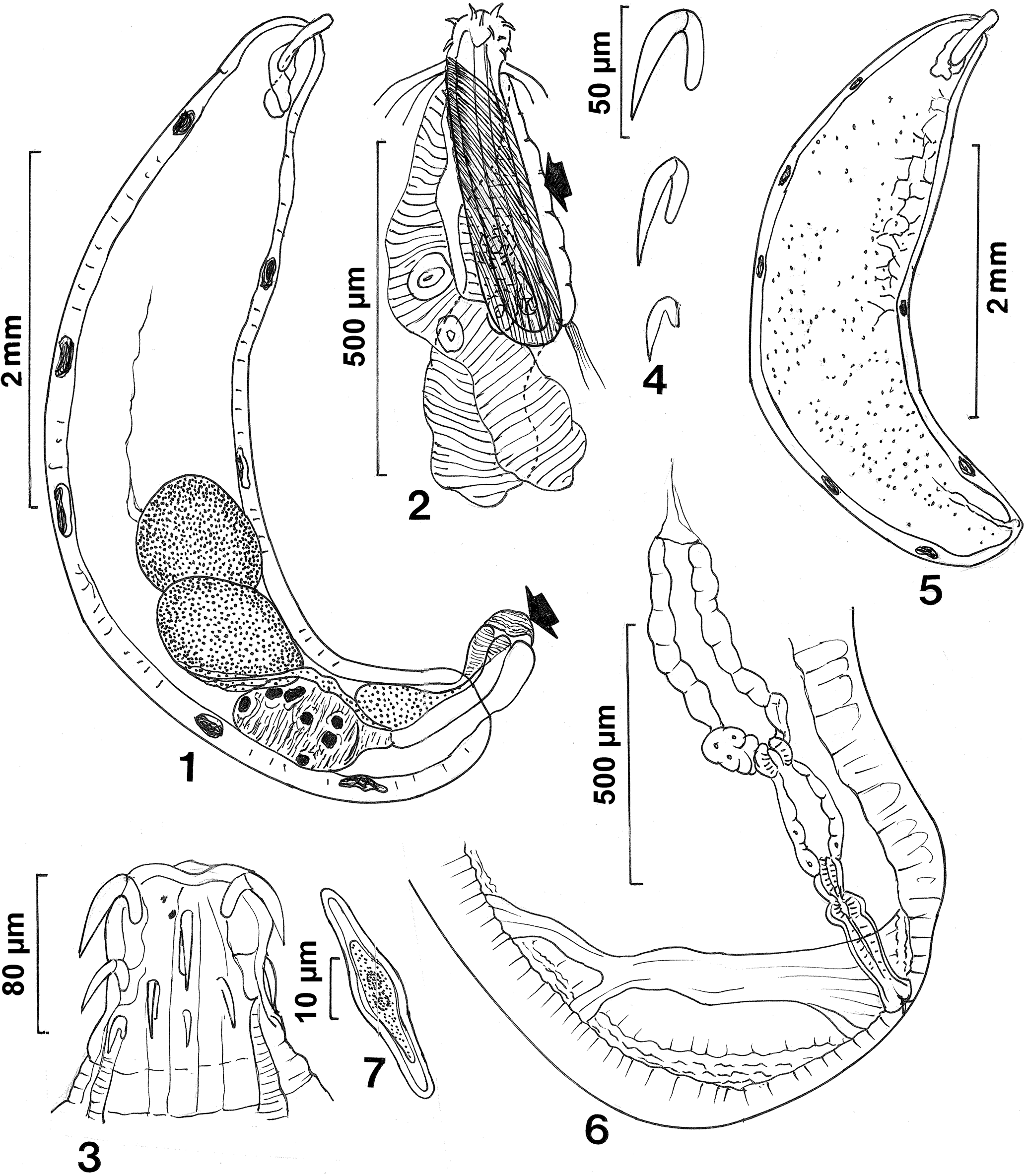
- Neoechinorhynchus (Hebesoma) spiramuscularis

Scientific classification
- Kingdom: Animalia
- Phylum: Acanthocephala
- Class: Eoacanthocephala
- Order: Neoechinorhynchida
- Family: Neoechinorhynchidae; Ward, 1917

Subfamilies
- Atactorhynchinae; Eocollinae; Gracilisentinae; Neoechinorhynchinae

= Neoechinorhynchidae =

Family of thorny-headed worms

Neoechinorhynchidae is a family of parasitic worms from the order Neoechinorhynchida.

== Species ==
Neoechinorhynchidae contains 4 subfamilies: Atactorhynchinae Petrochenko, 1956, Eocollinae Petrochenko, 1956, Gracilisentinae Petrochenko, 1956, Neoechinorhynchinae Ward, 1917. (Note: A binomial authority in parentheses indicates that the species was originally described in a genus other than the present genus.)

=== Mayarhynchus ===
The genus Mayarhynchus Pinacho-Pinacho, Hernández-Orts, Sereno-Uribe, Pérez-Ponce de León & García-Varela, 2017 differs from the other 17 genera in Neoechinorhynchidae by having a small proboscis. It has nine longitudinal rows of five hooks each, totaling 45 to 46 relatively weak rooted hooks. It contains only one species: Mayarhynchus karlae Pinacho-Pinacho, Hernández-Orts, Sereno-Uribe, Pérez-Ponce de León & García-Varela, 2017.

=== Atactorhynchinae Petrochenko, 1956 ===
==== Atactorhynchus ====
Atactorhynchus Chandler, 1935 has two species:

- Atactorhynchus duranguensis Salgado-Maldonado, Aguilar-Aguilar and Cabañas-Carranza, 2005

A. duranguensis has been found in the intestine of the Mezquital pupfish (Cyprinodon meeki) a fish from in-land Mexico. Diagnostic features include: body small, stout, ventrally curved; small cylindrical proboscis armed with 16 alternating vertical rows of four or five hooks; anterior two or three hooks conspicuous, stout and larger than other hooks, and have large, rod-shaped roots with a markedly and abruptly enlarged base; three posterior hooks of each row are smaller and rootless; single-walled proboscis receptacle; lemnisci equal in length, elongate and robust; and cement gland syncytial, larger than testis. The new species is smaller than A. verecundus with smaller hook lengths and slightly smaller proboscis. A. duranguensis is also shaped differently: it has a proboscis shape that is not widest at the apex, and the greatest width of the trunk is in about the middle contrasting A. verecundus where the trunk is widest posteriorly, and the proportion of large apical proboscis hooks in relation to the small basal hooks is different: the basal hooks of A. verecundus are about half the size of the anterior hooks and but only about a quarter of the size in A. duranguensis. Unlike A. verecundus, the base of the roots are markedly and abruptly enlarged in the new species. Finally, the eggs of the new species are smaller (23-27 x 8-10 um) than those of A. verecundus (27-30 x 12-13 um).

- Atactorhynchus verecundus Chandler, 1935

==== Floridosentis ====
- Floridosentis mugilis (Machado-Filho, 1951)
- Floridosentis pacifica Bravo-Hollis, 1969

==== Tanaorhamphus ====
- Tanaorhamphus longirostris (Van Cleave, 1913)

=== Eocollinae Petrochenko, 1956 ===
==== Eocollis ====
Eocollis Van Cleve, 1947 has three species:

- Eocollis arcanus Van Cleve, 1947
- Eocollis catostomi Buckner, 1992
- Eocollis harengulae Wang, 1981

=== Gracilisentinae Petrochenko, 1956 ===
==== Gracilisentis ====
Gracilisentis Van Cleave, 1919 contains 4 species:

- Gracilisentis gracilisentis (Van Cleave, 1913)
- Gracilisentis mugilis Gupta and Lata, 1967
- Gracilisentis sharmai (Gupta and Lata, 1967)
- Gracilisentis variabilis (Diesing, 1856)

==== Pandosentis ====
Pandosentis Van Cleve, 1920 has two species:

- Pandosentis iracundus Van Cleve, 1920
- Pandosentis napoensis Smales, 2007

==== Wolffhugelia ====
Wolffhugelia Mane-Garzon and Dei-Cas, 1974 has one species:

- Wolffhugelia matercula Mane-Garzon and Dei-Cas, 1974

=== Neoechinorhynchinae Ward, 1917 ===
==== Dispiron ====
Dispiron Bilqees, 1970 contains three species:

- Dispiron catlai Khan and Bilqees, 1987
- Dispiron heteroacanthus Khan and Bilqees, 1985
- Dispiron mugili Bilqees, 1970

==== Gorytocephalus ====
Gorytocephalus Nickol and Thatcher, 1971 contains four species:

- Gorytocephalus elongorchis Thatcher, 1979
- Gorytocephalus plecostomorum Nickol and Thatcher, 1971
- Gorytocephalus spectabilis (Machado-Filho, 1959)
- Gorytocephalus talaensis Vizcaino and Lunaschi, 1988

==== Microsentis ====
Microsentis Martin and Multani, 1966 contains 1 species:

- Microsentis wardae Martin and Multani, 1966

==== Neoechinorhynchus ====
Neoechinorhynchus Stiles and Hassall, 1905 has two subgenera, Hebesoma and Neoechinorhynchus, with many species.

==== Octospinifer ====
Octospinifer Van Cleave, 1919 has four species:

- Octospinifer macilentus Van Cleave, 1919
- Octospinifer rohitaii Zuberi and Farooqi, 1976
- Octospinifer torosus Van Cleave and Haderlie, 1950
- Octospinifer variabilis (Deising, 1851)

==== Octospiniferoides ====
Octospiniferoides Bullock, 1957 has three species:

- Octospiniferoides australis Schmidt and Hugghins, 1973
- Octospiniferoides chandleri Bullock, 1957
- Octospiniferoides incognita Schmidt and Hugghins, 1973

==== Paraechinorhynchus ====
Paraechinorhynchus Bilqees and Khan, 1983 has one species:

- Paraechinorhynchus kalriai Bilqees and Khan, 1983

==== Paulisentis ====
Paulisentis Van Cleave and Bangham, 1949 has two species:

- Paulisentis fractus Van Cleave & Bangham, 1949
- Paulisentis missouriensis Keppner, 1974

==== Zeylonechinorhynchus ====
Zeylanechinorhynchus Fernando and Furtado, 1963 contains only one species:

- Zeylonechinorhynchus longinuchalis Fernando and Furtado, 1963

== Hosts ==
Neoechinorhynchidae species parasitize fish.
