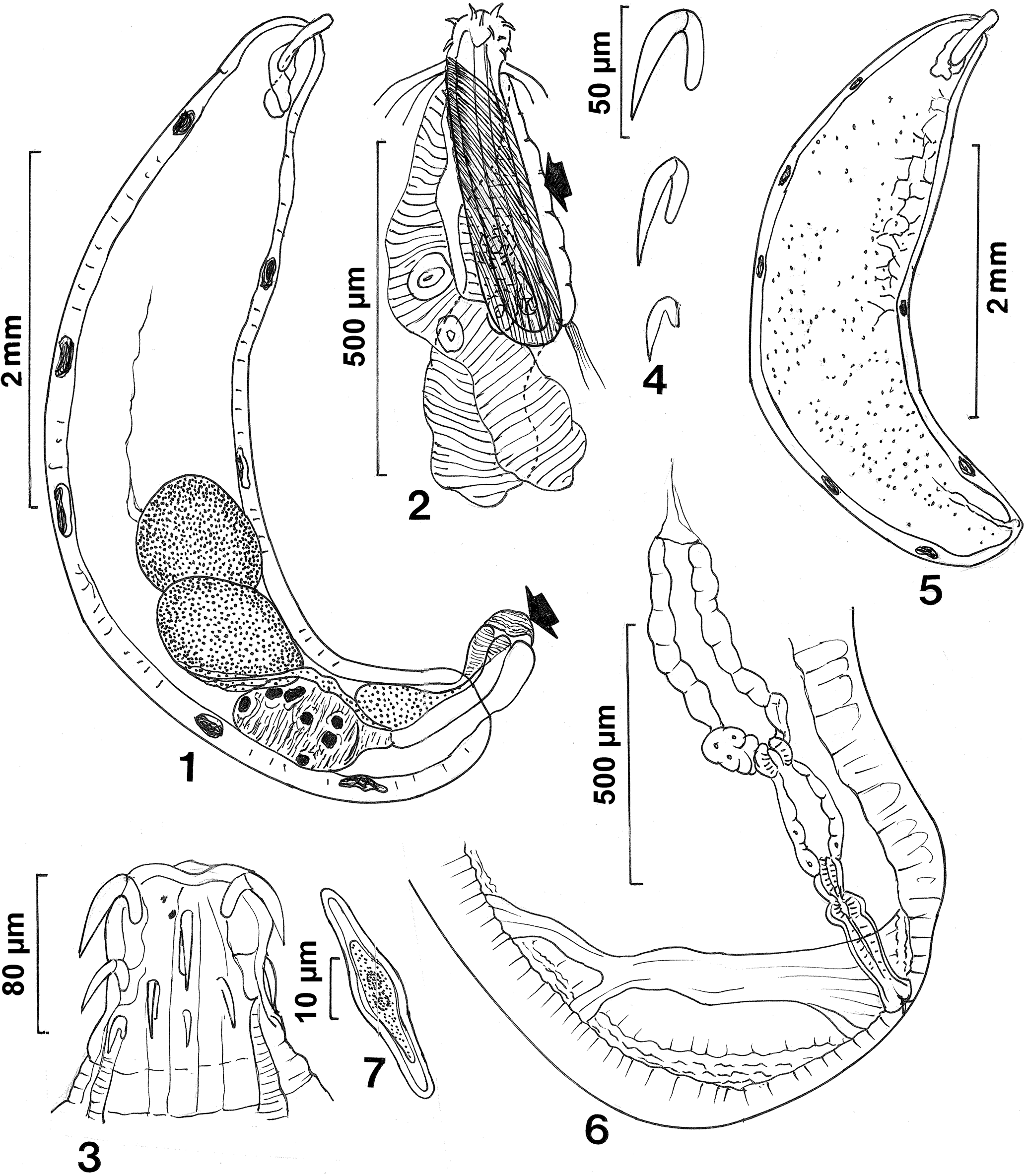
- Neoechinorhynchus (Hebesoma) spiramuscularis

Scientific classification
- Kingdom: Animalia
- Phylum: Acanthocephala
- Class: Eoacanthocephala; Van Cleave, 1936

Orders
- Gyracanthocephala; Neoechinorhynchida

= Eoacanthocephala =

Class of thorny-headed worms

Eoacanthocephala is a class of parasitic worms, within the phylum Acanthocephala. They feed on any aquatic cold-blooded creature such as turtles and fish. Their proboscis spines are arranged radially, with no protonephridia, and with persistent ligament sacs in female. The only reliable way to identify the group is that they only have one cement gland. This is a primitive characteristic and hence the name. The class contains 2 orders:

- Gyracanthocephala Van Cleave, 1936
- Neoechinorhynchida Southwell and Macfie, 1925
