= List of tautonyms =

The following is a list of tautonyms: zoological names of species consisting of two identical words (the generic name and the specific name have the same spelling). Such names are allowed in zoology, but not in botany, where the two parts of the name of a species must differ (though differences as small as one letter are permitted, as in cumin, Cuminum cyminum).

== Mammals ==
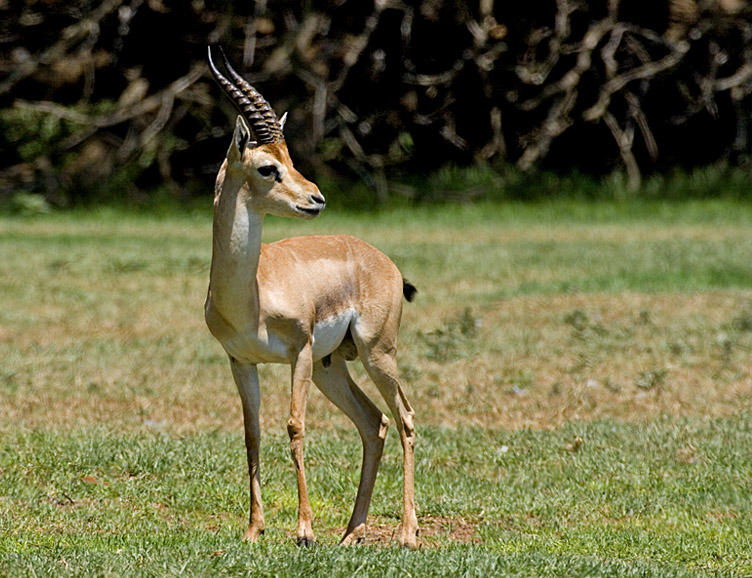
Gazella gazella

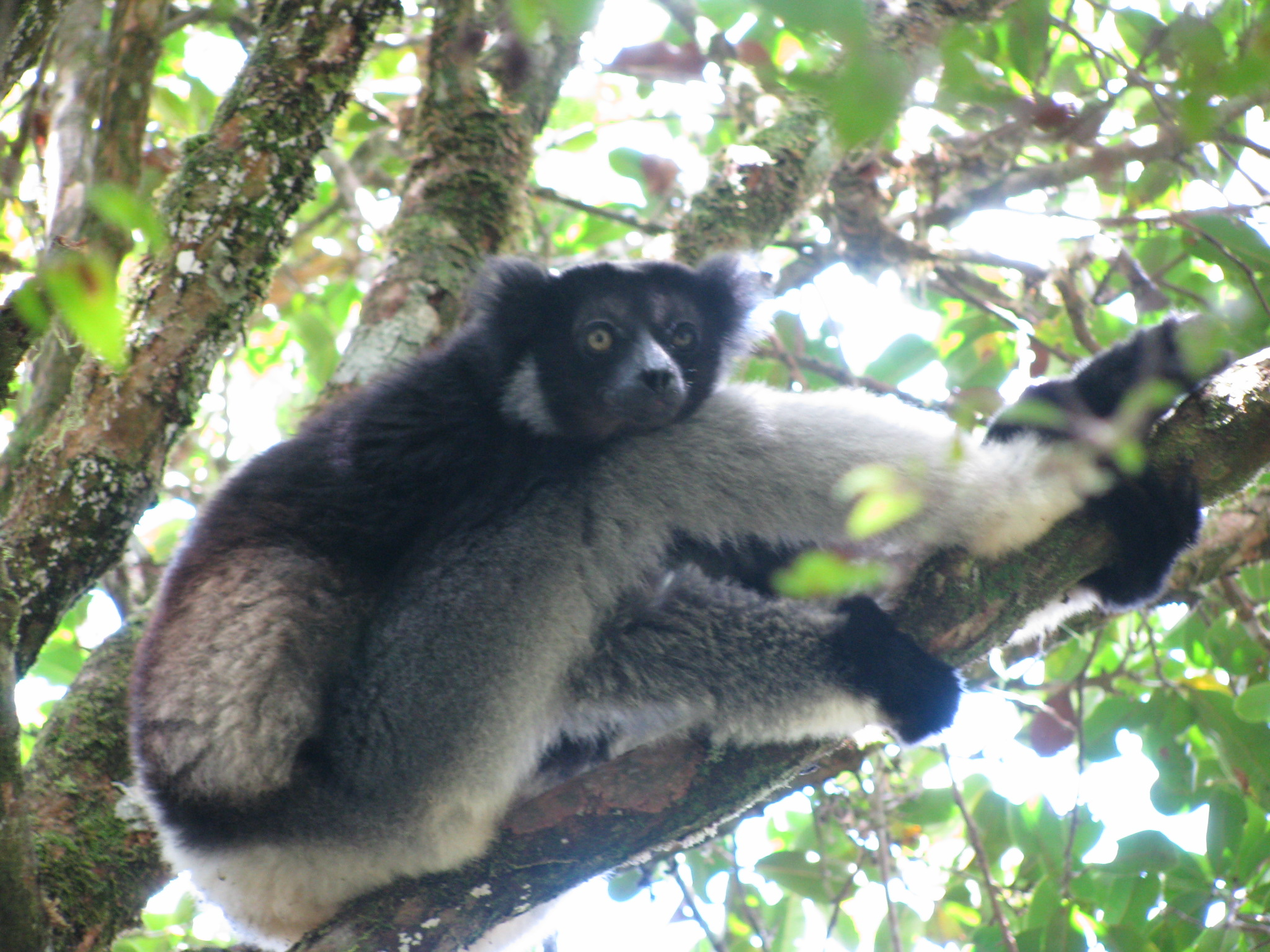
Indri indri — indri

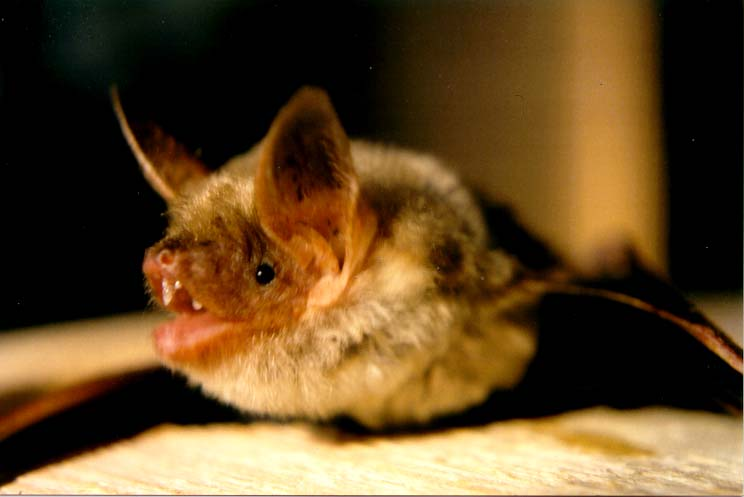
Myotis myotis

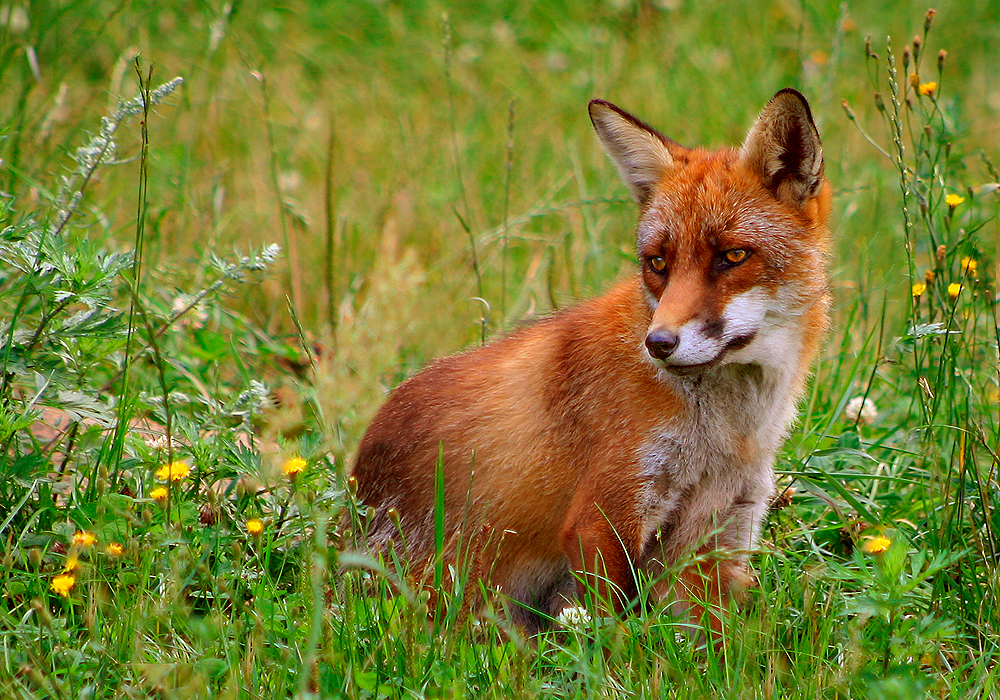
Vulpes vulpes

- Alces alces (Linnaeus, 1758) — Eurasian elk, moose
- †Arctomyoides arctomyoides (Douglass, 1903) — a Miocene ground squirrel
- Axis axis (Erxleben, 1777) — chital, axis deer
- Bison bison (Linnaeus, 1758) — American bison, buffalo
- Capreolus capreolus (Linnaeus, 1758) — European roe deer, roe deer
- Caracal caracal (Schreber, 1776) — caracal
- Chinchilla chinchilla (Lichtenstein, 1829) — short-tailed chinchilla
- Chiropotes chiropotes (Humboldt, 1811) — red-backed bearded saki
- Cricetus cricetus (Linnaeus, 1758) — common hamster, European hamster
- Crocuta crocuta (Erxleben, 1777) — spotted hyena
- Dama dama (Linnaeus, 1758) — European fallow deer
- Feroculus feroculus (Kelaart, 1850) — Kelaart's long-clawed shrew
- Gazella gazella (Pallas, 1766) — mountain gazelle
- Genetta genetta (Linnaeus, 1758) — common genet
- Gerbillus gerbillus (Olivier, 1801) — lesser Egyptian gerbil
- Giraffa giraffa (von Schreber, 1784) — southern giraffe
- Glis glis (Linnaeus, 1766) — European edible dormouse, European fat dormouse
- Gorilla gorilla (Savage, 1847) — western gorilla
- Gulo gulo (Linnaeus, 1758) — wolverine
- Hoolock hoolock (Harlan, 1834) — western hoolock gibbon
- Hyaena hyaena (Linnaeus, 1758) — striped hyena
- Indri indri (Gmelin, 1788) — indri
- Jaculus jaculus (Linnaeus, 1758) — lesser Egyptian jerboa
- Lagurus lagurus (Pallas, 1773) — steppe vole, steppe lemming
- Lemmus lemmus (Linnaeus, 1758) — Norway lemming
- Lutra lutra (Linnaeus, 1758) — European otter
- Lynx lynx (Linnaeus, 1758) — Eurasian lynx
- Macrophyllum macrophyllum (Schinz, 1821) — long-legged bat
- Marmota marmota (Linnaeus, 1758) — alpine marmot
- Martes martes (Linnaeus, 1758) — European pine marten, pine marten
- Meles meles (Linnaeus, 1758) — European badger, Eurasian badger
- Mephitis mephitis (Schreber, 1776) — striped skunk
- Molossus molossus (Pallas, 1766) — Pallas's mastiff bat
- Monachus monachus (Hermann, 1779) — Mediterranean monk seal
- Mops mops (de Blainville, 1840) — Malayan free-tailed bat
- Myospalax myospalax (Laxmann, 1773) — Siberian zokor
- Myotis myotis (Borkhausen, 1797) — mouse-eared myotis, greater mouse-eared bat
- Nasua nasua (Linnaeus, 1766) — South American coati, coatimundi
- Niviventer niviventer (Hodgson, 1836) — Himalayan niviventer, white-bellied rat
- †Nombe nombe (Flannery, Mountain, & Aplin, 1983) — a Pleistocene kangaroo
- Oreotragus oreotragus (Zimmermann, 1783) — klipspringer
- Papio papio (Desmarest, 1820) — Guinea baboon
- Petaurista petaurista (Pallas, 1766) — red giant flying squirrel
- Phocoena phocoena (Linnaeus, 1758) — harbour porpoise
- Pipistrellus pipistrellus (Schreber, 1774) — common pipistrelle
- Pithecia pithecia (Linnaeus, 1766) — white-faced saki
- Rattus rattus (Linnaeus, 1758) — black rat, roof rat
- Redunca redunca (Pallas, 1767) — bohor reedbuck
- Rupicapra rupicapra (Linnaeus, 1758) — chamois, Alpine chamois
- Saccolaimus saccolaimus (Temminck, 1838) — naked-rumped pouched bat
- Urva urva (Hodgson, 1836) — crab-eating mongoose
- Vulpes vulpes (Linnaeus, 1758) — red fox

== Birds ==
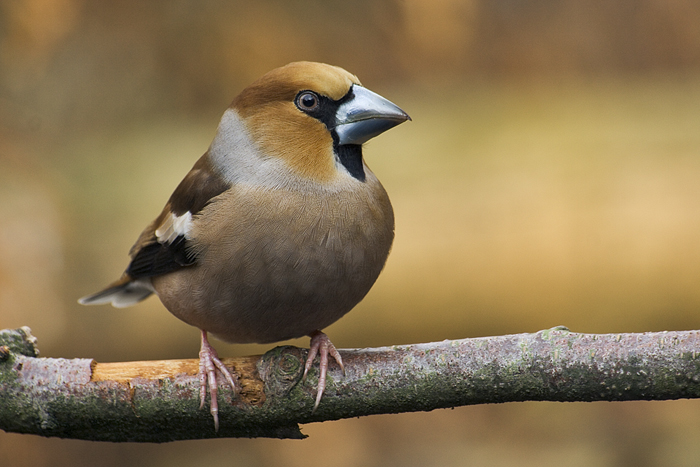
Coccothraustes coccothraustes

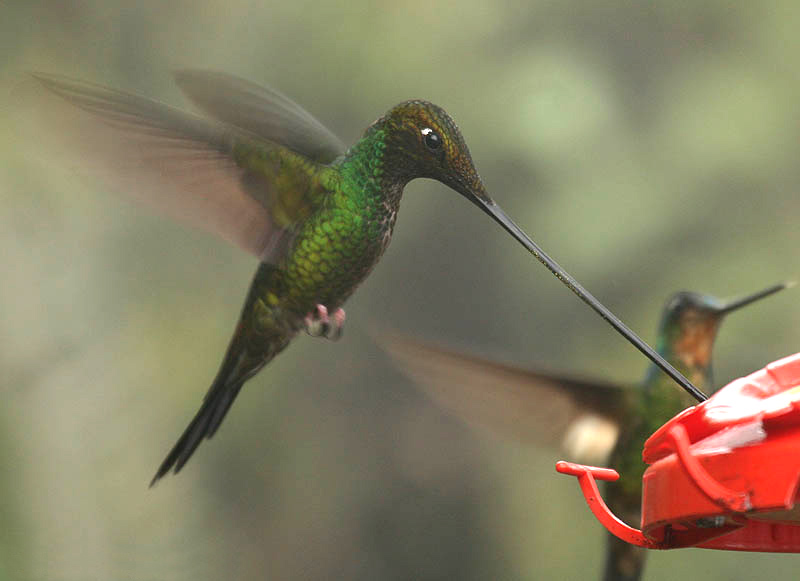
Ensifera ensifera

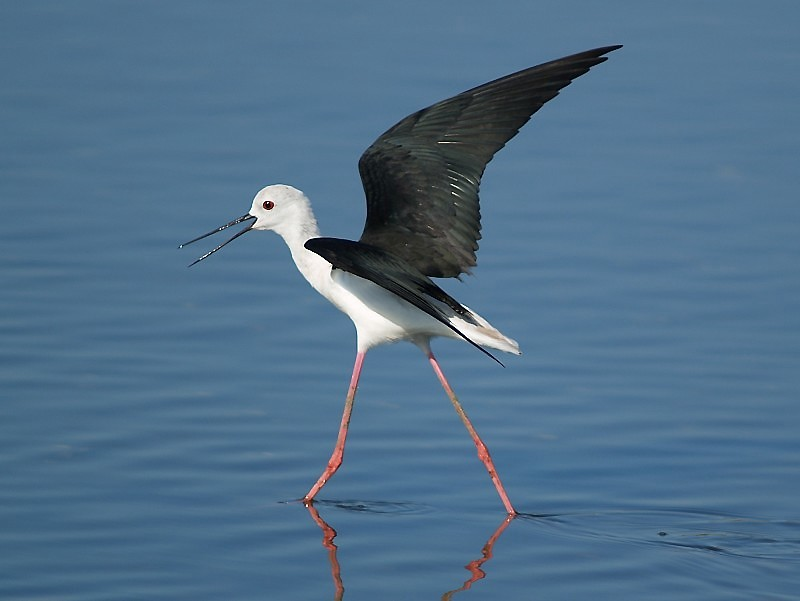
Himantopus himantopus

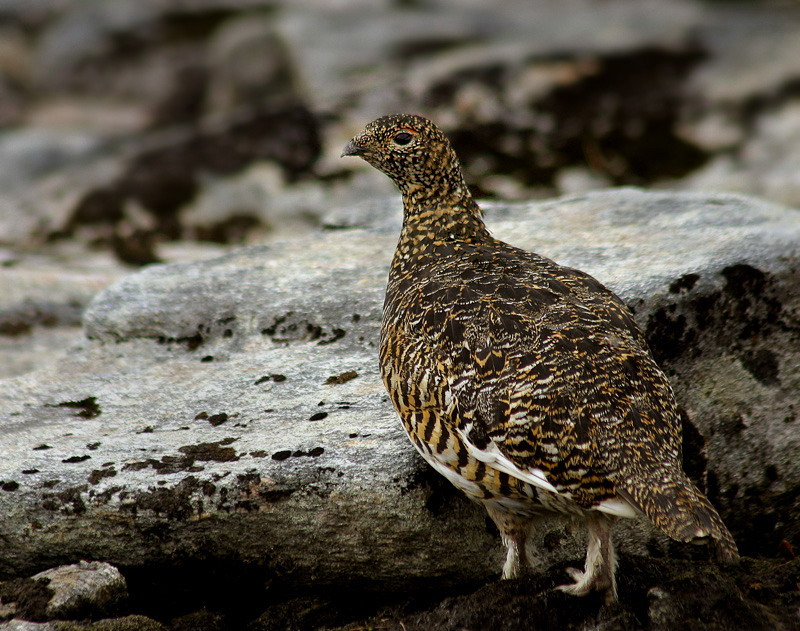
Lagopus lagopus

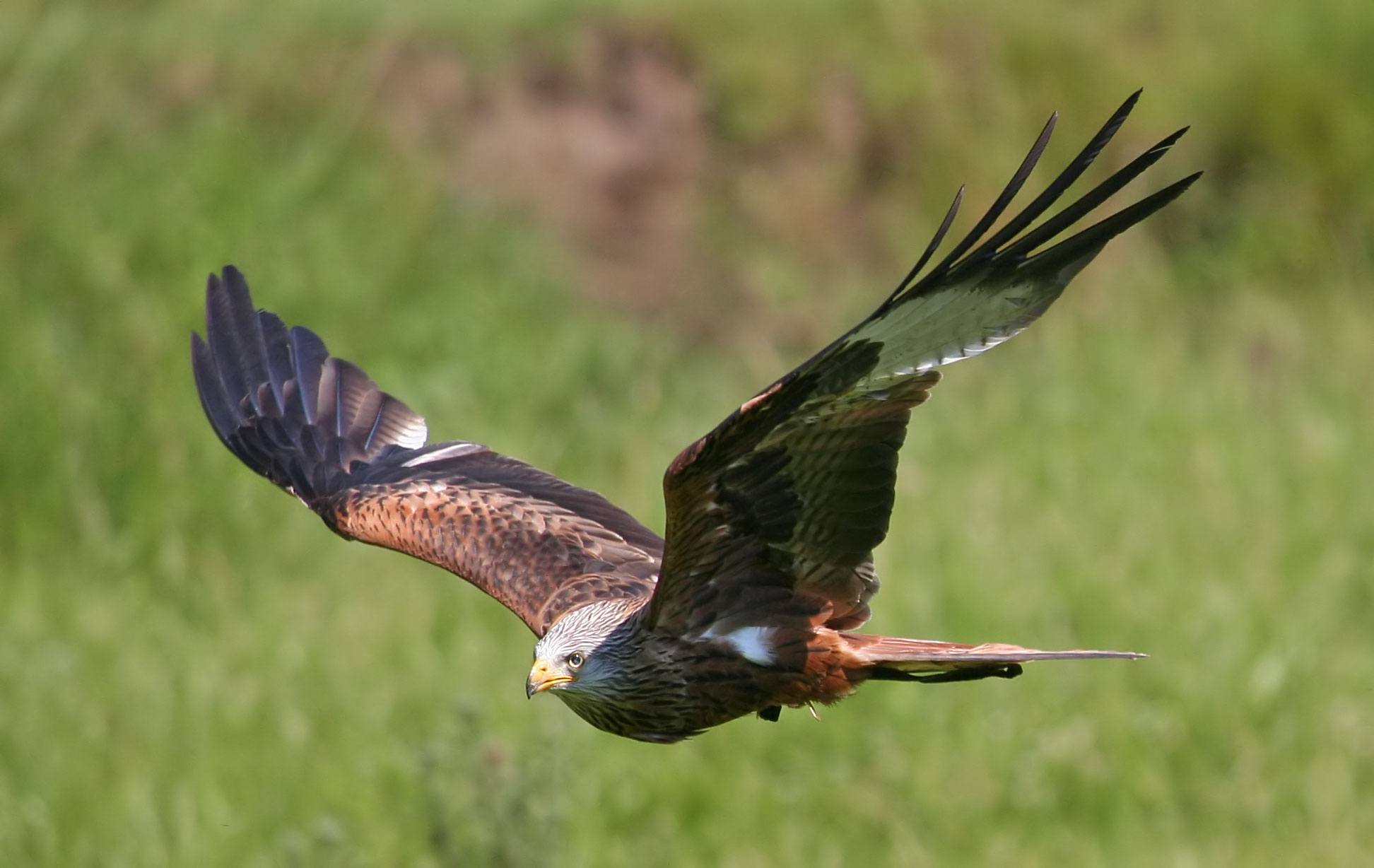
Milvus milvus

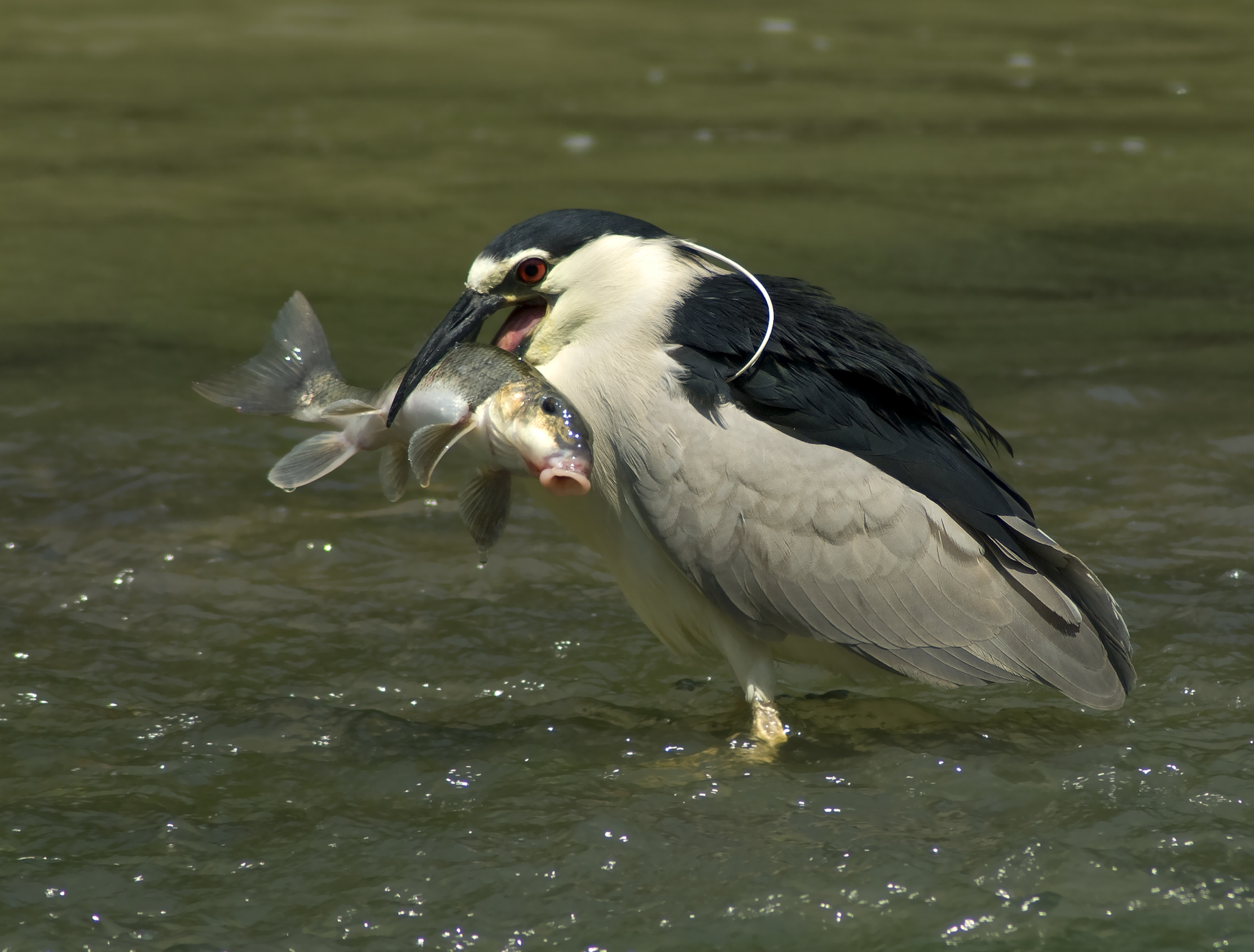
Nycticorax nycticorax

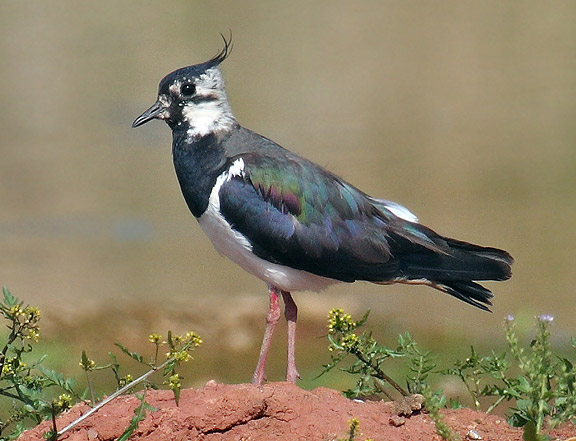
Vanellus vanellus

- Alle alle (Linnaeus, 1758) — little auk, dovekie
- Amandava amandava (Linnaeus, 1758) — red avadavat
- Anhinga anhinga (Linnaeus, 1766) — anhinga
- Anser anser (Linnaeus, 1758) — greylag goose
- Antigone antigone (Linnaeus, 1758) — sarus crane
- Apus apus (Linnaeus, 1758) — common swift
- Bubo bubo (Linnaeus, 1758) — Eurasian eagle-owl
- Buteo buteo (Linnaeus, 1758) — common buzzard
- Calliope calliope (Pallas, 1776) — Siberian rubythroat
- Cardinalis cardinalis (Linnaeus, 1758) — northern cardinal
- Carduelis carduelis (Linnaeus, 1758) — European goldfinch
- Casuarius casuarius (Linnaeus, 1758) — southern cassowary
- Chloris chloris (Linnaeus, 1758) — European greenfinch
- Ciconia ciconia (Linnaeus, 1758) — white stork
- Cinclus cinclus (Linnaeus, 1758) — white-throated dipper
- Clanga clanga (Pallas, 1811) — greater spotted eagle
- Coccothraustes coccothraustes (Linnaeus, 1758) — hawfinch
- Cochlearius cochlearius (Linnaeus, 1766) — boat-billed heron
- Coeligena coeligena (Lesson, 1833) — bronzy inca
- Colius colius (Linnaeus, 1766) — white-backed mousebird
- Coscoroba coscoroba (Molina, 1782) — coscoroba swan
- Cotinga cotinga (Linnaeus, 1766) — purple-breasted cotinga
- Coturnix coturnix (Linnaeus, 1758) — common quail
- Crex crex (Linnaeus, 1758) — corn crake, corncrake
- Crossoptilon crossoptilon (Hodgson, 1838) — white eared pheasant
- Curaeus curaeus (Molina, 1782) — austral blackbird
- Curruca curruca (Linnaeus, 1758) — lesser whitethroat
- Cyanicterus cyanicterus (Vieillot, 1819) — blue-backed tanager
- Cygnus cygnus (Linnaeus, 1758) — whooper swan
- Diuca diuca (Molina, 1782) — diuca finch
- Dives dives (Deppe, 1830) — melodious blackbird
- Ensifera ensifera (Boissonneau, 1840) — sword-billed hummingbird
- Erythrogenys erythrogenys (Vigors, 1831) — rusty-cheeked scimitar babbler
- Falcipennis falcipennis (Hartlaub, 1855) — Siberian grouse
- Francolinus francolinus (Linnaeus, 1766) — black francolin
- Galbula galbula (Linnaeus, 1766) — green-tailed jacamar
- Gallinago gallinago (Linnaeus, 1758) — common snipe
- Gallus gallus (Linnaeus, 1758) — red junglefowl
- Granatina granatina (Linnaeus, 1766) — violet-eared waxbill
- Grus grus (Linnaeus, 1758) — common crane
- Guira guira (Gmelin, 1788) — guira cuckoo
- Himantopus himantopus (Linnaeus, 1758) — black-winged stilt
- Histrionicus histrionicus (Linnaeus, 1758) — harlequin duck
- Ichthyaetus ichthyaetus (Pallas, 1773) — Pallas's gull
- Icterus icterus (Linnaeus, 1766) — Venezuelan troupial
- Incana incana (Sclater & Hartlaub, 1881) — Socotra warbler
- Indicator indicator (Sparrman, 1777) — greater honeyguide
- Jacana jacana (Linnaeus, 1766) — wattled jacana
- Lagopus lagopus (Linnaeus, 1758) — willow ptarmigan
- Lerwa lerwa (Hodgson, 1833) — snow partridge
- Leucogeranus leucogeranus (Pallas, 1773) — Siberian crane
- Limosa limosa (Linnaeus, 1758) — black-tailed godwit
- Luscinia luscinia (Linnaeus, 1758) — thrush nightingale
- Manacus manacus (Linnaeus, 1766) — white-bearded manakin
- †Mascarinus mascarinus (Linnaeus, 1771) — Mascarene parrot or mascarin
- Melanodera melanodera (Quoy & Gaimard, 1824) — white-bridled finch
- Milvus milvus (Linnaeus, 1758) — red kite
- Mitu mitu (Linnaeus, 1766) — Alagoas curassow
- Nycticorax nycticorax (Linnaeus, 1758) — black-crowned night heron
- Oenanthe oenanthe (Linnaeus, 1758) — northern wheatear
- Oriolus oriolus (Linnaeus, 1758) — Eurasian golden oriole
- Pampa pampa (Lesson, 1832) — wedge-tailed sabrewing
- Pauxi pauxi (Linnaeus, 1766) — helmeted curassow
- Perdix perdix (Linnaeus, 1758) — grey partridge
- Petronia petronia (Linnaeus, 1766) — rock sparrow
- Phoenicurus phoenicurus (Linnaeus, 1758) — common redstart
- Pica pica (Linnaeus, 1758) — Eurasian magpie
- Pipile pipile (Jacquin, 1784) — Trinidad piping guan
- Poliocephalus poliocephalus (Jardine & Selby, 1827) — hoary-headed grebe
- Porphyrio porphyrio (Linnaeus, 1758) — western swamphen
- Porphyrolaema porphyrolaema (Deville & Sclater, 1852) — purple-throated cotinga
- Porzana porzana (Linnaeus, 1766) — spotted crake
- Puffinus puffinus (Brünnich, 1764) — Manx shearwater
- Pyrilia pyrilia (Bonaparte, 1853) — saffron-headed parrot
- Pyrope pyrope (von Kittlitz, 1830) — fire-eyed diucon
- Pyrrhocorax pyrrhocorax (Linnaeus, 1758) — red-billed chough
- Pyrrhula pyrrhula (Linnaeus, 1758) — Eurasian bullfinch
- Quelea quelea (Linnaeus, 1758) — red-billed quelea
- Radjah radjah (Garnot & Lesson, 1828) — radjah shelduck
- Regulus regulus (Linnaeus, 1758) — goldcrest
- Riparia riparia (Linnaeus, 1758) — sand martin, bank swallow
- Rupicola rupicola (Linnaeus, 1766) — Guianan cock-of-the-rock
- Schoeniclus schoeniclus (Linnaeus, 1758) — common reed bunting
- Serinus serinus (Linnaeus, 1766) — European serin
- Spinus spinus (Linnaeus, 1758) — Eurasian siskin
- Suiriri suiriri (Vieillot, 1818) — suiriri flycatcher
- Sula sula (Linnaeus, 1766) — red-footed booby
- Tadorna tadorna (Linnaeus, 1758) — common shelduck
- Tchagra tchagra (Vieillot, 1816) — southern tchagra
- Temnurus temnurus (Temminck, 1825) — ratchet-tailed treepie
- Tetrax tetrax (Linnaeus, 1758) — little bustard
- Todus todus (Linnaeus, 1758) — Jamaican tody
- Tyrannus tyrannus (Linnaeus, 1758) — eastern kingbird
- Urile urile (Gmelin, 1789) — red-faced cormorant
- Vanellus vanellus (Linnaeus, 1758) — northern lapwing
- Xanthocephalus xanthocephalus (Bonaparte, 1826) — yellow-headed blackbird
- Xenopirostris xenopirostris (Lafresnaye, 1850) — Lafresnaye's vanga

== Reptiles ==
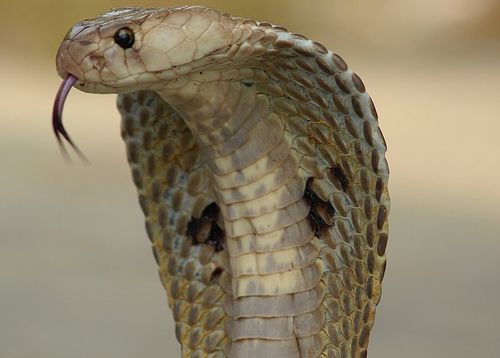
Naja naja

- Agama agama (Linnaeus, 1758) — rainbow agama
- Ameiva ameiva (Linnaeus, 1758) — giant ameiva
- Basiliscus basiliscus (Linnaeus, 1758) — common basilisk
- Calotes calotes (Linnaeus, 1758) — common green forest lizard
- Caretta caretta (Linnaeus, 1758) — loggerhead sea turtle
- Cerastes cerastes (Linnaeus, 1758) — desert horned viper
- Chalcides chalcides (Linnaeus, 1758) — Italian three-toed skink
- Clelia clelia (Daudin, 1803) — mussurana
- Cordylus cordylus (Linnaeus, 1758) — Cape girdled lizard
- Enhydris enhydris (Schneider, 1799) — rainbow water snake
- Hypnale hypnale (Merrem, 1820) — hump-nosed viper
- Iguana iguana (Linnaeus, 1758) — green iguana, common iguana
- Naja naja (Linnaeus, 1758) — Indian cobra
- Natrix natrix (Linnaeus, 1758) — grass snake
- Ophioscincus ophioscincus (Boulenger, 1887) — yolk-bellied snake-skink
- Plica plica (Linnaeus, 1758) — collared treerunner
- Scincus scincus (Linnaeus, 1758) — sandfish
- Suta suta (Peters, 1863) — curl snake
- Tetradactylus tetradactylus (Daudin, 1802) — long-toed seps

== Amphibians ==
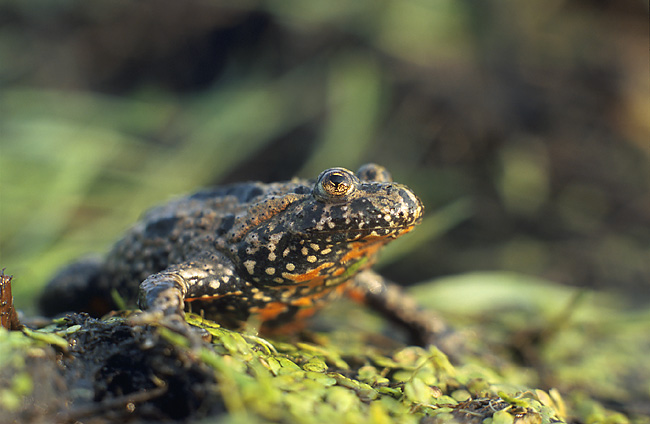
Bombina bombina

- Bombina bombina (Linnaeus, 1761) — European fire-bellied toad
- Bufo bufo (Linnaeus, 1758) — common toad
- Pipa pipa (Linnaeus, 1758) — Suriname toad
- Salamandra salamandra (Linnaeus, 1758) — fire salamander

== Fish ==
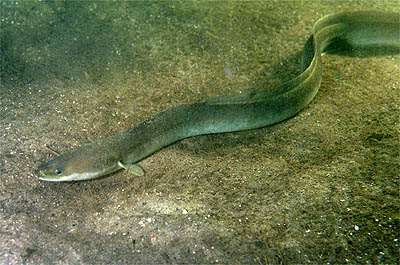
Anguilla anguilla

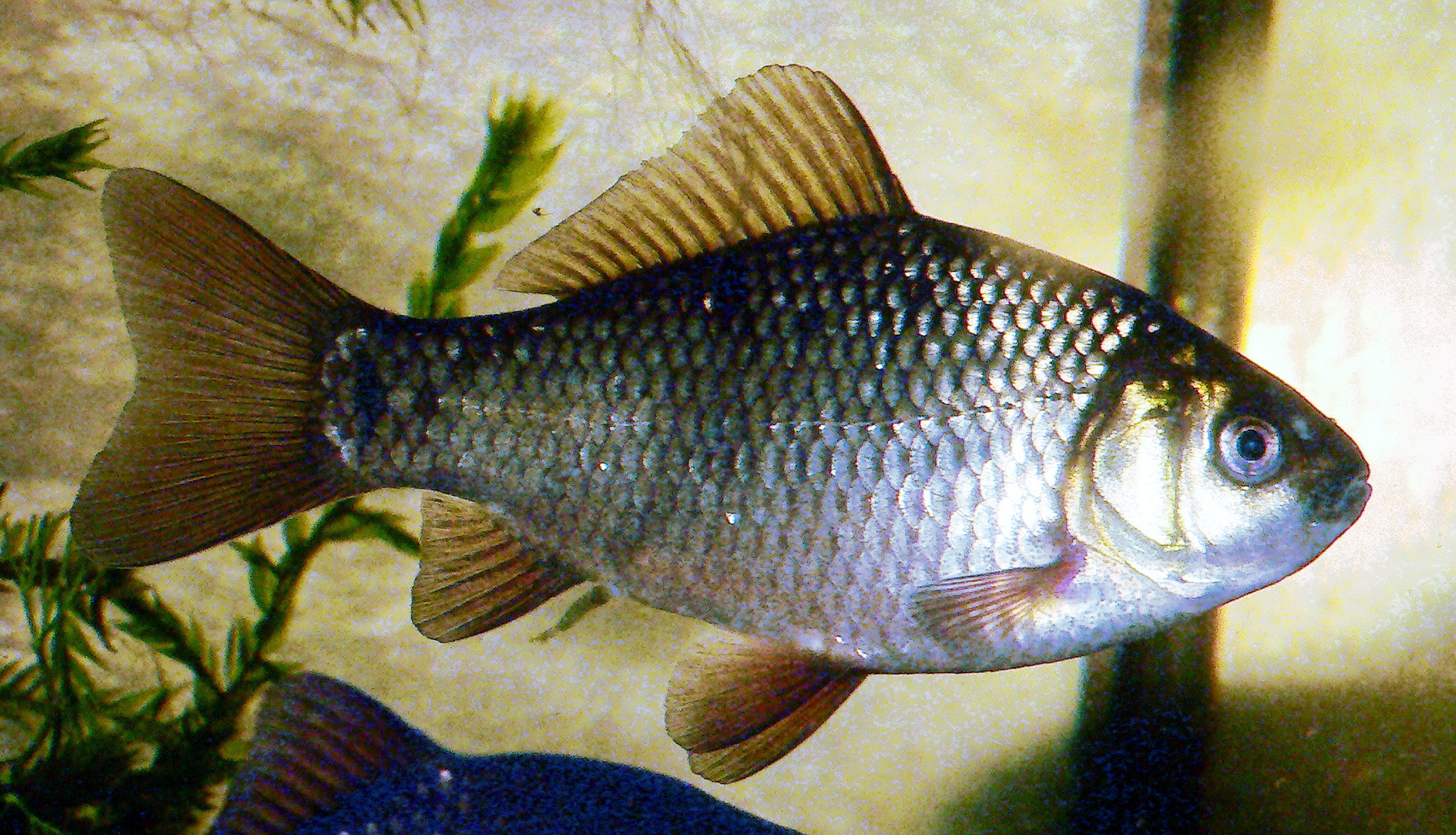
Carassius carassius

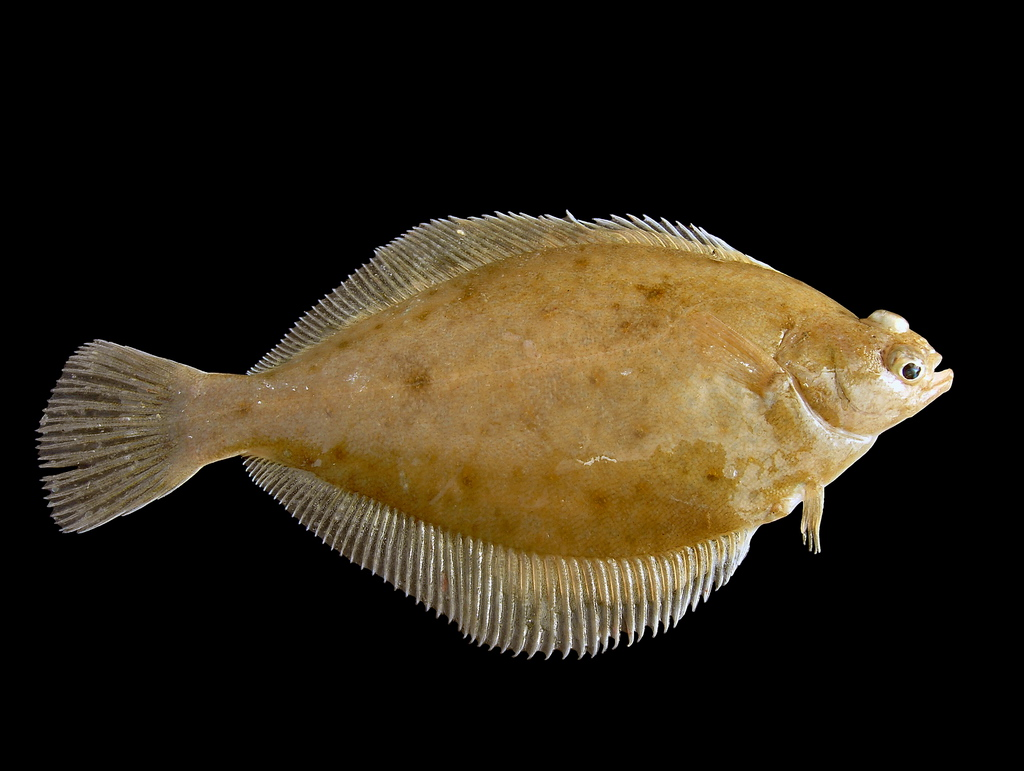
Limanda limanda

- Achirus achirus — drab American sole
- Alburnus alburnus — bleak
- Alosa alosa — allis shad
- Ambassis ambassis — Commerson's glassy
- Anableps anableps — largescale foureyes
- Anguilla anguilla — European eel
- Anostomus anostomus — striped headstander
- Anthias anthias — swallowtail seaperch
- Arius arius — threadfin sea catfish
- Aspredo aspredo — a banjo catfish
- Badis badis — blue perch, blue badis
- Bagarius bagarius — devil catfish, goonch
- Bagre bagre — coco sea catfish
- Banjos banjos — banjofish
- Barbatula barbatula — stone loach
- Barbus barbus — barbel
- Batasio batasio — a naked catfish
- Belobranchus belobranchus — throat-spine gudgeon
- Belone belone — garfish
- Bibarba bibarba — a loach
- Bidyanus bidyanus — silver perch
- Boops boops — bogue
- Brama brama — Atlantic pomfret
- Brosme brosme — cusk
- Butis butis — duckbill sleeper, crazy fish
- Calamus calamus — saucereye porgy
- Callichthys callichthys — cascarudo, armoured catfish
- Capoeta capoeta — Caucasian scraper, Sevan khramulya
- Carassius carassius — crucian carp
- Catla catla — catla
- Catostomus catostomus — longnose sucker
- Chaca chaca — frogmouth catfish
- Chandramara chandramara — a naked catfish
- Chanos chanos — milkfish
- Chitala chitala — Indian featherback
- Chromis chromis — Mediterranean damselfish, Mediterranean chromis
- Conger conger — European conger
- Conta conta — conta catfish
- Crenidens crenidens – karanteen seabream
- Cryptocentrus cryptocentrus — ninebar prawn-goby
- Cynoglossus cynoglossus — Bengal tonguesole
- Dactylopus dactylopus — fingered dragonet
- Dario dario — scarlet badis, scarlet dario
- Decorus decorus — a Chinese carp/minnow
- Dentex dentex — common dentex
- Dermatolepis dermatolepis — leather bass
- Devario devario — Bengal danio
- Erosa erosa — pitted stonefish
- Erythrinus erythrinus — red wolffish
- Gagata gagata — a sisorid catfish
- Genidens genidens — Guri sea catfish, marine catfish
- Glyphis glyphis — speartooth shark
- Gobio gobio — gudgeon
- Gonorynchus gonorynchus — mousefish, beaked sandfish, beaked salmon
- Hara hara — a South Asian river catfish
- Hemilepidotus hemilepidotus — red Irish lord
- Hippocampus hippocampus — short-snouted seahorse
- Hippoglossus hippoglossus — Atlantic halibut
- Histrio histrio — sargassum fish
- Hucho hucho — Danube salmon, huchen
- Hudsonius hudsonius — spottail shiner
- Huso huso — beluga sturgeon
- Katria katria — a Madagascan cichlid
- Lactarius lactarius — false trevally
- Lagocephalus lagocephalus — oceanic puffer
- Lepadogaster lepadogaster — shore clingfish
- Leuciscus leuciscus — common dace
- Limanda limanda — common dab
- Liparis liparis — common seasnail
- Lithognathus lithognathus — white steenbras
- Lota lota — burbot
- Lutjanus lutjanus — bigeye snapper
- Mastacembelus mastacembelus — Euphrates spiny eel
- Menidia menidia — Atlantic silverside
- Merluccius merluccius — European hake
- Microstoma microstoma — slender argentine
- Mogurnda mogurnda — northern trout gudgeon
- Mola mola — ocean sunfish
- Molva molva — common ling
- Mustelus mustelus — common smooth-hound
- Myaka myaka — myaka
- Nangra nangra — a sisorid catfish
- Notopterus notopterus — bronze featherback
- Oligolepis oligolepis — sharptail goby
- Oplopomus oplopomus — spinecheek goby
- Pagrus pagrus — red porgy
- Pangasius pangasius — pangas catfish
- Phoxinus phoxinus — Eurasian minnow
- Phycis phycis — forkbeard
- Pinjalo pinjalo — pinjalo
- Pollachius pollachius — pollack
- Pristis pristis — largetooth sawfish
- Pseudobagarius pseudobagarius — a stream catfish
- Pungitius pungitius — ninespine stickleback
- Rama rama — a naked catfish
- Rasbora rasbora — Gangetic scissortail rasbora
- Remora remora — common remora
- Retropinna retropinna — New Zealand smelt
- Rhinobatos rhinobatos — common guitarfish
- Rita rita — rita
- Rubicundus rubicundus — a hagfish
- Rutilus rutilus — common roach
- Sarda sarda — Atlantic bonito
- Semiplotus semiplotus — Assamese kingfish
- Solea solea — common sole
- Sphyraena sphyraena — European barracuda
- Spinachia spinachia — sea stickleback
- Sprattus sprattus — European sprat
- Squatina squatina — angelshark
- Strongylura strongylura — spottail needlefish
- Synodus synodus — diamond lizardfish
- Tandanus tandanus — eel-tailed catfish
- Thymallus thymallus — grayling
- Tinca tinca — tench
- Tor tor — red finned mahseer, tor barb
- Torpedo torpedo — common torpedo
- Trachurus trachurus — Atlantic horse mackerel
- Trachycorystes trachycorystes — black catfish
- Tropheops tropheops — golden tropheops
- Uraspis uraspis — whitemouth jack
- Vimba vimba — vimba bream
- Zebrus zebrus — zebra goby
- Zingel zingel — zingel
- Zungaro zungaro — gilded catfish

== Arthropods ==
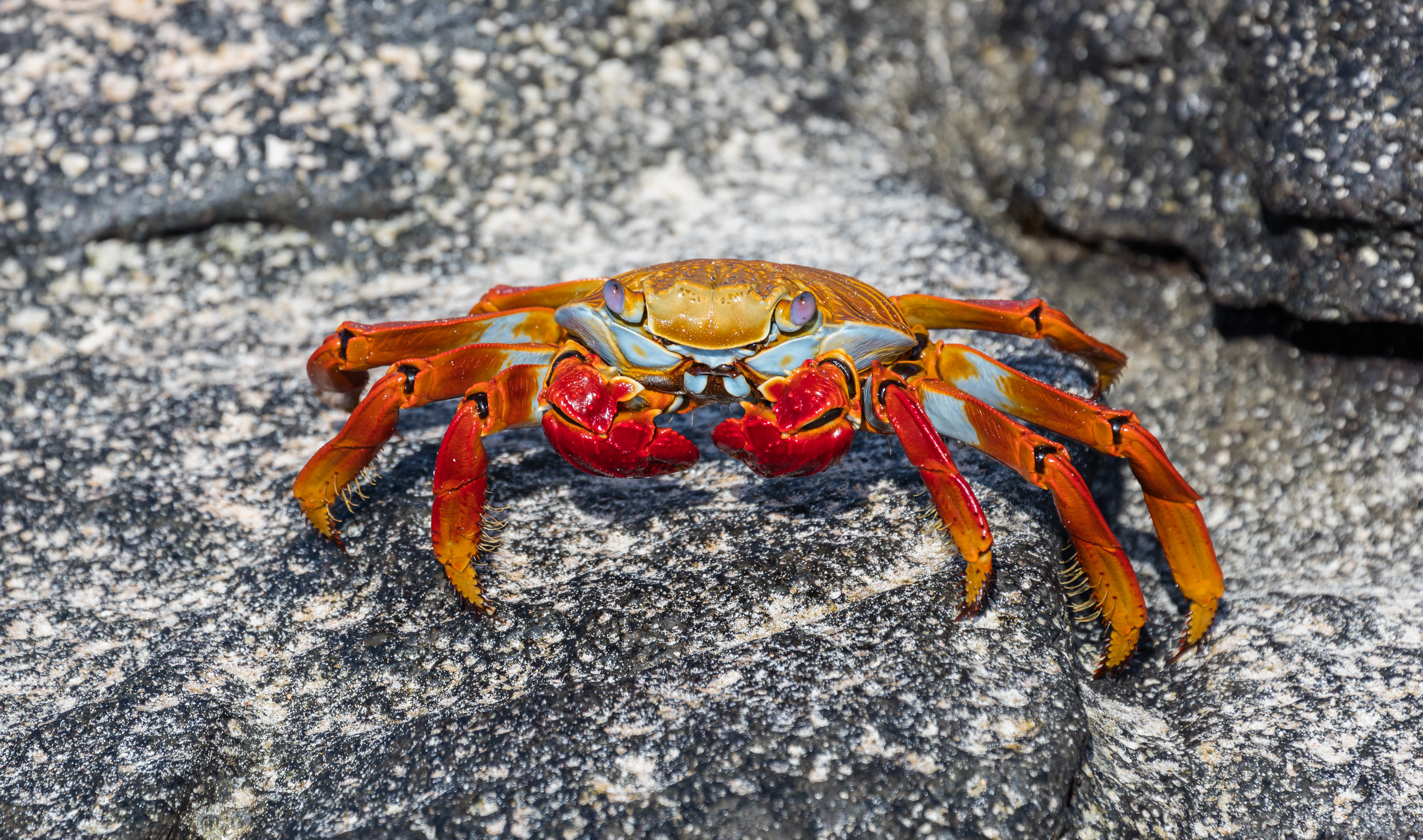
Grapsus grapsus

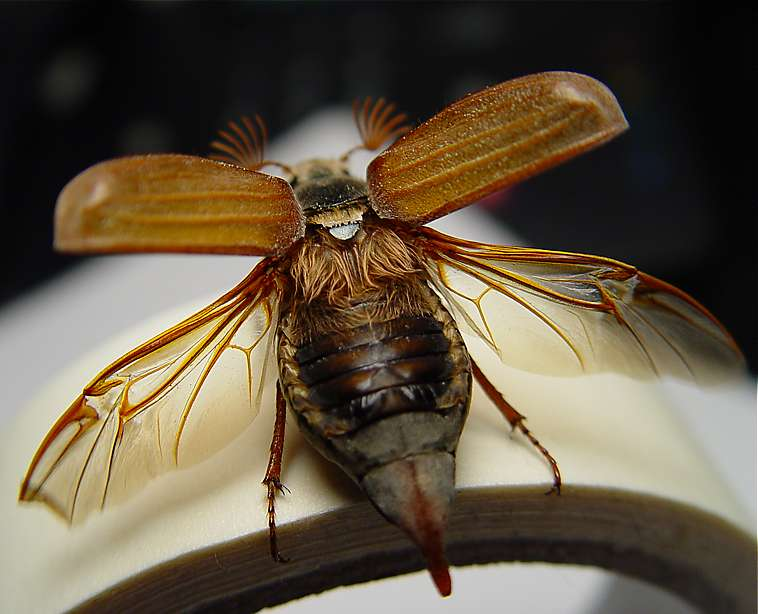
Melolontha melolontha

- Aniculus aniculus — a hermit crab
- Anthrax anthrax — a bee fly
- Appia appia — appia skipper
- Ariadne ariadne — angled castor (a brush-footed butterfly)
- Arita arita — arita skipper
- Aroma aroma — aroma skipper
- Aspitha aspitha — aspitha firetip (a skipper)
- Astacus astacus — European crayfish
- Avicularia avicularia — pinktoe tarantula
- Balanus balanus — a barnacle
- Bruna bruna — a skipper
- Bucayana bucayana — a cranaid harvestman
- Cactus cactus — a water flea
- Calappa calappa — smooth box crab
- Caleta caleta — angled Pierrot (a gossamer-winged butterfly)
- Cedusa cedusa — a derbid planthopper
- Cephise cephise — a skipper
- Clibanarius clibanarius — a hermit crab
- Conocephalus conocephalus — a bush cricket
- Corticea corticea — redundant skipper
- Cossus cossus — goat moth
- Crangon crangon — brown shrimp
- Cressida cressida — big greasy or clearwing swallowtail
- Cumbre cumbre — a skipper
- Cynea cynea — cynea skipper
- Danis danis — large green-banded blue (a gossamer-winged butterfly)
- Decinea decinea — decinea or Huastecan skipper
- Ebusus ebusus — ebusus skipper
- Ephippiger ephippiger — saddle-backed bush cricket
- Erina erina — small dusky-blue (a gossamer-winged butterfly)
- Flandria flandria — small flandria (a skipper)
- Furcula furcula — sallow kitten (a notodontid moth)
- Gesta gesta — impostor duskywing (a skipper)
- Grapsus grapsus — red rock crab
- Gryllotalpa gryllotalpa — European mole cricket
- Idea idea — Linnaeus's idea (a brush-footed butterfly)
- Joanna joanna — Joanna's skipper
- Lamponia lamponia — a skipper
- Lento lento — a skipper
- Levina levina — a skipper
- Librita librita — librita skipper
- Ludens ludens — ludens skipper
- Mashuna mashuna — Mashuna ringlet (a brush-footed butterfly)
- Megacephala megacephala — big-headed tiger beetle
- Melolontha melolontha — common cockchafer
- Menander menander — menander metalmark
- Meza meza — common missile (a skipper)
- Misius misius — misius skipper
- Moeros moeros — a skipper
- Molla molla — a skipper
- Mortola mortola — a solifuge
- Narcosius narcosius — a skipper
- Neita neita — neita brown (a brush-footed butterfly)
- Nyctelius nyctelius — violet-banded or nyctelius skipper
- Orthos orthos — orthos skipper
- Pamba pamba — a skipper
- Passova passova — passova firetip (a skipper)
- Perforatus perforatus - a barnacle
- Pilosa pilosa — a zalmoxid harvestman
- Plumbago plumbago — a skipper
- Pollicipes pollicipes — a goose barnacle
- Polyctor polyctor — polyctor tufted-skipper
- Pompeius pompeius — pompeius skipper
- Propertius propertius — propertius skipper
- Protesilaus protesilaus — great kite-swallowtail
- Punta punta — a skipper
- Racta racta — racta skipper
- Ranina ranina — red frog crab
- Repens repens — a skipper
- Ridens ridens — frosted skipper
- Roche roche – an ochyroceratid spider
- Sacrator sacrator — a skipper
- Salatis salatis — variable scarlet-eye (a skipper)
- Saturnus saturnus — a skipper
- Scalpellum scalpellum — a goose barnacle
- Scolytus scolytus — large elm bark beetle
- Sodreana sodreana — a gonyleptid harvestman
- Speculum speculum — hidden mirror skipper
- Sucova sucova — sucova skipper
- Tosta tosta — a skipper
- Tromba tromba — a skipper
- Turmada turmada — a skipper
- Vermileo vermileo — a wormlion
- Vidius vidius — a skipper
- Xanthopygus xanthopygus — a rove beetle
- Xanthostigma xanthostigma — a snakefly
- Zera zera — zera skipper
- Zingha zingha — a brush-footed butterfly
- Zoma zoma — a ray spider
- Zonia zonia — zonia skipper
- Zygoneura zygoneura — a dark-winged fungus gnat

== Molluscs ==
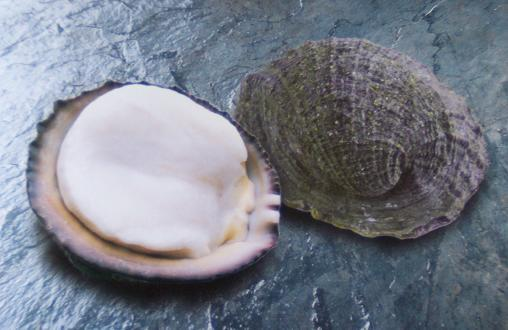
Concholepas concholepas

- Achatina achatina — African giant snail, giant tiger land snail
- Agagus agagus
- Anatina anatina - smooth duckclam
- Arcinella arcinella — Caribbean spiny jewel box
- Belonimorphis belonimorphis
- Columella columella
- Concholepas concholepas — loco or Chilean abalone
- Conventus conventus — Arctic-alpine pea clam
- Cymbiola cymbiola — crown volute
- Cymbium cymbium — false elephant's snout volute
- Digitaria digitaria
- Dolabrifera dolabrifera
- Ensis ensis — razor clam
- Extra extra
- Faustina faustina
- Ficus ficus — paper fig shell
- Fragum fragum — white strawberry cockle
- Gemma gemma — amethyst gem clam
- Gibberulus gibberulus — humpbacked conch
- Glycymeris glycymeris — dog cockle
- Harpa harpa — true harp
- Haustellum haustellum
- Hippopus hippopus — bear paw clam or horse's hoof clam
- Irus irus — irus clam
- Janthina janthina — violet snail
- Koilofera koilofera
- Lambis lambis — a spider conch
- Lima lima — spiny fileclam
- Lithophaga lithophaga — date mussel
- Lotoria lotoria — black-spotted snail
- Lucerna lucerna
- Lutraria lutraria — otter shell
- Mandarina mandarina
- Margaritifera margaritifera — freshwater pearl mussel
- Melo melo — Indian volute or melon shell
- Melongena melongena — Caribbean crown conch
- Mercenaria mercenaria — northern quahog, hard clam
- Meretrix meretrix
- Mitra mitra — Episcopal miter shell
- Modiolus modiolus — northern horse mussel
- Modulus modulus
- Neocrassa neocrassa
- Ogasawarana ogasawarana
- Oliva oliva — olive shell
- Perna perna — brown mussel
- Persicula persicula — spotted marginella
- Planorbis planorbis
- Prunum prunum
- Quadriplicata quadriplicata
- Quadrula quadrula — mapleleaf mussel
- Rapa rapa — bubble turnip
- Spirula spirula — ram's horn squid
- Staphylaea staphylaea — stippled cowry
- Sultana sultana
- Telescopium telescopium — telescope snail
- Terebellum terebellum — terebellum conch
- Tergipes tergipes
- Tricornis tricornis — three-cornered conch
- Umbraculum umbraculum — umbrella slug
- Velutina velutina — velvet shell
- Villosa villosa — a freshwater mussel
- Viviparus viviparus — a European freshwater snail
- Volva volva — shuttlecock volva
- Vulsella vulsella
- Zonaria zonaria

== Other ==
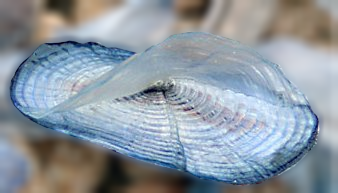
Velella velella

- Aaptos aaptos — a sponge
- Acanthogyrus acanthogyrus — an acanthocephalan worm
- Cephea cephea — crown jellyfish, cauliflower jellyfish
- Chaos chaos — an amoeba
- Cidaris cidaris — long-spine slate pen sea urchin
- Convoluta convoluta — a flatworm
- Crambe crambe — oyster sponge
- Crassicauda crassicauda — a nematode
- Echiurus echiurus — a spoon worm
- Gracilisentis gracilisentis — a thorny-headed worm
- Hamigera hamigera — a sponge
- Heterophyes heterophyes — an intestinal fluke
- Loa loa — a nematode
- †Mediocris mediocris — a Carboniferous foraminiferan
- Moniliformis moniliformis — an acanthocephalan worm
- Ophiura ophiura – serpent star (a brittle star)
- Periphylla periphylla — helmet jellyfish
- Porites porites — hump coral, finger coral
- Porpita porpita — blue button (a siphonophore)
- Spirorbis spirorbis — an annelid
- Thalassema thalassema — a spoon worm
- Tubifex tubifex — sludge worm
- Turgida turgida — a nematode
- Velella velella — by-the-wind-sailor
- †Yukonensis yukonensis — a Cambrian archaeocyathan

== Plant near-tautonyms ==
- Abutilon abutiloides — shrubby Indian mallow
- Araucaria araucana — monkey puzzle tree
- Arctostaphylos uva-ursi — kinnikinnick (This is a tautonym because Arctostaphylos means "bear grape" in Greek and uva-ursi means "bear grape" in Latin.)
- Bistorta bistortoides – western bistort
- Bituminaria bituminosa — Arabian pea
- Cajanus cajan — pigeon pea
- Canarina canariensis — Canary Island bellflower
- Cuminum cyminum — cumin
- Elymus elymoides — squirreltail
- Elymus hystrix var. hystrix (formerly Hystrix hystrix) — eastern bottlebrush grass
- Eriosyce eriosyzoides
- Hypericum hypericoides — St. Andrew's cross
- Inga ingoides — ice cream bean
- Larix laricina — tamarack
- Luzula luzuloides — white wood-rush
- Madia madioides — woodland madia
- Mantisalca salmantica
- Medinilla medinilliana
- Mielichhoferia mielichhoferiana — Mielichhof's copper moss
- Mycoporum mycoporoides
- Mycranthemum mycranthemoides — Nuttall's mudflower
- Phleum phleoides — Boehmer's cat's-tail
- Pinus pinea — stone pine
- Pyrus pyrifolia — Asian pear
- Raphanus raphanistrum — wild radish
- Sagittaria sagittifolia — arrowhead
- Salacca zalacca — salak
- Selaginella selaginoides — common spikemoss
- Silaum silaus — pepper saxifrage
- Soleirolia soleirolii — mother of thousands
- Spartina spartinae — gulf cordgrass
- Spiranthes spiralis — autumn lady's-tresses
- Tetragonia tetragonioides — New Zealand spinach
- Thalictrum thalictroides — rue-anemone
- Uncinia uncinata — Hawai'i bird-catching sedge
- Weberbauerocereus weberbaueri
- Zinnia zinnioides — zinnia-like zinnia
- Ziziphus zizyphus — jujube (note that the currently accepted name is Ziziphus jujuba)

== Fungal near-tautonyms ==
- Alternaria alternata
- Aspergillus asper
- Bovista bovistoides
- Flagelloscypha flagellata
- Hydropus hydrophoroides
- Laccaria laccata — lackluster laccaria
- Melanoleuca melaleuca
- Roridomyces roridus — dripping bonnet
- Sclerotinia sclerotiorum — plant pathogen causing white mold
- Scutellinia scutellata — eyelash pixie cup
- Volvariella volvacea — straw mushroom

== See also ==
- List of triple tautonyms
- Bilingual tautological expressions
