= List of triple tautonyms =

The following is a list of triple tautonyms: zoological names of species consisting of three identical words (the generic name, the specific name and the subspecific name have the same spelling). Such names are allowed in zoology, but not in botany, where the generic and specific epithets of a species must differ (though differences as small as one letter are permitted, as in cumin, Cuminum cyminum).

== List ==
=== Mammals ===
- Alces alces alces, the European elk
- Bison bison bison, the plains bison
- Capreolus capreolus capreolus, the European roe deer
- Caracal caracal caracal, a subspecies of caracal
- Chinchilla chinchilla chinchilla, subspecies of short-tailed chinchilla
- Cricetus cricetus cricetus, a subspecies of European hamster
- Dama dama dama, subspecies of the European fallow deer
- Gazella gazella gazella, subspecies of mountain gazelle
- Genetta genetta genetta, a subspecies of common genet
- Giraffa giraffa giraffa, the South African giraffe (Note: Proposed classification)
- Gorilla gorilla gorilla, the western lowland gorilla
- Gulo gulo gulo, subspecies of wolverine
- Hoolock hoolock hoolock, subspecies of western hoolock gibbon
- Indri indri indri, subspecies of indri
- Lutra lutra lutra, the European and North African variant of the Eurasian otter
- Lynx lynx lynx, the Northern European lynx
- Marmota marmota marmota, the alpine marmot
- Martes martes martes, subspecies of the European pine marten
- Meles meles meles, the European badger
- Mephitis mephitis mephitis, the Canada striped skunk
- Molossus molossus molossus, subspecies of velvety free-tailed bat
- Myotis myotis myotis, subspecies of greater mouse-eared bat
- Nasua nasua nasua, subspecies of South American coati
- Oreotragus oreotragus oreotragus, subspecies of klipspringer
- Petaurista petaurista petaurista, subspecies of red giant flying squirrel
- Phocoena phocoena phocoena, subspecies of harbour porpoise
- Pipistrellus pipistrellus pipistrellus, subspecies of common pipistrelle
- Pithecia pithecia pithecia, subspecies of white-faced saki
- Rattus rattus rattus, the roof rat
- Redunca redunca redunca, the bohor reedbuck
- Rupicapra rupicapra rupicapra, the Alpine chamois
- Saccolaimus saccolaimus saccolaimus, subspecies of naked-rumped pouched bat
- Urva urva urva, subspecies of crab-eating mongoose
- Vicugna vicugna vicugna, subspecies of vicuña
- Vulpes vulpes vulpes, the Scandinavian red fox

=== Reptiles and amphibians ===
- Ameiva ameiva ameiva, a subspecies of the giant ameiva (South American ground lizard)
- Bufo bufo bufo, the European toad
- Caretta caretta caretta, the Atlantic loggerhead sea turtle
- Cerastes cerastes cerastes, a subspecies of Saharan horned viper
- Chitra chitra chitra, Siamese narrow-headed softshell turtle
- Clelia clelia clelia, subspecies of mussurana snake
- Iguana iguana iguana, a subspecies of the green iguana
- Naja naja naja, the Indian cobra
- Natrix natrix natrix, the Central European variant of the grass snake
- Salamandra salamandra salamandra, a subspecies of the fire salamander
- Scincus scincus scincus, subspecies of sandfish skink

=== Birds ===
- Alario alario alario, subspecies of black-headed canary
- Alle alle alle, a subspecies of little auk
- Amandava amandava amandava, subspecies of red avadavat
- Amazilia amazilia amazilia, subspecies of amazilia hummingbird
- Anhinga anhinga anhinga, a subspecies of anhinga
- Anser anser anser, a subspecies of greylag goose
- Antigone antigone antigone, subspecies of sarus crane
- Apus apus apus, subspecies of common swift
- Bubo bubo bubo, the European eagle-owl
- Buteo buteo buteo, the European buzzard
- Calliope calliope calliope, subspecies of the Siberian rubythroat
- Carduelis carduelis carduelis, subspecies of the European goldfinch
- Cardinalis cardinalis cardinalis, a subspecies of northern cardinal
- Casuarius casuarius casuarius, subspecies of southern cassowary
- Chloris chloris chloris, subspecies of European greenfinch
- Ciconia ciconia ciconia, a subspecies of white stork
- Cinclus cinclus cinclus, subspecies of white-throated dipper
- Coccothraustes coccothraustes coccothraustes, subspecies of hawfinch
- Cochlearius cochlearius cochlearius, subspecies of boat-billed heron
- Coeligena coeligena coeligena, subspecies of bronzy inca
- Colius colius colius, subspecies of white-backed mousebird
- Coturnix coturnix coturnix, subspecies of common quail
- Crossoptilon crossoptilon crossoptilon, the Szechuan white-eared pheasant
- Curaeus curaeus curaeus, subspecies of austral blackbird
- Curruca curruca curruca, subspecies of lesser whitethroat
- Dives dives dives, subspecies of melodious blackbird
- Diuca diuca diuca, a subspecies of diuca finch
- Erythrogenys erythrogenys erythrogenys, subspecies of rusty-cheeked scimitar babbler
- Francolinus francolinus francolinus, a subspecies of black francolin
- Gallinago gallinago gallinago, subspecies of common snipe
- Gallus gallus gallus, the Cochin-Chinese red junglefowl
- Grus grus grus, subspecies of common crane
- Icterus icterus icterus, subspecies of Venezuelan troupial
- Limosa limosa limosa, subspecies of black-tailed godwit
- Jacana jacana jacana, the wattled jacana
- Lagopus lagopus lagopus, the willow ptarmigan
- Manacus manacus manacus, subspecies of white-bearded manakin
- Melanodera melanodera melanodera, subspecies of white-bridled finch
- Milvus milvus milvus, a subspecies of red kite
- Nycticorax nycticorax nycticorax, subspecies of black-crowned night heron
- Oenanthe oenanthe oenanthe, subspecies of northern wheatear
- Oriolus oriolus oriolus, subspecies of Eurasian golden oriole
- Pauxi pauxi pauxi, subspecies of helmeted curassow
- Perdix perdix perdix, subspecies of grey partridge
- Petronia petronia petronia, subspecies of rock sparrow
- Phoenicurus phoenicurus phoenicurus, subspecies of common redstart
- Pica pica pica, a subspecies of Eurasian magpie
- Porphyrio porphyrio porphyrio, subspecies of western swamphen
- Puffinus puffinus puffinus, subspecies of Manx shearwater
- Pyrope pyrope pyrope, subspecies of fire-eyed diucon
- Pyrrhocorax pyrrhocorax pyrrhocorax, subspecies of red-billed chough
- Pyrrhula pyrrhula pyrrhula, subspecies of Eurasian bullfinch
- Quelea quelea quelea, a subspecies of red-billed quelea
- Radjah radjah radjah, a subspecies of radjah shelduck
- Regulus regulus regulus, subspecies of goldcrest
- Riparia riparia riparia, a subspecies of sand martin
- Schoeniclus schoeniclus schoeniclus, subspecies of common reed bunting
- Suiriri suiriri suiriri, a subspecies of suiriri flycatcher
- Sula sula sula, the Caribbean and southwest Atlantic Islands variant of the red-footed booby
- Tchagra tchagra tchagra, subspecies of southern tchagra

=== Fish ===
- Alburnus alburnus alburnus, subspecies of common bleak
- Alosa alosa alosa, subspecies of allis shad
- Aspius aspius aspius, subspecies of asp fish
- Belone belone belone, subspecies of garfish
- Capoeta capoeta capoeta, subspecies of the Capoeta capoeta fish
- Carassius carassius carassius, subspecies of crucian carp
- Catostomus catostomus catostomus, subspecies of longnose sucker
- Gobio gobio gobio, subspecies of gudgeon
- Lepadogaster lepadogaster lepadogaster, subspecies of shore clingfish
- Liparis liparis liparis, subspecies of the common seasnail fish
- Lota lota lota, subspecies of burbot
- Merluccius merluccius merluccius, subspecies of European hake
- Pagrus pagrus pagrus, subspecies of red porgy
- Pangasius pangasius pangasius, subspecies of pangas catfish
- Phoxinus phoxinus phoxinus, subspecies of Eurasian minnow
- Pungitius pungitius pungitius, subspecies of ninespine stickleback
- Rutilus rutilus rutilus, subspecies of common roach
- Sprattus sprattus sprattus, subspecies of European sprat
- Vimba vimba vimba, subspecies of vimba bream

=== Insects ===
- Aspitha aspitha aspitha, subspecies of Aspitha butterfly
- Cephise cephise cephise, subspecies of Cephise skipper butterfly
- Chaetosiphon chaetosiphon chaetosiphon, subspecies of Chaetosiphon aphid
- Cossus cossus cossus, subspecies of goat moth
- Danis danis danis, subspecies of large green-banded blue butterfly
- Decinea decinea decinea, subspecies of Decinea decinea butterfly
- Duroca duroca duroca, subspecies of Duroca genus Hesperiini butterfly
- Ebusus ebusus ebusus, subspecies of Ebusus ebusus skipper butterfly
- Furcula furcula furcula, subspecies of sallow kitten
- Menander menander menander, subspecies of the Menander genus of metalmark butterflies
- Nyctelius nyctelius nyctelius, subspecies of violet-banded skipper
- Orthos orthos orthos, subspecies of Orthos butterfly
- Passova passova passova, subspecies of Passova butterfly
- Perpheres perpheres perpheres, subspecies of Perpheres butterfly
- Saturnus saturnus saturnus, subspecies of skipper butterfly
- Zera zera zera, subspecies of Zera butterfly
- Zonia zonia zonia, subspecies of Zonia genus butterfly

=== Mollusks ===
- Achatina achatina achatina, subspecies of giant African land snail
- Beckianum beckianum beckianum, subspecies of Beckianum beckianum snail
- Faustina faustina faustina, subspecies of Faustina faustina snail
- Gibberulus gibberulus gibberulus, subspecies of humpbacked conch
- Glycymeris glycymeris glycymeris, subspecies of dog cockle
- Haustellum haustellum haustellum, subspecies of Haustellum haustellum sea snail
- Macedonica macedonica macedonica, subspecies of Macedonica snail
- Melo melo melo, subspecies of Indian volute snail
- Oliva oliva oliva, subspecies of Oliva oliva sea snail
- Quadrula quadrula quadrula, subspecies of Quadrula quadrula freshwater mussel
- Sadleriana sadleriana sadleriana, subspecies of Sadleriana freshwater snail
- Viviparus viviparus viviparus, subspecies of Viviparus viviparus freshwater snail
- Volva volva volva, subspecies of Volva volva snail
- Zonaria zonaria zonaria, subspecies of Zonaria zonaria cowrie

=== Arthropods ===
- Astacus astacus astacus, subspecies of European crayfish
- Avicularia avicularia avicularia, subspecies of pinktoe tarantula
- Perforatus perforatus perforatus, subspecies of Perforatus perforatus barnacle

=== Annelid worms ===
- Echiurus echiurus echiurus, subspecies of Echiurus echiurus spoon worm
- Tubifex tubifex tubifex, subspecies of sludge worm

=== Echinoderms ===
- Cidaris cidaris cidaris, subspecies of long-spine slate pen sea urchin

== See also ==
- List of tautonyms
