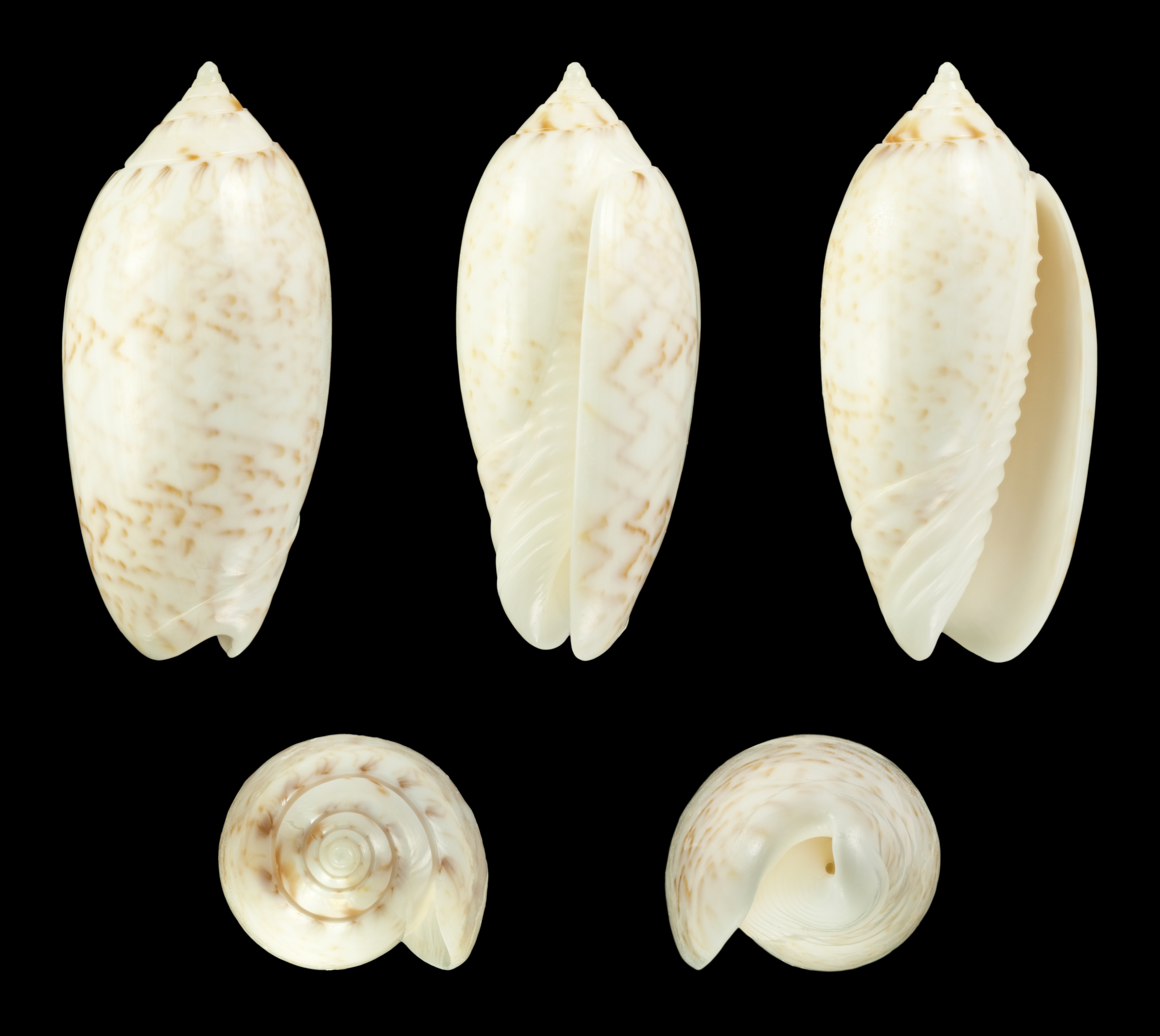

Scientific classification
- Kingdom: Animalia
- Phylum: Mollusca
- Class: Gastropoda
- Subclass: Caenogastropoda
- Order: Neogastropoda
- Family: Olividae
- Genus: Oliva
- Species: O. reticularis

Binomial name
- Oliva reticularis Lamarck, 1811

Synonyms
- Americoliva reticularis (Lamarck, 1811); Oliva (Americoliva) reticularis Lamarck, 1811· accepted, alternate representation; Oliva alba Mörch, 1878; Oliva antillensis Petuch & Sargent, 1986; Oliva castanea Mörch, 1878; Oliva ernesti Petuch, 1990; Oliva fasciata Mörch, 1878; Oliva finlayi Petuch & Sargent, 1986; Oliva formosa Marrat, 1870; Oliva olivacea Marrat, 1870; Oliva pallida Marrat, 1867; Oliva reticularis ernesti Petuch, 1990; Oliva sowerbyi Marrat, 1870; Oliva unicolor Mörch, 1878; Oliva vermiculata Gray, 1858; Oliva (Oliva) vermiculata Gray, J.E., 1858; Oliva (Strephona) antillensis Petuch, E.J. & D.M. Sargent, 1986; Oliva (Strephona) bahamasensis Petuch, E.J. & D.M. Sargent, 1986; Oliva (Strephona) finlayi Petuch, E.J. & D.M. Sargent, 1986; Oliva (Strephona) reticularis Lamarck, J.B.P.A. de, 1811

= Oliva reticularis =

Species of gastropod

Oliva reticularis, common name the netted olive, is a species of sea snail, a marine gastropod mollusk in the family Olividae, Olivinae (Subfamily), the olives.

Subspecies

- Oliva reticularis lilacea (Paulmier, 2013)
- Oliva reticularis reticularis Lamarck, 1811
- Oliva reticularis greenwayae Clench, 1937 (taxon inquirendum)
- Oliva reticularis ernesti Petuch, 1990: synonym of Oliva reticularis Lamarck, 1811
- Oliva reticularis olorinella Duclos, 1835: synonym of Oliva oliva (Linnaeus, 1758)

== Description ==
The length of the shell varies between 25 mm and 46 mm. The species was originally described by Lamarck in 1811 in Annales du Muséum National d'Histoire Naturelle, volume 16, pages 300–328, at page 314 (species 16).

== Distribution ==
This species occurs in the Caribbean Sea, the Gulf of Mexico and in the Atlantic Ocean off the Bermudas and northern Brazil.
