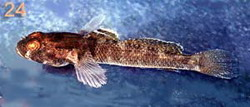
- Z. zebrus

Scientific classification
- Kingdom: Animalia
- Phylum: Chordata
- Class: Actinopterygii
- Division: Teleostei
- Order: Gobiiformes
- Family: Gobiidae
- Genus: Zebrus de Buen, 1930

Type species
- Gobius (Zebrus) zebrus (Risso, 1827)

= Zebrus =

Genus of fishes

Zebrus is a genus of gobies native to the eastern Atlantic Ocean and the Mediterranean Sea.

== Species ==
There are currently two recognized species in this genus:

- Zebrus pallaoroi Kovačić, Šanda & Vukić, 2021 (Pallaoro's goby)
- Zebrus zebrus (Risso, 1827) (Zebra goby)
