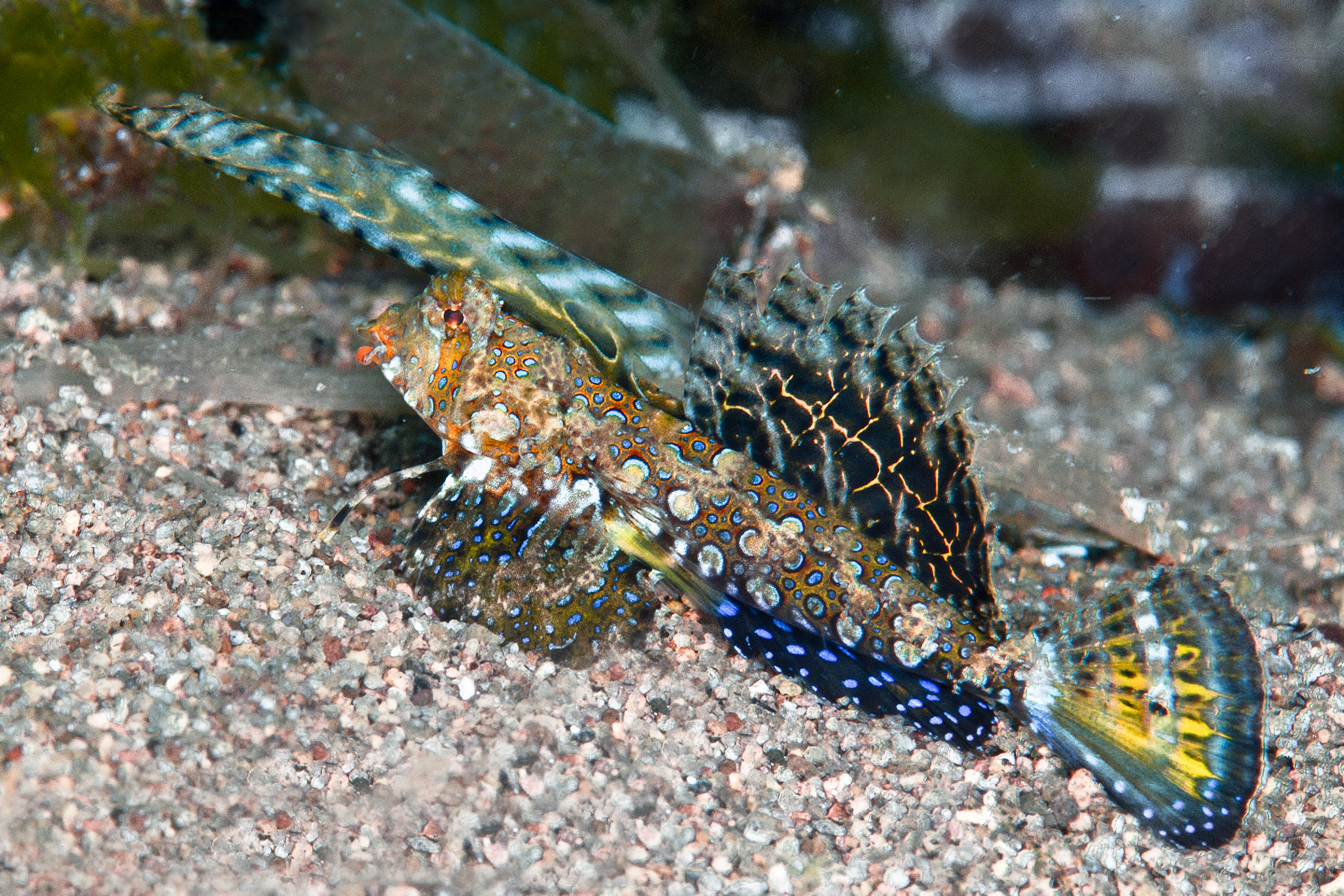

Scientific classification
- Kingdom: Animalia
- Phylum: Chordata
- Class: Actinopterygii
- Order: Syngnathiformes
- Family: Callionymidae
- Genus: Dactylopus
- Species: D. kuiteri

Binomial name
- Dactylopus kuiteri (R. Fricke, 1992)

= Dactylopus kuiteri =

Species of fish

Dactylopus kuiteri, known commonly as the Kuiter's dragonet, is a species of marine fish in the family Callionymidae.

The Kuiter's dragonet is widespread throughout the tropical waters of the central Indo-Pacific region and particularly around Indonesia.

This species reaches a length of 15 centimetres (5.9 in) TL.

The specific name honours the collector and author of the Pictorial guide to Indonesian reef fishes, Rudie H. Kuiter.
