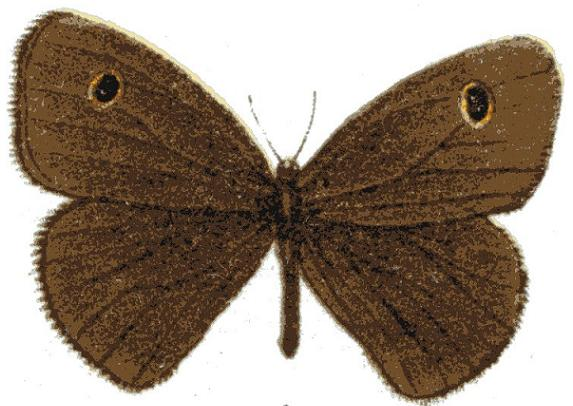
- Mashuna mashuna

Scientific classification
- Kingdom: Animalia
- Phylum: Arthropoda
- Class: Insecta
- Order: Lepidoptera
- Family: Nymphalidae
- Tribe: Satyrini
- Genus: Mashuna van Son, 1955

Type species
- Ypthima mashuna Trimen, 1895

Diversity
- Two species

Synonyms
- Ypthimorpha Overlaet, 1955

= Mashuna =

Genus of butterflies

Mashuna is a butterfly genus from the subfamily Satyrinae in the family Nymphalidae.

== Species ==
- Mashuna mashuna (Trimen, 1895)
- Mashuna upemba (Overlaet, 1955)
