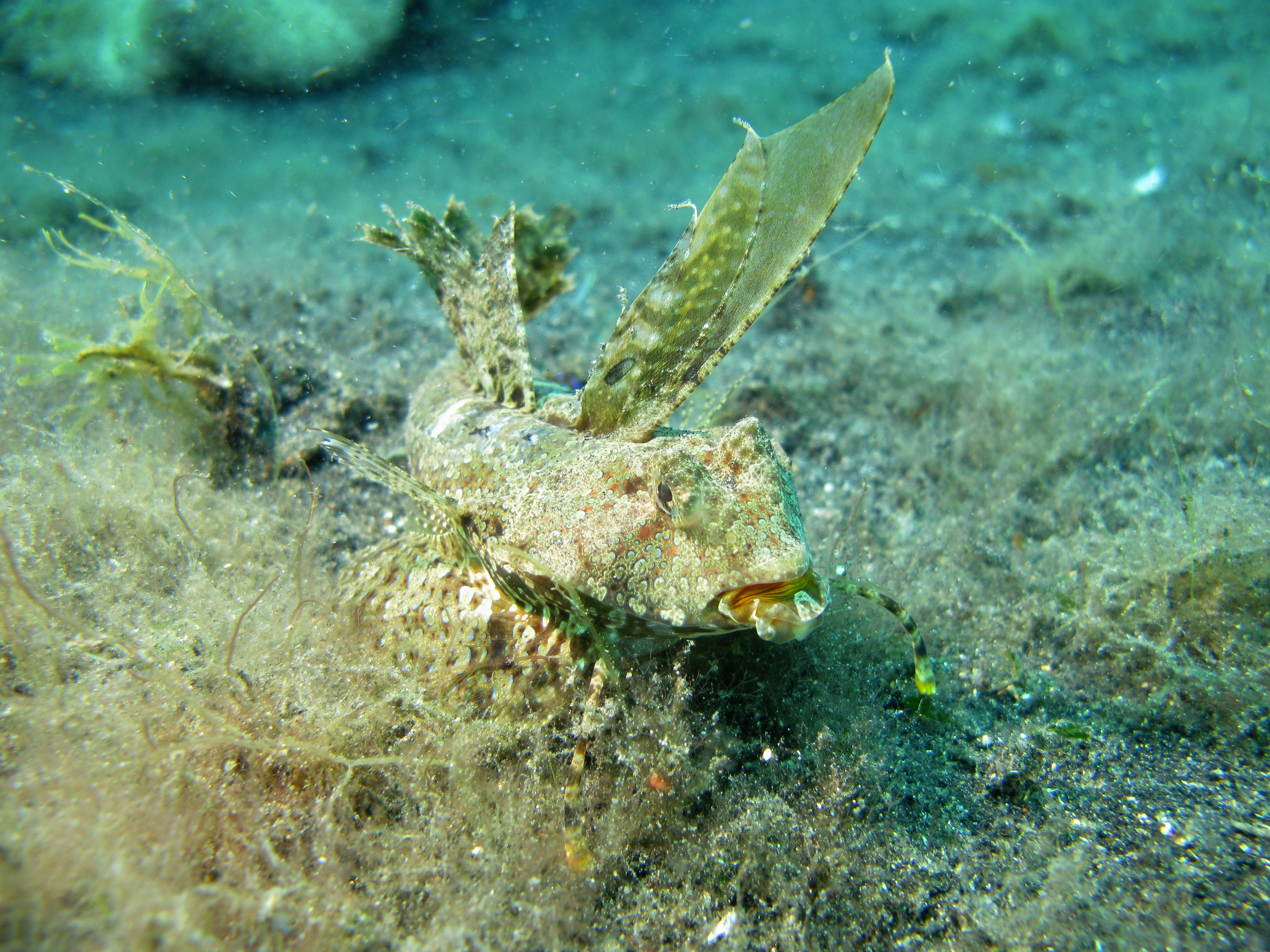
- Fingered Dragonet (D. dactylopus)

Scientific classification
- Kingdom: Animalia
- Phylum: Chordata
- Class: Actinopterygii
- Order: Syngnathiformes
- Family: Callionymidae
- Genus: Dactylopus; T. N. Gill, 1859

Type species
- Callionymus dactylopus Valenciennes 1837

= Dactylopus =

Genus of fishes

Dactylopus is a genus of dragonets native to the western Pacific Ocean.

== Species ==
There are currently two recognized species in this genus:

- Dactylopus dactylopus (Valenciennes, 1837) (Fingered dragonet)
- Dactylopus kuiteri (R. Fricke, 1992) (Orange-black dragonet)
