= Mashuna upemba =

Scientific classification
- Domain: Eukaryota
- Kingdom: Animalia
- Phylum: Arthropoda
- Class: Insecta
- Order: Lepidoptera
- Family: Nymphalidae
- Genus: Mashuna
- Species: M. upemba

Binomial name
- Mashuna upemba (Overlaet, 1955)

Synonyms
- Ypthimorpha upemba Overlaet, 1955

Species of butterfly

Mashuna upemba is a butterfly in the family Nymphalidae. It is found in north-eastern Angola, the Democratic Republic of the Congo and south-western Tanzania. The habitat consists of marshy areas and open, grassy glades at high altitudes.
