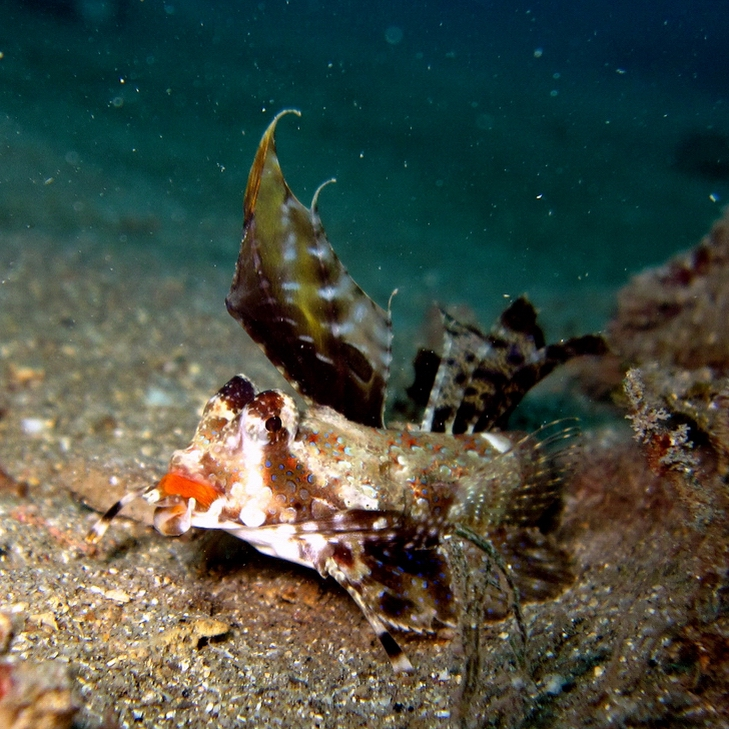

Scientific classification
- Kingdom: Animalia
- Phylum: Chordata
- Class: Actinopterygii
- Order: Syngnathiformes
- Family: Callionymidae
- Genus: Dactylopus
- Species: D. dactylopus

Binomial name
- Dactylopus dactylopus (Valenciennes, 1837)

Synonyms
- Callionymus dactylopus Valenciennes, 1837

= Fingered dragonet =

Species of fish

Dactylopus dactylopus, known commonly as the fingered dragonet, is a species of marine fish in the family Callionymidae.

The fingered dragonet is widespread throughout the tropical waters of the central Indo-Pacific region from Indonesia to Palau Islands.

It is found at depths of from 1 to 55 metres (3.3 to 180.4 ft) and prefers sandy or muddy substrates, often with weed growth.

This species reaches a length of 30 centimetres (12 in) TL.

This species can be found in the aquarium trade.
