= Tautonym =

Species having the same Genus and species name

A tautonym is a scientific name of a species in which both parts of the name have the same spelling, such as Rattus rattus. The first part of the name is the name of the genus and the second part is referred to as the specific epithet in the International Code of Nomenclature for algae, fungi, and plants and the specific name in the International Code of Zoological Nomenclature.

Tautonymy (i.e., the usage of tautonymous names) is permissible in zoological nomenclature (see List of tautonyms for examples). In past editions of the zoological code, the term tautonym was used, but it has now been replaced by the more inclusive "tautonymous names"; these include trinomial names for subspecies such as Gorilla gorilla gorilla and Bison bison bison.

Tautonyms can be formed when animals are given scientific names for the first time, or when they are reclassified and given new scientific names. An example of the former is the hidden mirror skipper of Brazil with the scientific name Speculum speculum, which comes from a Latin word for "mirror" in reference to the shiny, mirror-like coloring on its wings. An example of the latter is Nombe nombe, an extinct kangaroo from the late Pleistocene epoch found in Papua New Guinea's Nombe Rockshelter that was classified as Protemnodon nombe until 2022 when it was reclassified in light of a more recent review of the animal's dental attributes. Animals with tautonymous names can also be reclassified so that they no longer have tautonymous names, as was the case with Polyspila polyspila (now Calligrapha polyspila).

For animals, a tautonym implicitly (though not always) indicates that the species is the type species of its genus. This can also be indicated by a species name with the specific epithet typus or typicus, although more commonly the type species is designated another way.

Regarding other living organisms, tautonyms were prohibited in bacteriological nomenclature from 1947 until 1975, but they are now permitted for all bacteria and prokaryotes. Tautonyms are prohibited by the codes of nomenclature for botany and for cultivated plants, but they are not prohibited by the code of nomenclature for viruses.

== Botanical nomenclature ==
In the current rules for botanical nomenclature (which apply retroactively), tautonyms are explicitly prohibited. The reason for prohibiting tautonyms is not explained in current or historical botanical nomenclatural codes, but it appears to have resulted from concerns over a century ago that identical taxon names could result in confusion where those names share identical spelling and identical capitalization.

One example of a former botanical tautonym is 'Larix larix'. The earliest name for the European larch is Pinus larix L. (1753) but Gustav Karl Wilhelm Hermann Karsten did not agree with the placement of the species in Pinus and decided to move it to Larix in 1880. His proposed name created a tautonym. Under rules first established in 1906, which are applied retroactively, Larix larix cannot exist as a formal name. In such a case either the next earliest validly published name must be found, in this case Larix decidua Mill. (1768), or (in its absence) a new epithet must be published.

However, it is allowed for both parts of the name of a species to mean the same (pleonasm), without being identical in spelling. For instance, Arctostaphylos uva-ursi means bearberry twice, in Greek and Latin respectively; Picea omorika uses the Latin and Serbian terms for a spruce.

Instances that repeat the genus name with a slight modification, such as Lycopersicon lycopersicum (Greek and Latinized Greek, a rejected name for the tomato) and Ziziphus zizyphus, have been contentious, but are in accord with the Code of Nomenclature.

In April 2023, a proposal was made to permit tautonyms in botanical nomenclature on a non-retroactive basis, noting that tautonyms have been allowed in zoological and bacteriological codes for decades without incident, and that allowing tautonyms would simplify botany's nomenclatural code while eliminating certain naming problems and preserving the epithets originally assigned to species.

== See also ==
- List of tautonyms
- Binomial nomenclature
- Reduplication
- List of tautological place names
