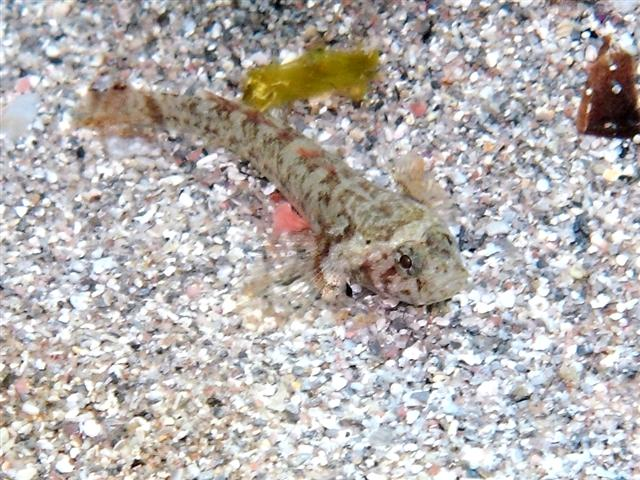

Conservation status
- Least Concern (IUCN 3.1)

Scientific classification
- Kingdom: Animalia
- Phylum: Chordata
- Class: Actinopterygii
- Division: Teleostei
- Order: Gobiiformes
- Family: Gobiidae
- Genus: Zebrus; F. de Buen, 1930
- Species: Z. zebrus

Binomial name
- Zebrus zebrus (A. Risso, 1827)

Synonyms
- Gobius zebrus A. Risso, 1827

= Zebra goby =

Species of fish

The zebra goby (Zebrus zebrus) is a species of goby native to the Mediterranean Sea, where it occurs in lagoons and tide pools at depths down to 3 m (10 ft). It prefers areas of concealment, such as within patches of seagrass or algae or underneath stones. This species grows to a total length of 5.5 cm (2.2 in).
