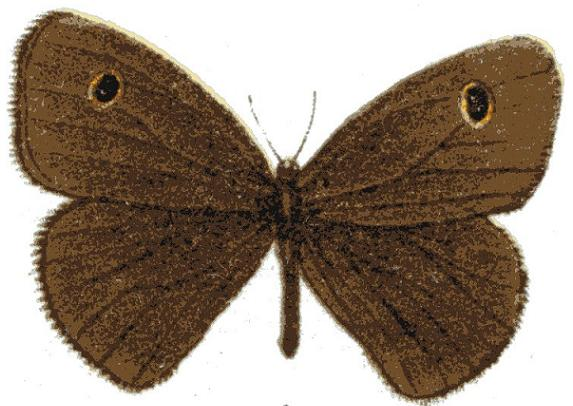

Scientific classification
- Kingdom: Animalia
- Phylum: Arthropoda
- Class: Insecta
- Order: Lepidoptera
- Family: Nymphalidae
- Genus: Mashuna
- Species: M. mashuna

Binomial name
- Mashuna mashuna (Trimen, 1895)

Synonyms
- Ypthima mashuna Trimen, 1895

= Mashuna mashuna =

Species of butterfly

Mashuna mashuna, the Mashuna ringlet, is a butterfly in the family Nymphalidae. It is found in Zimbabwe. The habitat consists of marshy areas in savanna and grassland.

The larvae feed on Cynodon species.
