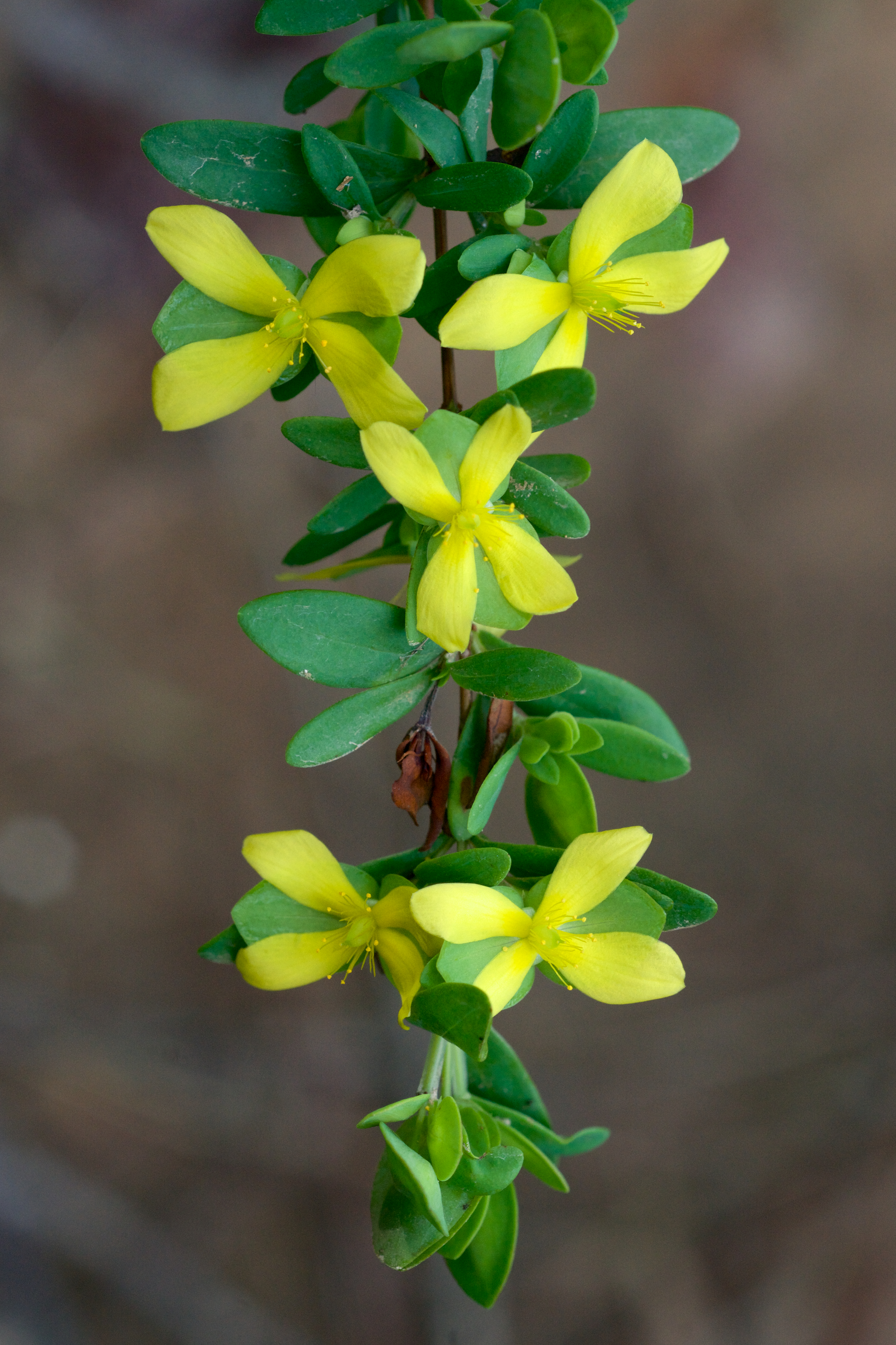

Conservation status
- Least Concern (IUCN 3.1)

Scientific classification
- Kingdom: Plantae
- Clade: Tracheophytes
- Clade: Angiosperms
- Clade: Eudicots
- Clade: Rosids
- Order: Malpighiales
- Family: Hypericaceae
- Genus: Hypericum
- Subsection: H. subsect. Ascyrum
- Species: H. hypericoides

Binomial name
- Hypericum hypericoides (L.) Crantz

Synonyms
- Ascyrum hypericoides L.; Hypericoides perforata Poir.

= Hypericum hypericoides =

Species of flowering plant in the St John's wort family

Hypericum hypericoides, commonly called St. Andrew's cross, is a species of flowering plant in the St. John's wort family, Hypericaceae. It is native to the Southeastern United States, Mexico, Central America, and the Caribbean. Its preferred habitat is dry woods on acidic soil.

It is a small shrub or shrublet that produces yellow flowers with four petals. Individuals are between 3 and 10 decimeters (approximately 1 to 3.3 feet) in height. Leaves range in shape between linear, elliptic, and oblanceolate in shape, and reach a length between 8 and 26 millimeters long.

There are, according to some classifications, 2 subspecies, hypericoides and multicaule. However, the latter of these is usually classified as a separate species, Hypericum stragulum.
