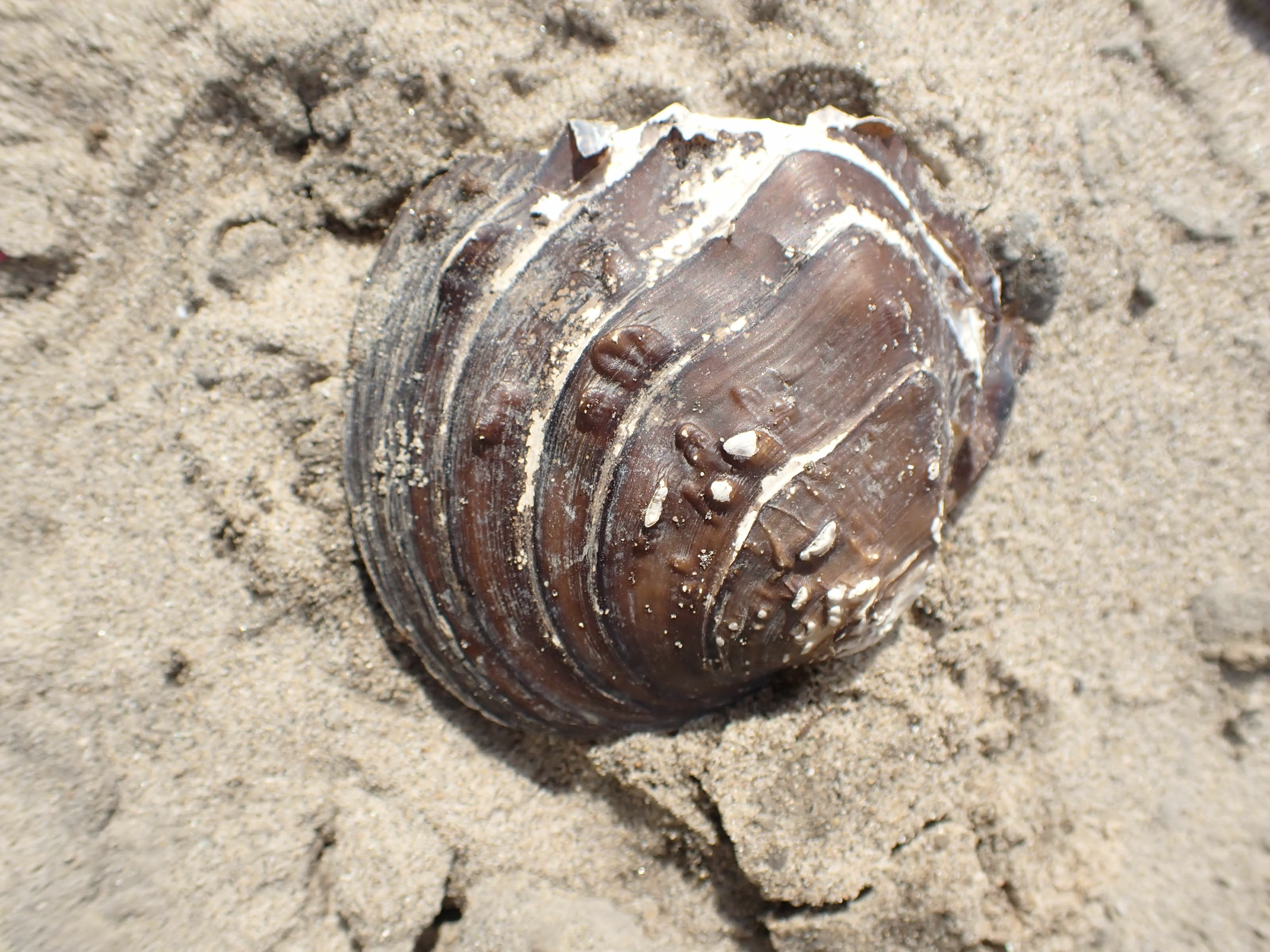
- Exterior of empty shell of Quadrula quadrula, Selkirk, Manitoba

Conservation status
- Least Concern (IUCN 3.1)

- Secure (NatureServe)

Scientific classification
- Kingdom: Animalia
- Phylum: Mollusca
- Class: Bivalvia
- Order: Unionida
- Family: Unionidae
- Genus: Quadrula
- Species: Q. quadrula

Binomial name
- Quadrula quadrula (Rafinesque, 1820)

= Quadrula quadrula =

Species of bivalve

Quadrula quadrula, the mapleleaf, is a species of freshwater mussel, an aquatic bivalve mollusk in the family Unionidae, the river mussels.

The thick shell is about as broad as it is long with heavy hinge teeth. The outside may be yellowish green to dark brown and the inside is white. Two rows of raised bumps extend in a v-shape from the umbo to the back edge in most individuals.

This species is native to North America.

In the United States, it is found in the Interior, Nelson and Great Lakes basins, as well as in the western Gulf Coastal Plain.

Two populations occur in Canada, one found in Manitoba in the Red River, the Assiniboine River, and Lake Winnipeg and the other in Ontario in rivers emptying into Lake Huron, Lake Erie, Lake St. Clair, and Lake Ontario. The population in Manitoba is designated 'Threatened' by the Committee on the Status of Endangered Wildlife in Canada. while the Ontario population is designated of 'Special Concern.'
