= Ebusus ebusus =

Scientific classification
- Kingdom: Animalia
- Phylum: Arthropoda
- Class: Insecta
- Order: Lepidoptera
- Family: Hesperiidae
- Subtribe: Carystina
- Genus: Ebusus; Evans, [1955]
- Species: E. ebusus

Binomial name
- Ebusus ebusus (Stoll, 1780)

Genus of butterflies

Ebusus ebusus is a species of skipper butterfly in the family Hesperiidae. It is the only species in the monotypic genus Ebusus.
