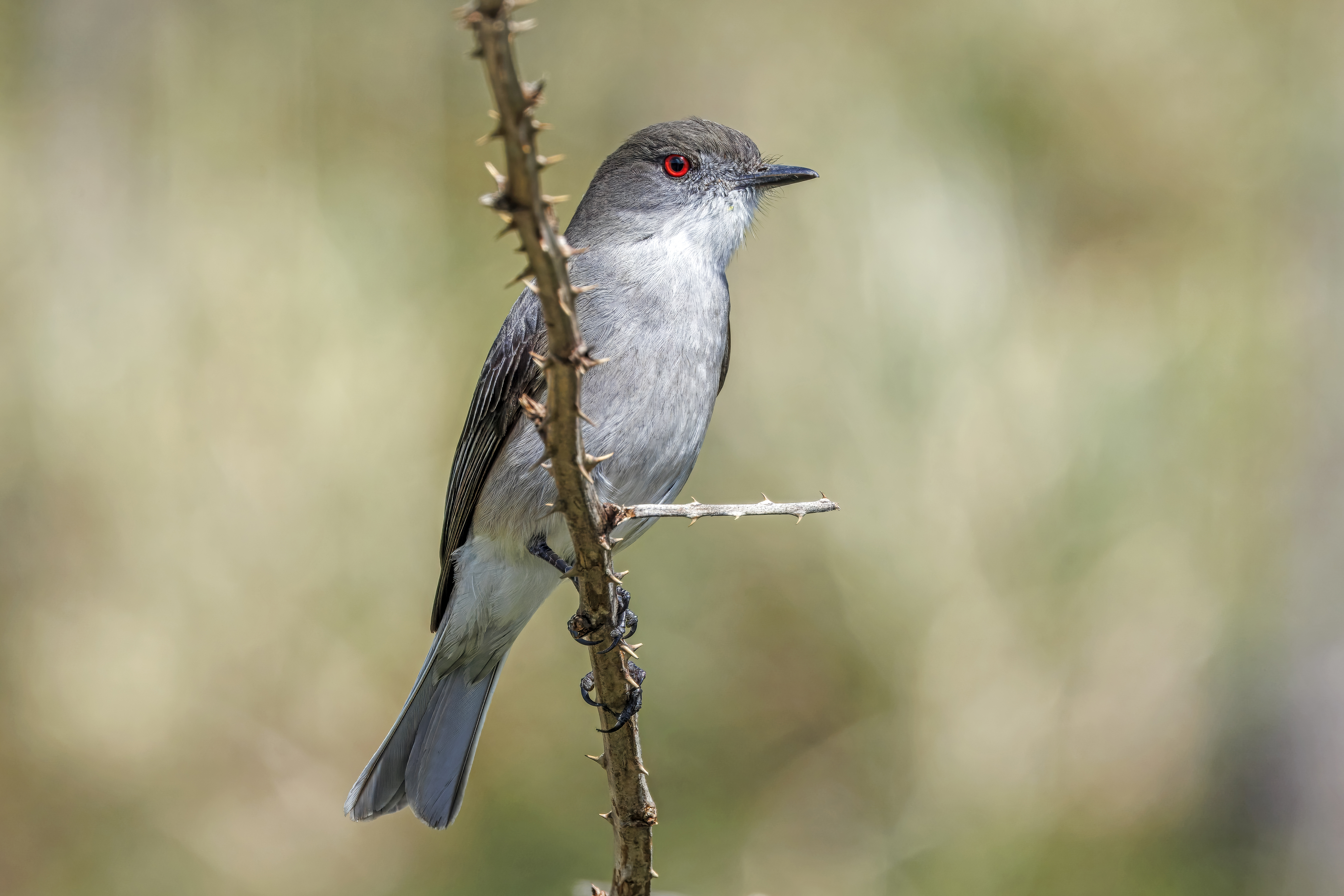

Conservation status
- Least Concern (IUCN 3.1)

Scientific classification
- Kingdom: Animalia
- Phylum: Chordata
- Class: Aves
- Order: Passeriformes
- Family: Tyrannidae
- Genus: Pyrope; Cabanis & Heine, 1860
- Species: P. pyrope

Binomial name
- Pyrope pyrope (Kittlitz, 1830)
- Breeding Non-Breeding

Synonyms
- See text

= Fire-eyed diucon =

Species of bird

The fire-eyed diucon (Pyrope pyrope) is a passerine bird of South America belonging to the tyrant flycatcher family Tyrannidae. It is found in Argentina and Chile and as a vagrant to the Falkland Islands.

== Taxonomy and systematics ==
The fire-eyed diucon has a complicated taxonomic history. It was formally described in 1830 as "Muscicapa Pyrope". In 1860 it was moved to the newly erected genus Pyrope and then in 1927 to genus Xolmis. In 1970 one author returned it to Pyrope while others retained it in Xolmis. Two genetic studies published in 2020 showed that it did belong to Pyrope. Taxonomic systems began making the change in 2021. However, as of December 2024 BirdLife International's Handbook of the Birds of the World retained the species in Xolmis.

The fire-eyed diucon is the only member of genus Pyrope. It has two subspecies, the nominate P. p. pyrope (Kittlitz, 1830) and P. p. fortis (Philippi Bañados & Johnson, AW, 1946).

== Description ==
The fire-eyed diucon is 18.5 to 21.5 cm (7.3 to 8.5 in) long and weighs 31 to 50 g (1.1 to 1.8 oz). The sexes have the same plumage. Adults of the nominate subspecies have a dark gray crown, face, and upperparts. Their primary coverts and remiges are black with pale gray edges on the inner remiges. Their tail is dark gray with paler outer feathers and paler tips on the others. Their throat is very pale ashy gray with faint darker gray streaks. Their breast is a darker ashy gray, their belly grayish white, and their vent area white. Subspecies P. p. fortis is larger than the nominate and has darker upper- and underparts. Adults of both sexes of both subspecies have a bright red iris that gives the species its English name, a black bill, and black or blackish legs and feet. Juveniles have a brown iris.

== Distribution and habitat ==
The nominate subspecies of the fire-eyed diucon is found from northern Chile's central Coquimbo Region and west-central Argentina's Neuquén Province south to Cape Horn. Subspecies P. p. fortis is found on Chile's Chiloé Island. The nominate subspecies has also been recorded as a vagrant on the Falkland Islands. In Chile and Argentina the species inhabits open landscapes including the edge of Nothofagus forest, open woodlands, agricultural lands and gardens, and the shrubby ecotone between forest and steppe. In elevation it mostly ranges up to at least 2,000 m (6,600 ft) and may be found as high as 3,050 m (10,000 ft).

== Behavior ==
=== Movement ===
The fire-eyed diucon's mainland population is completely migratory. It breeds in Argentina and in Chile from the Atacama Region south to Cape Horn and entirely vacates that range in the austral winter. It spends the winter in Chile from northern Atacama north to the central Coquimbo Region. The Chiloé Island subspecies P. p. fortis is thought by some authors to be a year-round resident and by others to migrate north like the mainland subspecies.

=== Feeding ===
The fire-eyed diucon's diet is not known in detail. It feeds primarily on insects and also in the austral winter includes fruits like wild berries and grapes. It forages mostly singly or in pairs, dropping from a perch to prey the ground or sallying from a perch to capture it in mid-air ("hawking").

=== Breeding ===
The fire-eyed diucon breeds starting in October in northern Chile and as late as December or January in the south. Males make a flight display in which they fly high with slow wing beats and without vocalizing. The species' nest is an open cup woven from sticks and grass lined with lichen, moss, or wool. It is placed in a shrub or tree up to about 5 m (15 ft) above the ground and often in streamside vegetation. The clutch ranges from two to four eggs with three being the most common size. The eggs are creamy white with red spots. Shiny cowbirds (Molothrus bonariensis) are known to parasitize the nest. The incubation period, time to fledging, and details of parental care are not known.

=== Vocalization ===
The fire-eyed diucon is not highly vocal. Its song is "short call notes terminating in a flourish...pt wheet whut T-T-wheeeooo". Its call has been described as "a quiet peet" and a "soft, subdued pit or whit", "a soft pt", and "a very brief and relatively high pitched tseet".

== Status ==
The IUCN has assessed the fire-eyed diucon as being of Least Concern. It has a very large range; its population size is not known and is believed to be stable. No immediate threats have been identified. It is considered fairly common, and its "wide distribution and abundance, including in urbanized areas, suggest that there are no current significant human threats".
