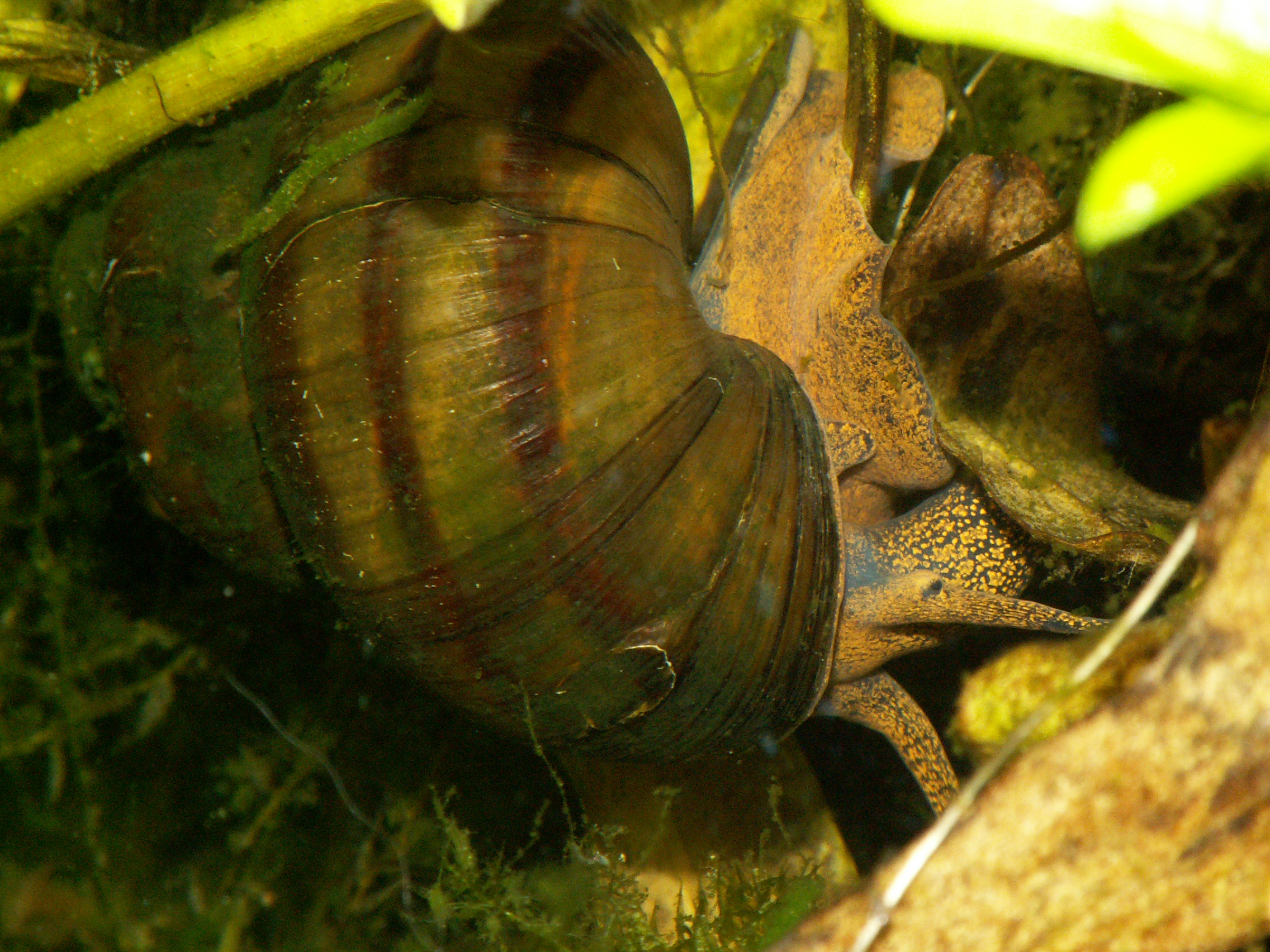
- A live individual of Viviparus viviparus
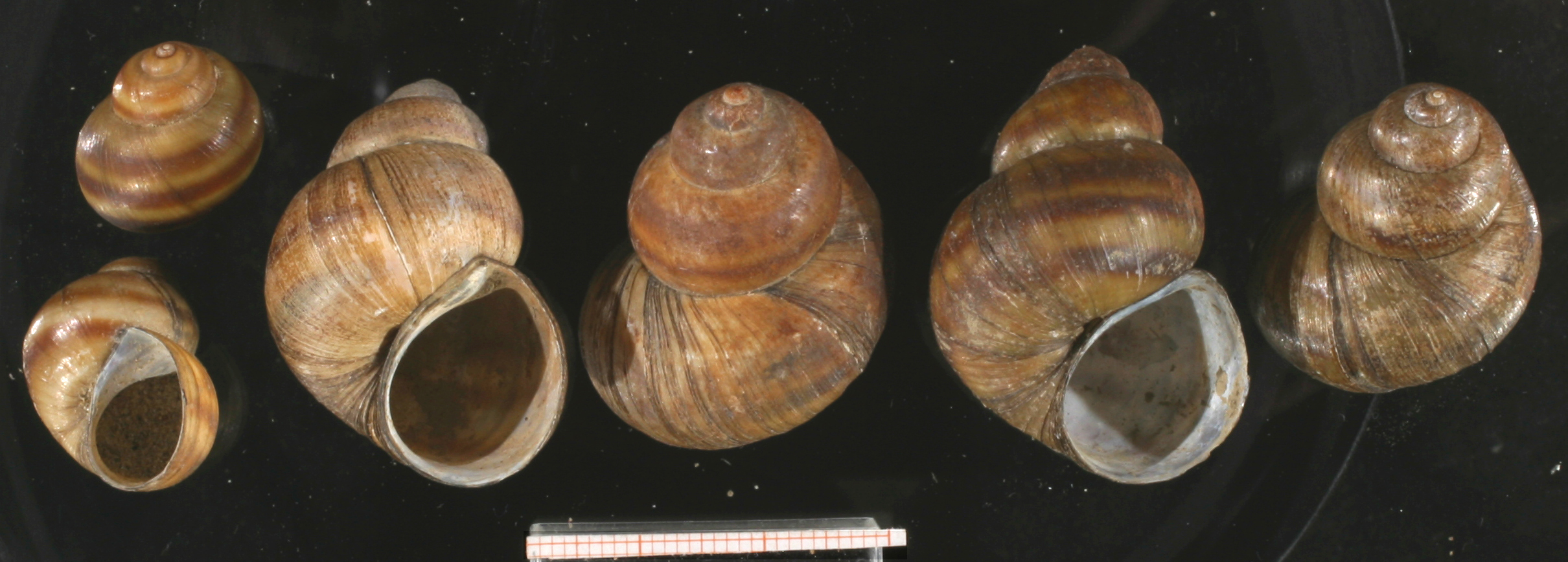
- Six shells of Viviparus viviparus, including two juveniles

Conservation status
- Least Concern (IUCN 3.1)

Scientific classification
- Kingdom: Animalia
- Phylum: Mollusca
- Class: Gastropoda
- Subclass: Caenogastropoda
- Order: Architaenioglossa
- Family: Viviparidae
- Genus: Viviparus
- Species: V. viviparus

Binomial name
- Viviparus viviparus (Linnaeus, 1758)

Synonyms
- Helix vivipara Linnaeus, 1758; Viviparus fluviorum Montfort, 1810

= Viviparus viviparus =

Species of gastropod

Viviparus viviparus is a species of large freshwater snail with a gill and an operculum, an aquatic gastropod mollusk in the family Viviparidae, the river snails. This species is a viviparous (ovoviviparous) snail.

== Description ==
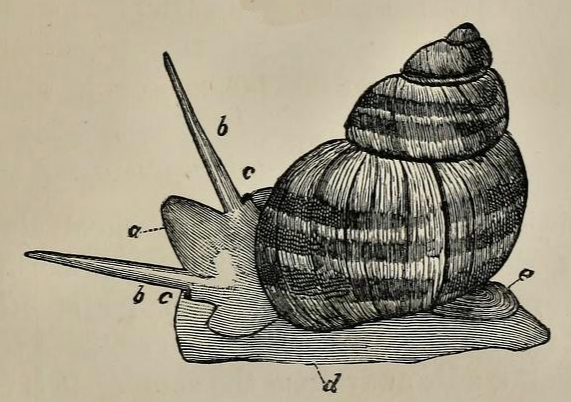
Drawing of the animal and shell of Viviparus viviparus; a) head b) tentacles c) eyes d) foot e) operculum

The height of the shell is 25–35 mm. The width of the shell is 20–26 mm. Males are 2 mm smaller than females of the same age. The shell colour is dark greenish brown or greyish yellow, with three reddish brown spiral bands. The shell is striated but has no hammer pattern. The shell apex is blunt (more pointed in other Viviparus species). The shell has 5.5-6 weakly convex whorls. The last whorl is relatively large compared to that of other Viviparus species. The umbilicus is narrow. The animal can lock itself in behind a round lid which shows concentric striations (the operculum). This allows it to protect itself from dehydration, for several months if necessary. Once closed the operculum is flush with the opening of the shell.

The operculum is attached to the dorsal surface of the rear of the foot of this gastropod, the body of which is wide and T-shaped, and the colour of which varies from spotted grey to greenish to orange. The mouth has a radula, and a respiratory siphon opens on the right side of the head, feeding gills which are located in front of the heart. This also allows the animal to filter the water. There are two short tentacles; the eyes are on the external side of each tentacle.

== Distribution and habitat ==
This is a European species, which is found in Romania, Slovenia, Croatia, Czech Republic (in Bohemia only), Germany, Netherlands, Poland, Great Britain, Ireland and other countries.

Viviparus viviparus is largely confined to major, slow-moving, lowland rivers and to lakes and prefers calcareous (base-rich) waters. They are often found in deep water. They are sometimes found in dense clusters (reaching thousands of individuals) on submerged branches and on various man-made objects present under water. More rarely, they are present more scattered in bottom mud, and then are much more discreet. They are also found in canals, artificial ponds, the water behind dams and in reservoirs, but usually not in small isolated standing waters. They require high oxygen content.

== Feeding ==
Viviparus viviparus species feeds on plankton and organic microdebris in suspension in the water and picked up through the siphon which allows the animal to breathe while filtering the water. This filter-feeding habit makes this snail popular with owners of ponds or aquariums where they are known to consume filamentous algae, some microalgae, cyanophytes and waste solids, and thus help to purify and clarify the water. This species may however carry some parasites.

== Reproduction ==
As its Latin name suggests, it is a viviparous (ovoviviparous) snail, a rare phenomenon among snails. The female gives birth to live young, after producing eggs that hatch internally. The naturalist Jan Swammerdam, was the first to recognize the viviparous character of this species to which he gave the name of Cochlea mirabilis and Cochlea vivipara but he seems not even have understood that there were males and females in this species (most other snails are hermaphroditic).

Then in 1863 Émile Baudelot clearly states that among the paludines (river snails) there are two distinct sexes The male system extends from the anterior end of the right tentacle to the top of the spire. We may consider it four distinct portions, which are going from top to bottom, the testis, vas deferens, seminal reservoir and the penis..

The male is distinguished by a shorter and round-tipped right tentacle, which also serves as a penis during fertilization:the female is usually slightly larger than the male at the same age, and it has two identical tentacles. Sexual maturity is reached after two years, when the snail is about 2 cm long. Each female bears eggs (up to 30 and at all stages of development) with a size of 3 to 7 mm in diameter and up to the full development of the embryo. At the time of their expulsion, the young are about 7 mm and their shell is already marked with the characteristic stripes of the river snails. After producing all its young, the female dies.

In 1879 Mathias Duval made studies of spermatogenesis in Viviparus viviparus)

== Other life ==
The principle predators of this species are fish and certain insects (Coleoptera, Hemiptera...) Viviparus viviparus is an intermediate host of several species of trematodes which finish their life cycles in mammals and birds.
