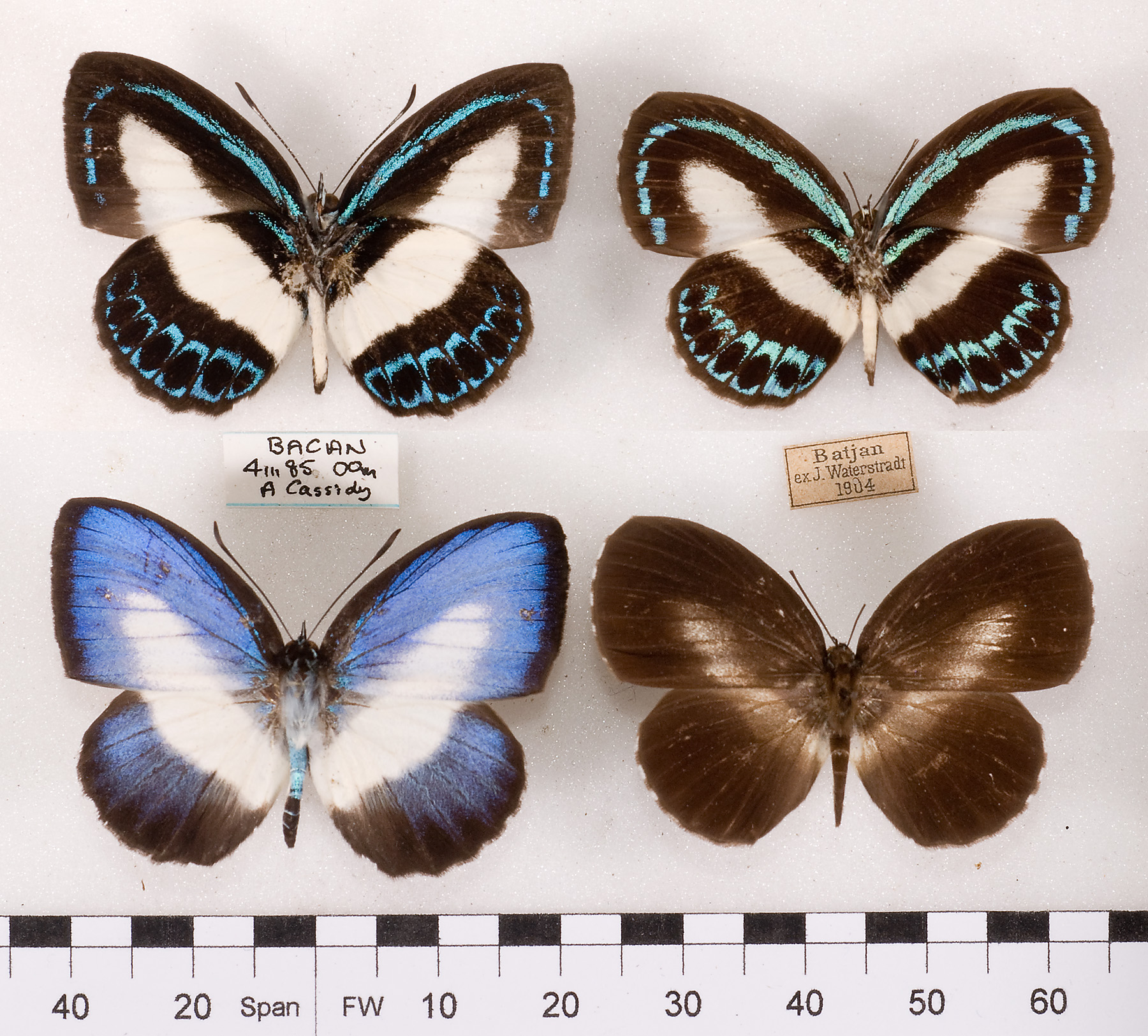
- D. d. philostratus

Scientific classification
- Domain: Eukaryota
- Kingdom: Animalia
- Phylum: Arthropoda
- Class: Insecta
- Order: Lepidoptera
- Family: Lycaenidae
- Genus: Danis
- Species: D. danis

Binomial name
- Danis danis (Cramer, 1775)

Synonyms
- Papilio danis Cramer, [1775]; Damis sebae Boisduval, [1832]; Thysonotis danis reverdini Fruhstorfer, 1915; Danis serapis Miskin, 1891; Danis syrius Miskin, 1890; Lycaena apollonius C. & R. Felder, [1865]; Thysonotis apollonius ab. plumbeus Rothschild, 1915; Thysonotis danis supous Druce & Bethune-Baker, 1893; Plebejus danis var. supoi Ribbe, 1889; Thysonitis triopus de Nicéville, 1898; Thysonotis hermes Grose-Smith, 1894; Thysonotis danis phoibides Fruhstorfer, 1915; Thysonotis zuleika Grose-Smith, 1898; Thysonotis regina Kirby, 1889; Thysonotis lampros Druce, 1897; Thysonotis lamprosides Grose-Smith, 1898; Thysonotis danis var. karpaia Druce & Bethune-Baker, 1893; Thysonotis danis philocrates Fruhstorfer, 1915; Thysonotis danis panatius Fruhstorfer, 1915; Thysonotis danis sophron Fruhstorfer, 1915; Thysonotis danis herophilus Fruhstorfer, 1915; Thysonotis danis anaximenes Fruhstorfer, 1915; Thysonotis danis proedrus Fruhstorfer, 1915; Lycaena philostratus C. & R. Felder, [1865]; Thysonotis dispar Grose-Smith & Kirby, 1895; Thysonotis dispar latifascia Rothschild, 1915; Thysonotis subsuleima Strand, 1916

= Danis danis =

Large green-banded blue

Species of butterfly

Danis danis, the large green-banded blue, is a species of butterfly in the family Lycaenidae. This species can be found in the Australia and New Guinea. Larvae feed on Alphitonia excelsa.

== Subspecies ==
- D. d. danis - Ambon
- D. d. serapis Miskin, 1891 - Australia: Cairns to Tully
- D. d. syrius Miskin, 1890 - Australia: Cape York
- D. d. apollonius (C. & R. Felder, 1865) - New Guinea
- D. d. supous (Druce & Bethune-Baker, 1893) - Aru
- D. d. triopus (de Nicéville, 1898) - Kai
- D. d. hermes (Grose-Smith, 1894) - West Irian
- D. d. zuleika (Grose-Smith, 1898) - Louisiades Archipelago
- D. d. regina (Kirby, 1889) - D'Entrecasteaux Archipelago
- D. d. lampros (Druce, 1897) - Trobriand Islands
- D. d. karpaia (Druce & Bethune-Baker, 1893) - Serang
- D. d. philocrates (Fruhstorfer, 1915) - Obi
- D. d. panatius (Fruhstorfer, 1915) - Salawatti
- D. d. sophron (Fruhstorfer, 1915) - Buru
- D. d. herophilus (Fruhstorfer, 1915) - Waigeu
- D. d. anaximenes (Fruhstorfer, 1915) - Kumusi
- D. d. proedrus (Fruhstorfer, 1915) - Owgarra
- D. d. philostratus (C. & R. Felder, 1865) - Bachan, Halmahera, Moratai, Ternate, Waigeu
- D. d. dispar (Grose-Smith & Kirby, 1895) - Bismarck Archipelago
- D. d. latifascia (Rothschild, 1915) - Admiralty Islands
