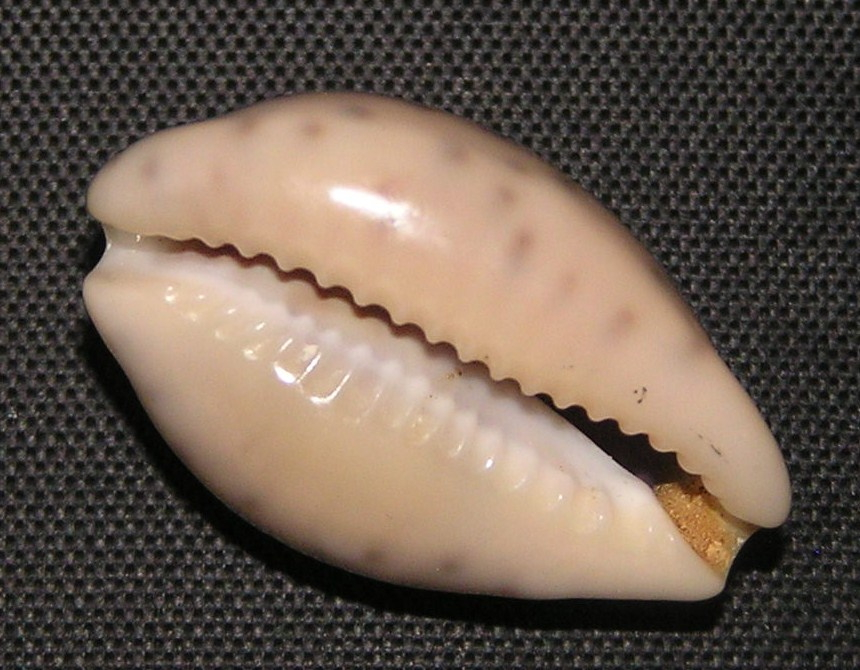
- Shell of Zonaria zonaria

Scientific classification
- Kingdom: Animalia
- Phylum: Mollusca
- Class: Gastropoda
- Subclass: Caenogastropoda
- Order: Littorinimorpha
- Family: Cypraeidae
- Genus: Zonaria
- Species: Z. zonaria

Binomial name
- Zonaria zonaria (Gmelin, 1791)

Synonyms
- Cypraea gambiensis H. Shaw, 1909 junior subjective synonym; Cypraea nebulosa Kiener, 1844 (invalid: junior homonym of Cypraea nebulosa Gmelin, 1791; Cypraea gambiensis H. Saw, 1909 is a replacement name); Cypraea zonaria Gmelin, 1791; Cypraea zonata Lamarck, 1810; Cypraea zonaria alba Blainville, 1826; Zonaria zonaria gambiensis (H. Shaw, 1909)

= Zonaria zonaria =

Species of gastropod

Zonaria zonaria is a species of sea snail, a cowry, a marine gastropod mollusk in the family Cypraeidae, the cowries.

== Subspecies ==
- Zonaria zonaria zonaria (Gmelin, 1791)
- Zonaria zonaria gambiensis (Shaw, 1909) synonym of Zonaria zonaria (Gmelin, 1791) (junior subjective synonym)

== Description ==
The shell size varies between 15mm and 47mm.

(Described as Zonaria zonata) shell is bluish or greenish, zoned across the middle with more or less distinct waved spots, marbled fulvous-brown. The sides and base are smoky brown, spotted with black, extremities painted black on both sides. The teeth are strong.

== Distribution ==
This species is found in the Atlantic Ocean off Cape Verde, Senegal, Gabon and Angola.
