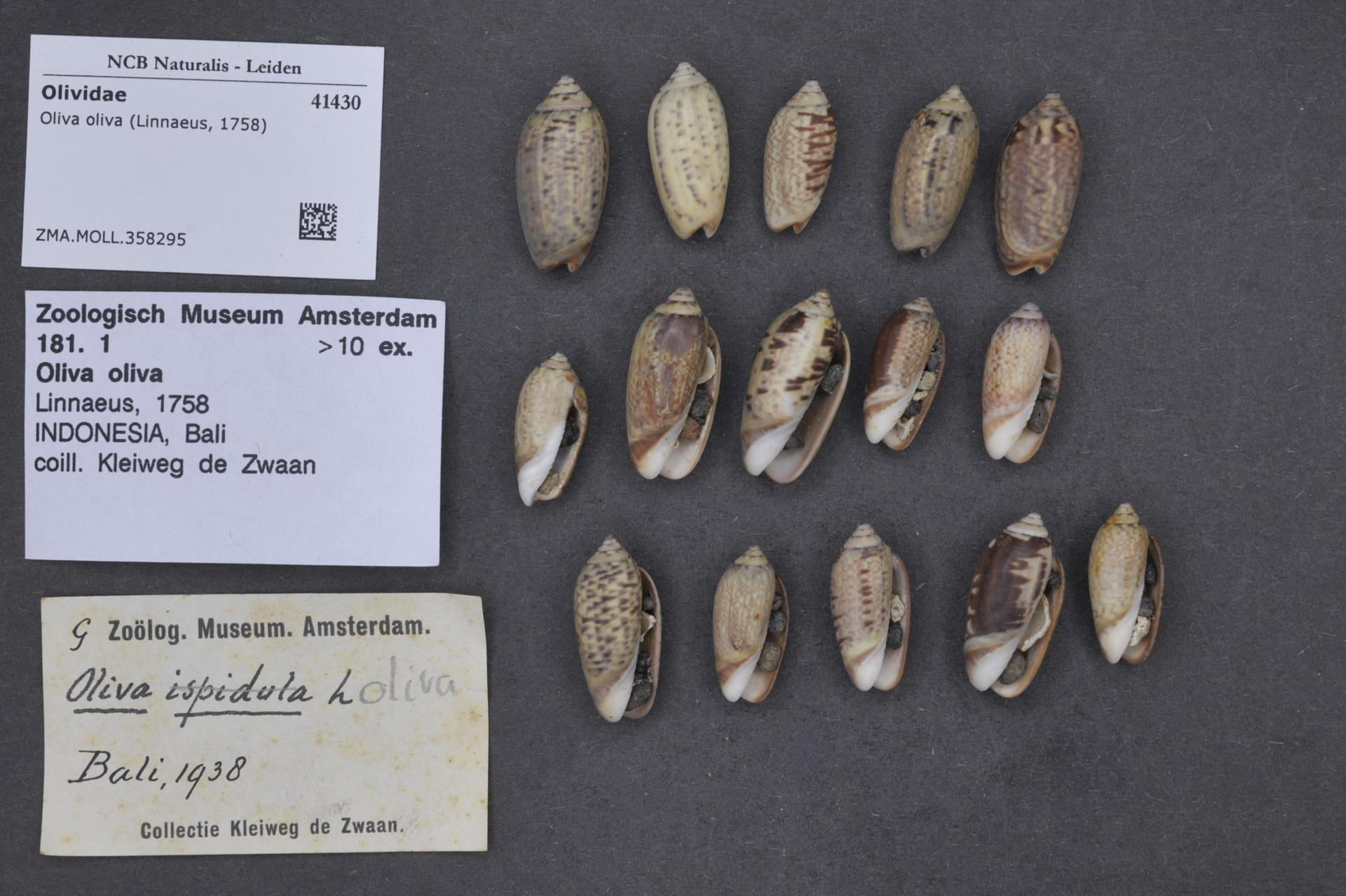
- Shell specimens of Oliva oliva at the Naturalis Biodiversity Center, showing variations in color and pattern

Scientific classification
- Kingdom: Animalia
- Phylum: Mollusca
- Class: Gastropoda
- Subclass: Caenogastropoda
- Order: Neogastropoda
- Family: Olividae
- Genus: Oliva
- Species: O. oliva

Binomial name
- Oliva oliva (Linnaeus, 1758)

Synonyms
- Oliva broderipii Ducros de Saint Germain, 1857; Oliva candida Lamarck, 1811; Oliva fenestrata Johnson, 1915; Oliva flaveola Duclos, 1835; Oliva oliva oliva (Linnaeus, 1758)· accepted, alternate representation; Oliva olorinella Duclos, 1835; Oliva pygmaea Reeve, 1850; Oliva reticularis olorinella Duclos, 1835; Oliva stelleta Duclos, 1835; Oliva variabilis Gray, 1858; Porphyria mica Röding, 1798; Porphyria ornata Röding, 1798; Porphyria punctata Röding, 1798; Porphyria umbrosa Röding, 1798; Voluta aurea Martini, 1773; Voluta oliva Linnaeus, 1758 (original combination)

= Oliva oliva =

Species of gastropod

Oliva oliva is a species of sea snail, a marine gastropod mollusc of the family Olividae, the olive snails.

This is the type species of the genus Oliva.

Subspecies
Oliva oliva longispira Bridgman, 1906

== Description ==
The length of the shell varies between 19 mm and 46 mm. The shells are generally fusiform and color is highly variable. Shell colors include white, yellow, orange, cream, white, brown and black. Patterns are variable as well. Zig-zags, triangles, spots, and other small shapes will appear on shells in borwn and black colors.

== Distribution ==
This marine species has a wide distribution and occurs from Southeast India into the Pacific.
