= Triaspiron =

- A: Lateral view of a male Triaspiron aphanii, showing rows of trunk spines. B: Immature female with trunk spines not shown to see the giant nuclei in the tegument. Scale bars are in µm.

Scientific classification
- Kingdom: Animalia
- Phylum: Acanthocephala
- Class: Eoacanthocephala
- Order: Gyracanthocephala
- Family: Quadrigyridae
- Subfamily: Pallisentinae
- Genus: Triaspiron; Smales, Aydogdu and Emre, 2012
- Species: T. aphanii

Binomial name
- Triaspiron aphanii Smales, Aydogdu and Emre, 2012
- The type locality for T. aphanii is Kirkgöz Springs, Antalya, Turkey.

Genus of parasitic worms

Triaspiron is a genus of Acanthocephala (thorny-headed or spiny-headed parasitic worms) containing a single known species, Triaspiron aphanii. Found in Turkey, it infests the iridescent toothcarp. The genus is described from a sample of 27 fish, of which 90% were infested with between one and fifteen worms There is no marked sexual dimorphism with worms reaching up to 2.1 millimetres (0.083 in) long (mostly trunk) and 0.59 millimetres (0.023 in) wide. The body consists of a small, wide, spindle shaped trunk and a cylindrical proboscis covered with hooks, which is used for feeding and attachment. The proboscis has 3 circles of 4 to 6 hooks front and two fields of 40 circular rows of spines used to pierce and hold the host's intestinal wall. This genus closely resembles the genus Raosentis but differs in the shape of the proboscis (not globular), proboscis armed with 16 hooks divided into three circles (not four circles), two separate fields of spines, and found outside of India, where Raosentis is limited.

The life cycle of T. aphanii remains unknown, but in common with other acanthocephalans, it likely involves a complex life cycle with at least two hosts. The intermediate host of Triaspiron has not been definitively identified, but it is believed to be an arthropod, such as an insect. Within this host, the larvae develop into an infectious stage called a cystacanth. When a vertebrate consumes the intermediate host, the cystacanths enter the vertebrate’s intestines where they mature into adult worms and reproduce sexually, and it becomes the definitive host. The resulting eggs are expelled and hatch into new larvae.

== Taxonomy ==
Triaspiron is a genus of acanthocephalans (also called thorny-headed or spiny-headed parasitic worms) containing only the type species, T. aphanii. The genus Triaspiron was circumscribed and species T. aphanii was formally described in 2012 by Smales, Aydogdu, and Emre. The genus name refers to the three (tri: meaning three in Latin) spiral rows (spira: meaning coil or twist in Latin) of hooks on the proboscis. The species name derives from the original name of the host genus name Aphanius before it was changed to Paraphanius.

The National Center for Biotechnology Information does not indicate that any phylogenetic analysis has been published on Triaspiron that would confirm its position as a unique order in the family Quadrigyridae. Triaspiron was placed in the family Quadrigyridae as it met the criterion of a small to medium-sized trunk with spines encircling the anterior trunk in regular rows, a globular to elongate proboscis with few hooks in spirals or circles and parasitizes fishes. It was further classified into the Pallisentinae subfamily due to meeting several morphological criteria: the anterior trunk is coated with spines in complete circles, the posterior trunk is either spineless, has incomplete rows of spines, or has irregularly placed spines, the posterior spines are less robust, the giant hypodermal nuclei are spherical, the principal lacunar canals are dorsal and ventral, the cerebral ganglion always at the base of the proboscis receptacle, and the lemnisci longer than the proboscis receptacle.

Triaspiron most closely resembles Raosentis by having a small spindle shaped trunk. Triaspiron differs from Raosentis in the shape of the proboscis (cylindrical not globular), proboscis armed with 16 hooks divided into three circles (not four circles), and a total of between 26 and 30 hooks in all. Triaspiron also differs by the spines on the trunk: there are two separate regions of spines in the anterior region arranged in up to 40 circular rows, not a single field with 9 to 17 rows of spines. Triaspiron also resembles the genus Acanthogyrus, by having three circles of hooks on the proboscis. Triaspiron differs from Acanthogyrus in having fewer proboscis hooks, 16 compared with between 18 and 24, that are arranged in three circles, one anterior circle followed by an unarmed region followed by two posteriorly circles instead of three circles of hooks evenly spaced. It also has two fields of trunk spines instead of one.

== Description ==
Anatomical measurements of T. aphanii
Measurements (Note: Based on 9 intact and 3 damaged males; 4 intact mature, 1 immature and 2 damaged females sampled from Kirkgöz Springs in Turkey.)	Female (µm)	Male (µm)
Length of proboscis	88–115	60–110
Width of proboscis	56–82	37–69
Length of proboscis receptacle	255–295	192–304
Width of proboscis receptacle	66–93	53–96
Length of neck	23–66	34–66
Maximum width of neck	66–132	65–85
Length of trunk	1610–2125	938–1870
Max width of trunk	264–595	201–408
Length of lemnisci	429–603	297–470
Size of eggs	37.5–39 x 10.5–12.0	
Size of testes		188–308 x 121–221 (anterior); 201–348 x 134–248 (posterior)

Triaspiron are a species of small spindle-shaped worms with no pronounced sexual dimorphism. The genus is defined by a trunk that is small and wide in the middle and narrows at both ends (fusiform).

The proboscis is small and cylindrical with 3 circles of 4 to 6 hooks each which are used to attach themselves to the intestines of the host. Specifically, the first circle has the six largest hooks (32–37 µm long) with simple roots almost as long as the blades. The second circle has four hooks and the third circle has six hooks all about same size (12–17 µm long) with roots shaped like a disc. The distance between first and second circle is about twice the distance between the second and third circles. The proboscis receptacle has only one wall with a cerebral ganglion near its base. The neck is short compared to other acanthocephalans.

In males, the trunk has regular circles of spines extending the entire length down to the cement glands. In females, the trunk has regular 40 circles of spines on the anterior half and irregular spines mostly ventral surfaces towards the posterior end of the trunk. The anterior and posterior spines are separated by a region without spines. Giant hypodermal (under the skin) nuclei are present in the body wall of the trunk (six dorsal and two ventral) and there are long, flat lemnisci (bundles of sensory nerve fibers).

In the male, the pair of testes are ovoid–cylindrical in shape and contiguous or fused together. The cement glands which are used to temporarily close the posterior end of the female after copulation, are syncytial and there is both a cement reservoir and Saefftigen's pouch.

== Distribution ==
The distribution of T. aphanii is determined by that of its hosts, which are found in Western Asia (Iraq, Israel, Jordan, Lebanon, Palestine, Syria and Turkey).. The parasites were only found from a sample of fish taken from Kirkgöz Springs, Antalya, Turkey, and it is unknown how the range of the parasite is coincident with the range of the host. The springs form a large natural lake at the foothills of the Taurus Mountains and serves as the primary source of the Düden River.

== Hosts ==
Life cycle of Acanthocephala. (Note: A 2001 survey of the literature found no known cases of human infection by T. aphanii.)

The life cycle of an acanthocephalan consists of three stages beginning when an infective acanthor (development of an egg) is released from the intestines of the definitive host and then ingested by an arthropod, the intermediate host. Although the intermediate hosts of Triaspiron are not known. When the acanthor molts, the second stage called the acanthella begins. This stage involves penetrating the wall of the mesenteron or the intestine of the intermediate host and growing. The final stage is the infective cystacanth which is the larval or juvenile state of an Acanthocephalan, differing from the adult only in size and stage of sexual development. The cystacanths within the intermediate hosts are consumed by the definitive host, usually attaching to the walls of the intestines, and as adults they reproduce sexually in the intestines. The acanthor is passed in the feces of the definitive host and the cycle repeats. There are no known paratenic hosts (hosts where parasites infest but do not undergo larval development or sexual reproduction) for Triaspiron.

Triaspiron was found to infest 90% of a sample of iridescent toothcarp (Paraphanius mento) (Note: Originally cited as Aphanius mento, this genus was split in 2020, into Apanius and Paraphanius.) with each infested fish hosting between 1 and 15 worms. There are no reported cases of any Triaspiron species infesting humans in the English language medical literature.
