= Pallisentis =

Scientific classification
- Kingdom: Animalia
- Phylum: Acanthocephala
- Class: Eoacanthocephala
- Order: Gyracanthocephala
- Family: Quadrigyridae
- Subfamily: Pallisentinae
- Genus: Pallisentis; Van Cleave, 1928

Genus of worms

Pallisentis is a genus in Acanthocephala (parasitic thorny-headed worms, also known as spiny-headed worms).

== Taxonomy ==
The genus Pallisentis has three subgenera: Brevitritospinus, Demidueterospinus, and Pallisentis. The National Center for Biotechnology Information indicates that a phylogenetic analysis has been published on Pallisentis celatus.

== Description ==
Pallisentis species consists of a proboscis covered in hooks and a trunk.

== Species ==
Pallisentis Van Cleave, 1928 is divided into three subgenera: Brevitritospinus, Demidueterospinus, and Pallisentis with 26 species:

- Pallisentis channai Gupta, Maurya and Saxena, 2015
- Pallisentis vinodai Gupta, Maurya and Saxena, 2015
  - Pallisentis (Brevitritospinus) Amin, Heckmann, Ha, Luc and Doanh, 2000
- Pallisentis allahabadii Agarwal, 1958
- Pallisentis cavasii Gupta and Verma, 1980
- Pallisentis croftoni Mital and Lal, 1981
- Pallisentis fasciati Gupta and Verma, 1980
- Pallisentis fotedari Gupta and Sinha, 1991
- Pallisentis guntei Sahay, Nath, and Sinha, 1967
- Pallisentis indica Mital and Lal, 1981
- Pallisentis mehrai Gupta and Fatma, 1986
- Pallisentis punctatiGupta, Gupta, and Singhal, 2015

Host: Channa punctatus in Bareilly, Uttar Pradesh, India.

- Pallisentis vietnamensis Amin, Heckmann, Ha, Luc and Doanh, 2000
  - Pallisentis (Demidueterospinus) Amin, Heckmann, Ha, Luc and Doanh, 2000
- Pallisentis basiri Farooqi, 1958
- Pallisentis ophiocephali (Thapar, 1931)
  - Pallisentis (Pallisentis) Van Cleave, 1928
- Pallisentis celatus (Van Cleave, 1928)
- Pallisentis cholodkowskyi (Kostylev, 1928)
- Pallisentis chongqingensis Liu and Zhang, 1993
- Pallisentis clupei Gupta and Gupta, 1980
- Pallisentis colisai Sarkar, 1956
- Pallisentis gaboes (Maccallum, 1918)
- Pallisentis garuai (Sahay, Sinha and Ghosh, 1971)
- Pallisentis gomtii Gupta and Verma, 1980
- Pallisentis guptai Gupta and Fatma, 1986
- Pallisentis jagani Koul, Raina, Bambroo and Koul, 1992
- Pallisentis kalriai Khan and Bilqees, 1985
- Pallisentis magnum Saeed and Bilgees, 1971
- Pallisentis nagpurensis' (Bhalerao, 1931)
- Pallisentis nandai Sarkar, 1953
- Pallisentis pesteri (Tadros, 1966)
- Pallisentis rexus Wongkham and Whitfield, 1999
- Pallisentis singaporensis Khan and Ip, 1988

P. singaporensis has 8 to 12 proboscis hooks per circle, gradually declining in size posteriorly. They measure from the anterior are 62 to 64, 49 to 54, 36 to 46 and 24 to 28 um long. The trunk spines are conical and do not extend to the posterior end in 25 or 26 circles, each with 10 spines. In the male, the cement gland is long and has 23 to 25 giant nuclei and lack Saefftigen's pouch. They have unequal lemnisci. The female gonopore is terminal.

- Pallisentis sindensis Khan and Bilqees, 1987
- Pallisentis umbellatus Van Cleave, 1928
- Pallisentis ussuriensis (Kostylev, 1941)

== Distribution ==
The distribution of Pallisentis species is determined by that of its hosts.

== Hosts ==
Life cycle of Acanthocephala. (Note: There are no known aberrant human infections for Pallisentis species.)

The life cycle of an acanthocephalan consists of three stages beginning when an infective acanthor (development of an egg) is released from the intestines of the definitive host and then ingested by an arthropod, the intermediate host. The intermediate hosts of most Pallisentis species are not known. When the acanthor molts, the second stage called the acanthella begins. This stage involves penetrating the wall of the mesenteron or the intestine of the intermediate host and growing. The final stage is the infective cystacanth which is the larval or juvenile state of an Acanthocephalan, differing from the adult only in size and stage of sexual development. The cystacanths within the intermediate hosts are consumed by the definitive host, usually attaching to the walls of the intestines, and as adults they reproduce sexually in the intestines. The acanthor is passed in the feces of the definitive host and the cycle repeats.

There are no reported cases of any Pallisentis species infesting humans in the English language medical literature.
