= Pararaosentis =

Scientific classification
- Kingdom: Animalia
- Phylum: Acanthocephala
- Class: Eoacanthocephala
- Order: Gyracanthocephala
- Family: Quadrigyridae
- Genus: Pararaosentis; Amin, Heckmann, Ha, Luc and Doanh, 2000
- Species: P. golvani

Binomial name
- Pararaosentis golvani (Troncy and Vassiliades, 1973)

Synonyms
- Pallisentis golvani Troncy and Vassiliades in 1973; Pallisentis tetraodontae Troncy, 1987

Genus of parasitic worms

Pararaosentis is a monotypic genus of acanthocephalans (thorny-headed or spiny-headed parasitic worms) containing a single species, Pararaosentis golvani.

== Taxonomy ==
Originally called Pallisentis golvani by Troncy and Vassiliades in 1973, it was combined with Pallisentis tetraodontae Troncy, 1987 by Amin and colleagues in 2000 to its present name. Pararaosentis golvani is the type species. Pararaosentis golvani was removed from the Pallisentis genus because it has a constriction of the anterior trunk (trunk is short and lacks anterior swelling unlike the long Pallisentis species), only one set of spines anteriorly, noncylindrical form of its testes and cement glands. It is also distinct in its distribution found in African and not Asian fishes. It also resembles Raosentis but the trunk is not constricted anteriorly, and the proboscis hooks in the anterior two circles are longer and stouter than the hooks in the posterior two circles and are separated from them by an unarmed area.

The National Center for Biotechnology Information does not indicate that any phylogenetic analysis has been published on Pararaosentis that would confirm its position as a unique order in the family Quadrigyridae.

== Description ==
The trunk is short with hypodermal nuclei and anterior constriction containing one set of minute spines arranged in a few complete circles, most anteriorly. The proboscis is short with four circles of small hooks gradually decreasing in length posterior. The proboscis receptible is single-walled with a large cerebral ganglion at its base. The male reproductive system is compacted in the posterior region with short robust and contiguous testes. Cement glands syncytial, small with a few giant nuclei and cement reservoir and Saefftigen's pouch are present.

== Distribution ==
The distribution of P. golvani is determined by that of its hosts. It is found in Africa.

== Hosts ==
Life cycle of Acanthocephala. (Note: There are no known aberrant human infections for P. golvani species.)

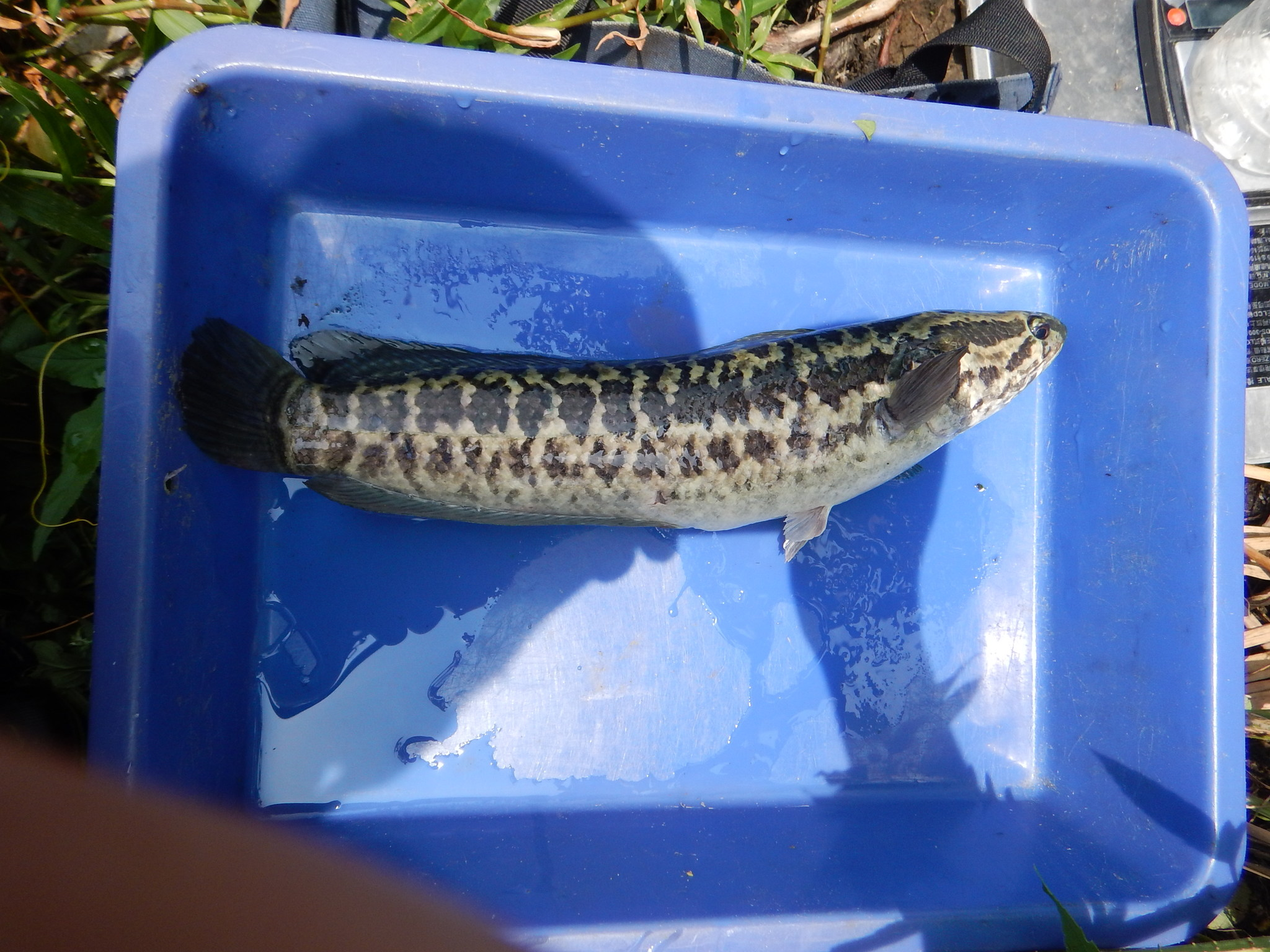
The Blotched snakehead is a host of P.

The life cycle of an acanthocephalan consists of three stages beginning when an infective acanthor (development of an egg) is released from the intestines of the definitive host and then ingested by an arthropod, the intermediate host. Although the intermediate hosts of Pararaosentis are not known. When the acanthor molts, the second stage called the acanthella begins. This stage involves penetrating the wall of the mesenteron or the intestine of the intermediate host and growing. The final stage is the infective cystacanth which is the larval or juvenile state of an Acanthocephalan, differing from the adult only in size and stage of sexual development. The cystacanths within the intermediate hosts are consumed by the definitive host, usually attaching to the walls of the intestines, and as adults they reproduce sexually in the intestines. The acanthor are passed in the feces of the definitive host and the cycle repeats. There are no known paratenic hosts (hosts where parasites infest but do not undergo larval development or sexual reproduction) for Pararaosentis.

Parasitizes the Blotched snakehead (Channa maculata)) (Note: Originally reported as Ophiocephalus maculatus). There are no reported cases of any Pararaosentis species infesting humans in the English language medical literature.
