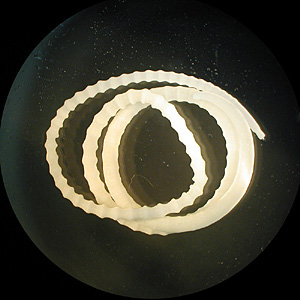
- Adult Moniliformis moniliformis

Scientific classification
- Kingdom: Animalia
- Phylum: Acanthocephala
- Class: Archiacanthocephala
- Order: Moniliformida
- Family: Moniliformidae
- Genus: Moniliformis; Travassos, 1915

= Moniliformis =

Genus of worms

Moniliformis is a genus of parasitic worms in the Acanthocephala phylum.

== Taxonomy ==
Genetic analysis has been conducted on four species: Moniliformis moniliformis, M. saudi, M. cryptosaudi and M. kalahariensis. Based on these results, Moniliformidae has been determined to be monophyletic.

Archiacanthocephala

- Archiacanthocephala
  - Oligacanthorhynchidae
    - Macracanthorhynchus ingens
    - Oncicola venezuelensis
    - Oligacanthorhynchus tortuosa
    - Nephridiacanthus major
  - - Moniliformidae
      Moniliformis moniliformis
    - Gigantorhynchida
      - Mediorhynchus sp.
      - Gigantorhynchus echinodiscus

Phylogenetic reconstruction for select species in the class Archiacanthocephala

== Description ==
Species of the genus Moniliformis are usually pseudosegmented and have a cylindrical proboscis with longitudinal rows of hooks that have posteriorly directed roots. Moniliformis species are further characterized by the presence of a simple, double-walled proboscis receptacle with the outer wall having spirally aligned muscle fibers, brain at posterior end of receptacle, and dorsal and ventral lacunar canals. The proboscis retractor muscles pierce both the posterior and ventral end or just posterior end of the receptacle. The cerebral ganglion is in the mid to posterior region, and the lemnisci are long and flat and not bound to the body wall. These worms also lack protonephridia and males have eight cement glands, each with a giant nucleus, which are used to temporarily close the posterior end of the female after copulation.

== Species ==
M. acomysi
Measurements	Female (mm)	Male (mm)
Length of proboscis	0.20–0.43	0.19–0.36
Width of proboscis	0.14–0.22	0.12–0.21
Length of proboscis receptacle	0.68–0.84	0.68–0.84
Width of proboscis receptacle	0.24–0.33	0.24–0.33
Length of trunk	22–89	12–76
Width of trunk	0.56–1.50	0.26–1.50
Size of lemnisci	2.73–4.42 × 0.13–0.23	2.73–4.42 × 0.13–0.23
Size of testis	2.31 × 0.52–0.65	
Size of cement glands	0.300	
Size of eggs	0.07–0.09 x 0.03–0.05	

M. aegyptiacus
Measurements	Female (mm)
Length of proboscis	0.35
Width of proboscis	0.16–0.18
Length of proboscis receptacle	0.75
Length of trunk	115
Length of lemnisci	5.25–6.0
Size of eggs	0.09–0.1 x 0.04–0.05

M. amini
Measurements	Female (mm)	Male (mm)
Length of proboscis	0.28–0.30	0.27
Width of proboscis	0.10–0.11	0.09
Length of proboscis receptacle	0.54–0.64	0.40
Width of proboscis receptacle	0.18–0.25	0.17
Length of trunk	63.96–120.83	20.21
Width of trunk	0.90–1.22	0.82
Length of lemnisci	6.90–11.90	5.40
Size of anterior testis	1.80 × 0.60	
Size of posterior testis	1.80 × 0.50	
Size of region occupied by cement glands	0.40 × 0.17	
Size of eggs	0.06 x 0.02	
Length of uterine bell	1.17	
Distance from the uterine bell to genital pore	1.08	

The genus Moniliformis Travassos, 1915 contains nineteen species. (Note: A binomial authority in parentheses indicates that the species was originally described in a genus other than the present genus.) Description of the genus is the same as the family Moniliformidae with the exception of possessing spiral muscles in the outer wall of the proboscis receptacle and a single distinct kind of proboscis hooks.

- Moniliformis acomysi Ward and Nelson, 1967

M. acomysi was found infesting the Cairo spiny mouse (Acomys cahirinus) in South Sinai, Egypt. The proboscis has eleven to sixteen longitudinal rows of hooks with six to ten hooks per row with the largest hooks being apical and range from 21 to 29 mm long in the male and 23 to 31 mm long in the female. There are eight cement glands in the male and the eggs of the female are oval. The species name acomysi derives from the host genus name Acomys.

- Moniliformis aegyptiacus Meyer, 1932

M. aegyptiacus infests Meriones sinaiticus and the four-toed jerboa (Allactaga tetradactyla reported as Scarturus tetradactylus) in Egypt and the North African hedgehog (Atelerix algirus reported as Erinaceus algiris) in Tunis. The proboscis has 96 hooks arranged in twelve longitudinal rows with eight hooks per row. The eggs are oval. The species name aegyptiacus derives from locality of the host, Egypt.

- Moniliformis amini Martins, del Rosario Robles, and Navone 2017

M. amini was found in the small intestine parasitising the olive grass mouse (Abrothrix olivaceus) in the Santa Cruz Province, Argentina. The species name amini was named after Omar Amin, a parasitologist specializing in Acanthocephala. Sexual dimorphism is pronounced with female over four times longer than the male. The proboscis has 12 to 14 longitudinal rows of hooks with 10 to 12 hooks per row with the largest hooks in the female being apical ranging from 22.21 to 24.47 μm, the middle being 15.50 μm long and the posterior being the smallest at 12 μm long. The largest hooks in the male are 24 μm. There are eight cement glands in the male, the eggs are oval.

- Moniliformis cestodiformis (Linstow, 1904) (Note: M. cestodiformis originally named Echinorhynchus cestodiformis by von Linstow in 1904 but was renamed by Travassos in 1917. It is synonymous with Moniliformis erinacei Southwell and Macfie, 1925)

M. cestodiformis has been found infesting hedgehogs of the genus Erinaceus in West Africa. The proboscis is between 400 and 500 μm long and 200 μm wide with 16 to 18 rows of 7 or 8 hooks each and no apical pores. The largest hooks are found anteriorly and are 30 to 32 μm long with no dorsoventral differences. The eggs have 4 membranes and are 85 to 92 μm long and 49 to 51 μm wide giving them an elongation ratio of 1.73.

- Moniliformis clarki (Ward, 1917) (Note: M. clarki was originally named Hormorhynchus clarki by Ward in 1917 but was renamed by Chandler in 1921. It is synonymous with M. spiradentatis Mcleod, 1933.)

M. Clarki
Measurements	Female (mm)	Male (mm)
Length of proboscis	?	0.41–0.52
Width of proboscis	?	0.13–0.14
Length of proboscis receptacle	?	0.65–0.67
Width of proboscis receptacle	?	0.32–0.33
Length of trunk	120–250	61–85
Width of trunk	2.10–2.80	1.60–2.00
Length of lemnisci	?	3.46–4.79 × 0.13–0.18
Size of anterior testis	3.30–5.62 × 0.72–1.15	
Size of posterior testis	3.97–4.29 × 0.72–1.17	
Size of eggs	0.05–0.09 x 0.03–0.0	

M. clarki commonly infects squirrels, chipmunks, deer mice, and gophers in North America. If left untreated, it can kill its host. Ten cotton-top tamarins (Saguinus oedipus) were infected at the St. Louis Zoo with at least one being killed by the parasite. Eggs of what is thought to be M. clarki due to the heavy population of common rodent hosts were discovered while examining human coprolite specimens gathered from Danger Cave in Utah. It was theorized that the man had either eaten a raw insect or an under cooked rodent. The female is twice as long than the male. The proboscis has 12 or 13 longitudinal rows of hooks with six or seven hooks per row with the largest hooks being 23 to 28 mm long. The eggs have 4 membranes and are 75 μm long and have an elongation ratio of 2.42.

- Moniliformis convolutus Meyer, 1932

M. convolutus has been found infesting the large flying fox (Pteropus vampyrus) in Brazil. The proboscis is 500 μm long by 200 μm wide with 12 rows of 11 or 12 hooks each. The posterior hooks are rootless and the proboscis receptacle is 700 μm long.

- Moniliformis cryptosaudi Amin, Heckmann, Sharifdini, and Albayati, 2019

M. cryptosaudi is a cryptic species with M. saudi being morphologically identical, apart from the metal content of the hooks, but genetically distinct. The hooks consist of a collagen material with very low levels of phosphorus and calcium which is in contrast to those of M. saudi which has high levels of these two metals. The trunk is between 20.50 ad 48.75 mm long by 0.72 to 1.05 mm wide in the male and 28.75 to 121.25 mm long by 0.65 to 2.25 mm wide in the much larger female. The anterior trunk tapers in a fan-shaped pattern and has a collar of vertical plates. The proboscis is between 343 and 416 μm long by 135 and 188 μm wide in the male and 300 to 416 μm long by 162 to 291 μm wide in the female. The proboscis is armed with 13 to 14 rows of hooks each containing 7 or 8 hooks with the largest being found anteriorly and measuring 25 to 35 μm long in the female and 16 to 25 μm long in the male. The ventral hooks longer than dorsal hooks. The proboscis receptacle is 624 to 1092 μm by 218 to 364 μm in the female and 551 to 936 μm by 200 to 291 μm in the male. The long lemnisci has 6 to 8 giant nuclei and measures 4.26 to 7.28 mm by 0.12 to 0.18 mm in the male and has 6 to 9 giant nuclei and measures 4.15 to 8.12 mm by 0.11 to 0.21 mm in the female. The short lemnisci has 3 or 4 giant nuclei and measures 3.74 to 5.72 mm by 0.09 to 0.15 mm in the male and has 5 or 6 giant nuclei and measures 2.18 to 7.25 mm by 0.11 to 0.21 mm in the female. The anterior testes are 1.65 to 3.67 mm by 0.40 to 0.62 mm in size and the posterior testes are 1.50 to 2.62 mm by 0.37 to 0.62 mm in size. In the male, the cement glands are 322 to 780 μm by 229 to 416 μm and Saefftigen's pouch measures 624 to 925 μm by 270 to 425 μm. In the female, The eggs are oval, measuring 50 to 104 μm by 25 to 36 μm.

The species name cryptosaudi refers to this cryptic status with M. saudi. It has been found in the intestine infesting the long-eared Hedgehog (Hemiechinus auritus) near Baqubah, Iraq.

- Moniliformis echinosorexi Deveaux, Schmidt and Krishnasamy, 1988

M. echinosorexi has been found infesting the moonrat (Echinosorex gymnurus) in Malaysia but may also infect hedgehogs. The worms have 12 to 15 rows of between 11 and 13 hooks that change from 34 to 36 μm long. The proboscis receptacle is 1.2 to 2.0 mm long. Males are between 95 and 98 mm long whereas females are longer ranging from 126 to 192 mm long. The proboscis is relatively large ranging from 690 to 1000 μm long with 12 to 15 rows of containing 11 and 13 hooks each. The posterior hooks do not have roots. The proboscis receptacle is large at 1.2 mm long in males and 2.0 mm long in females. The testes are relatively large being between 5.6 and 6.8 mm long. Lemnisci are similarly long at with three giant nuclei each. The species name echinosorexi derives from the genus of the host, Echinosorex.

- Moniliformis gracilis (Rudolphi, 1819) (Note: M. gracilis was originally named Echinorhynchus gracilis by Rudolphi in 1819 but was renamed by Meyer in 1931.)

M. gracilis is a parasite of the European roller (Coracias garrullus) in Europe. The worms are very small being only 2.25 to 3.00 mm long. The proboscis has 10 rows each with 8 or 9 hooks with the largest hooks on the anterior portion. The ganglion at the base of the short receptacle is 360 μm long.

- Moniliformis ibunami
- Moniliformis kalahariensis Meyer, 1931

M. kalahariensis was found infesting the Southern African Hedgehog (Atelerix frontalis) in Mohlonong and at the University of Limpopo in the Limpopo Province, South Africa. and Namaqua sandgrouse (Pterocles namaqua) in Botswana. The intermediate host is the German cockroach (Blattella germanica).

Juvelines are unsegmented whereas adults are pseudosegmented. There are 2 apical sensory pores on the proboscis. Males trunk is between 44.25 and 75.00 mm long by 1.62 and 1.75 mm wide whereas the females are larger being 51.25 to 81.25 mm long by 2.00 to 2.25 mm wide. In the male, proboscis 780 long by 384 wide and 763 to 863 μm long by 374 to 426 μm wide in the female. The proboscis has 15 or 16 usually straight rows of between 9 and 11 hooks. In the male, the rooted hooks measure 29 to 30 μm, 41 to 47 μm, 55 to 57 μm, 55 to 56 μm from the anterior and the spings spiniform hooks measure 67 to 75 μm, 75 to 77 μm, 65 to 75 μm, 60 to 62 μm, 57 to 60 μm, 35 to 40 μm from the anterior. Proboscis receptacle 1.52 mm long by 0.52 mm wide in the male and 1.75 to 1.80 mm long by 0.47 to 0.55 mm wide in the female. The lemnisci are 18.75 mm long by 0.17 mm wide male and 13.75 to 16.25 mm long by 0.24 to 0.27 mm wide female.

The male reproductive system is located in the posterior part of trunk. The testes are elongate with the anterior testis measuring between 3.50 and 6.87 mm long by 0.75 and 1.25 mm wide and the posterior testis measuring between 4.05 and 5.55 mm long by 0.95 and 1.32 mm wide. Cement glands are located posterior of the testes in cluster of 8 and measure between 0.87 and 2.50 mm long by 0.50 and 1.07 mm wide with the anterior glands being the largest. Saefftigen's pouch is 1.62 to 1.75 mm long by 0.50 to 0.57 mm wide. In the juvenile, the reproductive system is underdeveloped, with ovoid testes and occasionally lacking cement glands. The female reproductive system measures 572 to 946 μm in total length but lacks vaginal muscles. The uterus is thick and double-walled measuring 343 to 624 μm long and well-developed ligaments hold the distal end of uterus to body wall. The uterine bell is between 208 and 343 μm long and contains many nuclei. The eggs are ovoid being 73 to 114 μm long by 31 to 62 μm wide and are notched at one pole.

- Moniliformis moniliformis (Bremser, 1811) (Note: M. moniliformis originally named Echinorhynchus moniliformis by Bremser in 1811 but was renamed by Travassos in 1915. It is synonymous with E. grassiRailliet, 1893, E. canis Porter, 1914, E. belgicus Railliet, 1919, M. dubius Meyer, 1932, and M. travassosi Meyer, 1932)

M. moniliformis
Measurements	Female (mm)	Male (mm)
Length of proboscis		
Width of proboscis		
Length of proboscis receptacle		
Width of proboscis receptacle		
Length of trunk		
Width of trunk		
Length of lemnisci		
Size of anterior testis		
Size of posterior testis		
Size of region occupied by cement glands		
Size of eggs		
Length of uterine bell		

M. moniliformis is a globally distributed parasite where the adult worms are usually found in intestines of rodents or carnivores such as cats and dogs but can on rare occasions infest humans. The intermediate hosts are usually beetles and cockroaches.

The male averages 77 mm long and 1.66 mm wide whereas the female is much larger at 140 mm long and 1.24 mm wide. The scolex of this worm has a cylindrical proboscis and a multitude of curved hooks. The proboscis of both genders are 0.50 mm long and between 1.19 and 1.24 mm wide and the proboscis receptacle is between 0.89 and 1.07 mm long and 0.27 and 0.28 mm wide. The proboscis has 11 to 12 longitudinal rows of hooks with 9 to 14 hooks per row with the largest hooks range from 20 to 30 mm long in the male and 31 mm long in the female. Because of horizontal markings on the worm, there is the appearance of segmentation. The lemnisci are between 4.00 and 7.50 mm by 0.15 and 0.17 mm. Males have testes that are between 2.20 and 3.00 mm by 0.50 to 0.80 mm, copulatory bursas used to hold on to the female during copulation, and eight cement glands that occupy an area of between 0.6 and 1.26 mm by 0.40 to 0.60 mm. Females have floating ovaries within a ligament sac where fertilization of the eggs, which are oval in shape with a thick, clear outer coat measuring between 0.11 and 0.12 mm long by 0.04 and 0.06 mm wide, occurs. Another report states the eggs also have 4 membranes and are 75 μm long and have an elongation ratio of 2.42.

In the life cycle of M. moniliformis, the intermediate hosts ingest the eggs of the parasite. In the intermediate host, the acanthor, or the parasite in its first larval stage, morphs into the acanthella, the second larval stage. After 6 to 12 weeks in this stage, the acanthella becomes a cystacanth. The cystacanth, or infective acanthella, of M. moniliformis are cyst-shaped and encyst in the tissues of the intermediate hosts in contrast to most other acanthocephalans which have infective larvae that more closely resemble underdeveloped adult worms. The definitive hosts consume the cystacanths upon feeding on infested intermediate hosts. These cystacanths mature and mate in the small intestine in 8 to 12 weeks. After this time, the eggs are excreted with the feces, to be ingested yet again by another intermediate host and renew this cycle. In what is commonly known as "brain-jacking," the parasite induces a behavioural change in its intermediate host that increases the risk of predation for the host. It is thought that this behavioral change holds an evolutionary advantage for the parasite by increasing its chances of getting to its definitive host. When M. moniliformis infests its intermediate host, the cockroach species Periplaneta americana, it changes the cockroach's escape response. In one study, it was concluded that cockroaches infected by M. moniliformis took longer to respond to wind stimuli simulating the approach of a potential predator and displayed fewer escape responses implying that the parasite infection renders its intermediate host more vulnerable to predation by hindering its ability to detect and escape from its predator. It is thought that serotonin plays a role in upending the communication between giant interneurons and the thoracic interneurons and in turn hampers the escape response of the cockroach. In a similar study, the effects of parasitism on three Periplaneta species found that Periplaneta australasiae uses substrates differently and moves around less when infected with M. moniliformis. Another study concludes an increased vulnerability of infected Periplaneta americana due to increased phototaxis, more time spent moving (due to slower movement) and movement in response to light (uninfected cockroaches hesitated before moving).

Cases of moniliformiasis, a form of acanthocephaliasis, caused by human infestation by M. moniliformis have been reported in the United States, Iran, Iraq, and Nigeria, but human moniliformiasis is now rare as it requires consumption of raw infested beetles or cockroaches. Calandruccio provided the first description of the clinical manifestations of moniliformiasis and similar accounts are found in the few case studies since; many of the patients described were asymptomatic. When they showed symptoms, they normally experienced abdominal pain, diarrhea, dizziness, edema, and anorexia. In some patients, giddiness has also been reported. In rodents, moniliformiasis is fatal and manifests itself through hemorrhaging and gastrointestinal disturbance.

- Moniliformis monoechinus (Linstow, 1902) (Note: M. monoechinus was originally named Echinorhynchus monechinus by Linstow in 1902 but was given its present name by Petrochenko in 1958. It is often incorrectly spelled M. monechinus.)

M. monoechinus was found infesting the Giant anteater (Myrmecophaga tridactyla) in South America. The proboscis is very long measuring 3.55 mm long by 0.71 mm wide with 12 rows of 40 hooks each. The largest hooks are 130 μm long and found anteriorly and are shorter, 30 μm long, on the posterior portion.

- Moniliformis necromysi Gomes, Costa, Gentile, Vilela and Maldonado, 2020

M. necromysi has been found infesting the hairy-tailed bolo mouse (Necromys lasiurus) in the cerrado in the state of Minas Gerais, Brazil. Phylogenetic analyses using the partial mitochondrial cytochrome c oxidase subunit I gene and the nuclear large subunit ribosomal RNA gene demonstrated that this worm forms a well-supported monophyletic group within the genus Moniliformis. The species name necromysi derives from the genus name of the host species Necromys.

- Moniliformis saudi Amin, Heckmann, Mohammed, & Evans, 2016

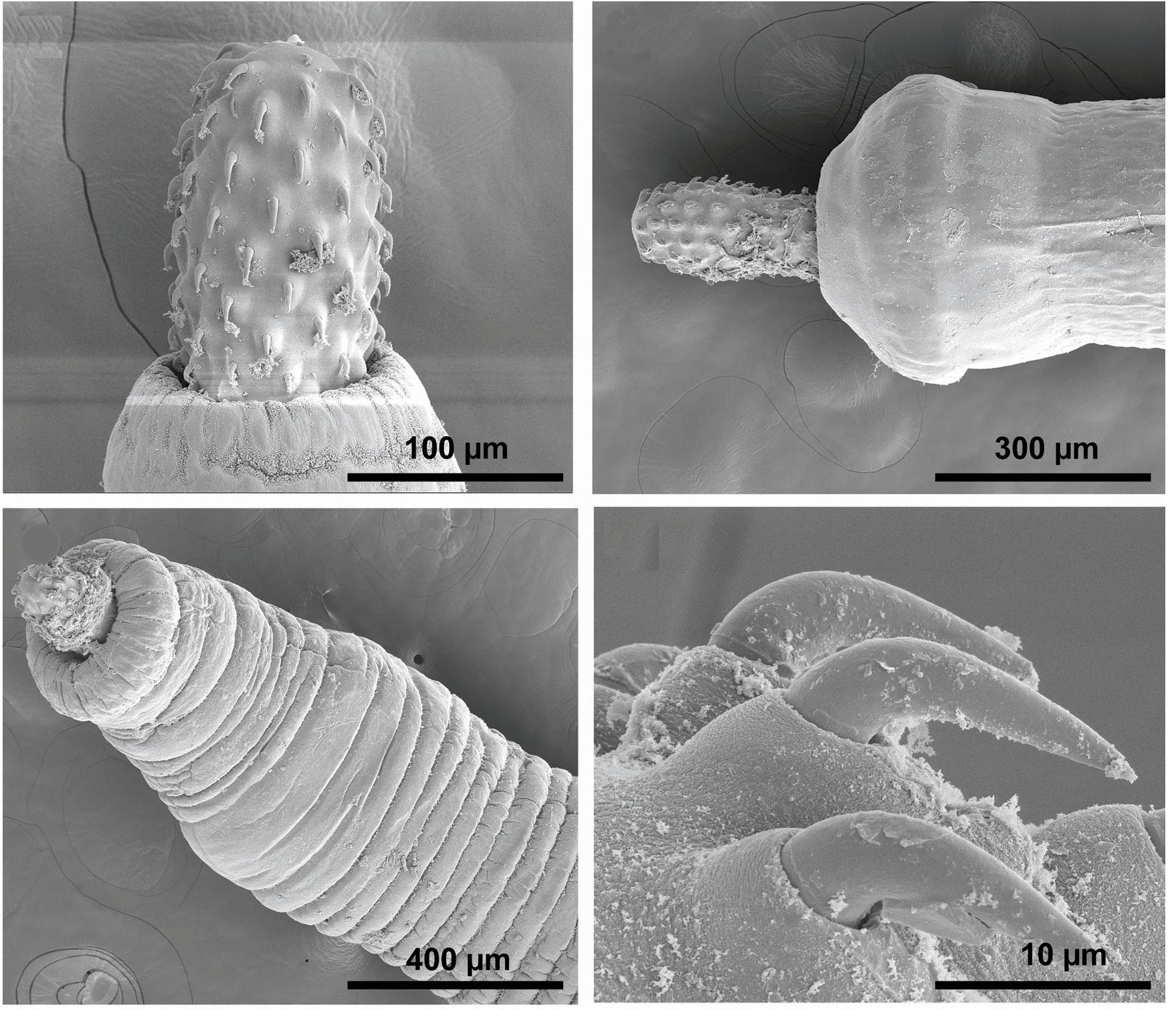
The proboscis of Moniliformis saudi

M. saudi has been found parasitizing the desert hedgehog (Paraechinus aethiopicus) in Saudi Arabia. The species was named after the country Saudi Arabia in which it was discovered. M. saudi is morphologically identical to M. cryptosaudi, apart from the metal content of the hooks and genetic analysis.

The trunk is between 24.00 and 50.00 mm long by 0.67 and 1.15 mm wide in the male and 18.00 to 117.50 mm long by 0.60 to 1.82 mm wide in the much larger female. The anterior trunk tapers in a fan-shaped pattern and has a collar of vertical plates. The proboscis is between 315 and 520 μm long by 130 and 177 μm wide in the male and 354 to 468 μm long by 130 to 208 μm wide in the female. The proboscis is armed with 13 to 14 rows of hooks each containing 7 or 8 hooks with the largest being found anteriorly and measuring 25 to 31 μm long in the female and 25 to 27 μm long in the male. The ventral hooks longer than dorsal hooks. The proboscis receptacle is 718 to 1250 μm by 155 to 322 μm in the female and 603 to 880 μm by 190 to 300 μm in the male. The long lemnisci and measures 2.91 to 8.75 mm by 0.08 to 0.17 mm in the male and measures 3.30 to 12.50 mm by 0.11 to 0.22 mm in the female. The short lemnisci and measures 2.81 to 5.75 mm by 0.07 to 0.14 mm in the male and measures 3.02 to 11.25 mm by 0.10 to 0.17 mm in the female. There are has 7 to 10 giant nuclei in the lemnisci. The anterior testes are 1.25 to 3.50 mm by 0.27 to 0.82 mm in size and the posterior testes are 1.12 to 3.50 mm by 0.27 to 0.65 mm in size. In the male, the cement glands are 312 to 811 μm by 270 to 468 μm and Saefftigen's pouch measures 468 to 1400 μm by 177 to 450 μm. In the female, The eggs are oval, measuring 57 to 83 μm by 31 to 42 μm.

- Moniliformis siciliensis Meyer, 1932 (Note: M. siciliensis is synonymous with M. pseudosegmentatus (Knüppfer, 1888))

M. siciliensis
Measurements	Female (mm)	Male (mm)
Length of proboscis		
Width of proboscis		
Length of proboscis receptacle		
Width of proboscis receptacle		
Length of trunk		
Width of trunk		
Length of lemnisci		
Size of anterior testis		
Size of posterior testis		
Size of region occupied by cement glands		
Size of eggs		
Length of uterine bell		

M. siciliensis has been found infesting the brown rat (Rattus norvegicus reported as Mus decumanus), and the garden dormouse (Eliomys quercinus) in Sicily, Italy. The male is between 40 and 45 mm long by 1.0 and 1.50 mm wide whereas the female is much larger between 70 and 80 mm long by 1.0 and 1.50 mm wide. The proboscis is between 0.42 and 0.45 mm long by 0.17 to 0.19 mm wide in the male and female. The proboscis has 14 longitudinal rows of hooks with 8 hooks per row. The lemnisci are 10.0 by 0.17 mm. The eggs are oval being 0.08 mm long by 0.04 mm wide.

- Moniliformis spiralis Subrahmanian, 1927

M. spiralis
Measurements	Female (mm)	Male (mm)
Length of proboscis		
Width of proboscis		
Length of proboscis receptacle		
Width of proboscis receptacle		
Length of trunk		
Width of trunk		
Length of lemnisci		
Size of anterior testis		
Size of posterior testis		
Size of region occupied by cement glands		
Size of eggs		
Length of uterine bell		

M. spiralis been found infesting Nesokia bengalensis and the black rat (Rattus rattus) in Rangoon, Burma. It has also been found in India infesting a species of Bandicota and Herpestes, and in bats in Kyrgyzstan. The male is 16.94 mm long and 0.56 mm wide whereas the female is much larger at 40 mm long and 0.91 mm wide. The proboscis of the male is 0.43 mm long and 0.11 mm wide and in the female is between 0.35 and 0.47 mm long and 0.17 to 0.18 mm wide. The proboscis receptacle of the male is 0.64 to 0.85 mm long and 0.24 to 0.30 mm wide and in the female it is 0.98 mm long and 0.31 mm wide. The proboscis has 12 to 14 longitudinal rows of hooks with 12 to 14 hooks per row with the largest hooks being 40 mm long. The lemnisci are 0.81 by 0.25 mm. The anterior testes are 0.81 by 0.25 mm and the posterior testes are 0.85 by 0.28 mm. There are six to eight cement glands 0.53 by 0.21 mm in size. The eggs are oval being 0.06 mm long by 0.03 mm wide and the genital pore is terminal and 0.91 by 0.48 mm.

- Moniliformis tarsii Deveaux, Schmidt and Krishnasamy, 1988

M. tarsii was found infesting the small and large intestines of Horsfield's tarsier (Tarsius bancanus) in Poring, Sabah, Malaysia. The male is 15 to 19 mm long and 800 to 900 μm wide whereas the female is larger being 21 to 41 mm long and 0.73 to 1.57 mm wide with a trunk lacking pseudosegmentation. The proboscis in the male is 490 μm long and 240 μm wide and in the female is 490 to 560 μm long and 230 to 320 μm wide. The proboscis is armed with 11 or 12 regularly alternating longitudinal rows of 6 or 7 hooks with the intermediate hooks being considerably larger than the others. Anterior hooks measure 26 to 37 μm, the next two hooks measure 41 to 55 μm, all three of which have powerful roots, whereas the remaining hooks four through seven measure 24 to 28 μm and have weak roots. The lemnsici are flat with three giant nuclei each and reach about 25–30% of the body length and are not bound posteriorly to the inner body wall. In the male, the anterior testes are 1.66 to 1.88 mm long and 330 μm wide, and the posterior testes are 1.5 mm long and 430 μm wide. The males also have eight cement glands each with a single giant nucleus located posterior to the testes. In the female, the uterine bell is 1.03 mm from posterior and eggs are very small and oval, being 47 to 55 μm long and 16 to 21 μm wide. The species name tarsii derives from the genus name of the host Tarsius.

- Moniliformis travassosi Meyer, 1932

M. travassosi
Measurements	Female (mm)	Male (mm)
Length of proboscis		
Width of proboscis		
Length of proboscis receptacle		
Width of proboscis receptacle		
Length of trunk		
Width of trunk		
Length of lemnisci		
Size of anterior testis		
Size of posterior testis		
Size of region occupied by cement glands		
Size of eggs		
Length of uterine bell		

M. travassosi was found infesting the brown rat (Rattus norvegicus) in Brazil. The male measures between 60 and 80 mm long by 1.0 and 1.5 mm wide whereas the female is between 100 and 110 mm long and 1.5 mm wide. The proboscis has 14 longitudinal rows of hooks with 15 hooks per row with the largest hooks being 24 to 28 mm long. The lemnisci are 10.0 mm. In the male, the testes are 2.50 to 3.0 mm by 0.80 mm and there are eight cement glands. The eggs are oval being 0.12 to 0.12 mm long by 0.07 to 0.07 mm wide. It is named after Lauro Travassos, a Brazilian helminthologist and entomologist who named the genus Moniliformis to which this species belongs.

- Moniliformis tupaia Chen, Yu, Ma, Zhao, Cao and Li, 2024

== Hosts ==
Life cycle of Acanthocephala.

The life cycle of an acanthocephalan consists of three stages beginning when an infective acanthor (development of an egg) is released from the intestines of the definitive host and then ingested by an arthropod, the intermediate host. The intermediate hosts of Moniliformis are usually insects. When the acanthor molts, the second stage called the acanthella begins. This stage involves penetrating the wall of the mesenteron or the intestine of the intermediate host and growing. The final stage is the infective cystacanth which is the larval or juvenile state of an Acanthocephalan, differing from the adult only in size and stage of sexual development. The cystacanths within the intermediate hosts are consumed by the definitive host, usually attaching to the walls of the intestines, and as adults they reproduce sexually in the intestines. The acanthor are passed in the feces of the definitive host and the cycle repeats. There are no known paratenic hosts (hosts where parasites infest but do not undergo larval development or sexual reproduction) for Moniliformis.

Moniliformidae species are found in the intestines parasitizing mammals and occasionally birds. Intermediate hosts are mostly cockroaches but also other insect groups. Infestation can cause moniliformiasis, which is characterized as lesions in the intestines, intestinal distension, perforated ulcers, enteritis, crypt hypertrophy, goblet cell hyperplasia, and occlusions of the intestinal tract in the gray squirrel (Sciurus carolinensis). There are multiple reports of human infection from Australia, Iran, Iraq, Nigeria, Zimbabwe, Saudi Arabia and United States, all from Moniliformis moniliformis.

Hosts for Moniliformidae species

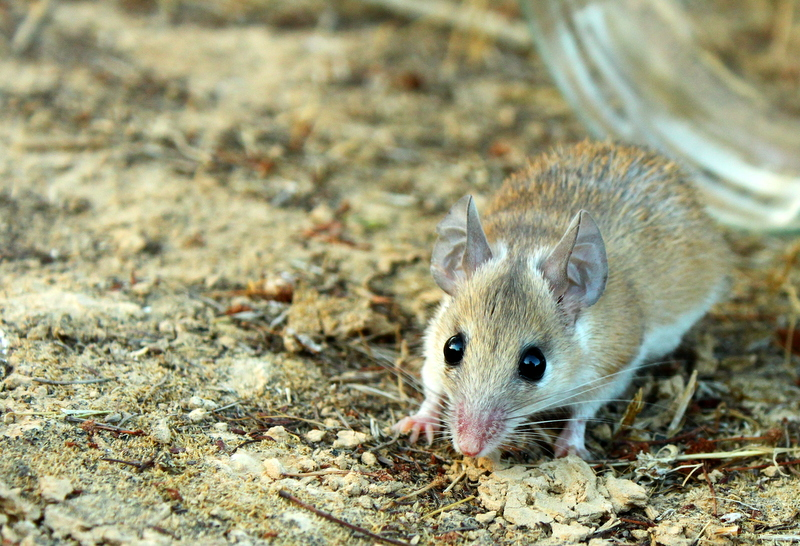
The Cairo spiny mouse is a host of Moniliformis acomysi

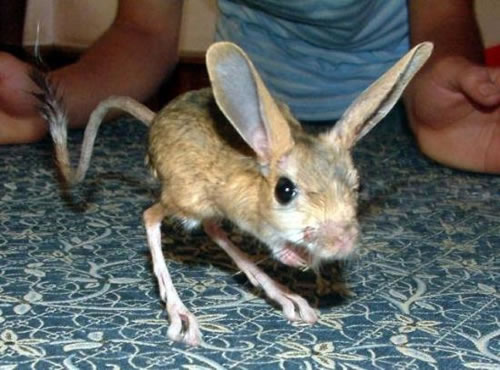
The four-toed jerboa is a host of Moniliformis aegyptiacus

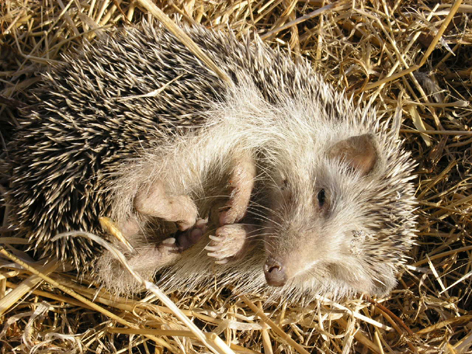
The North African hedgehog is a host of Moniliformis aegyptiacus

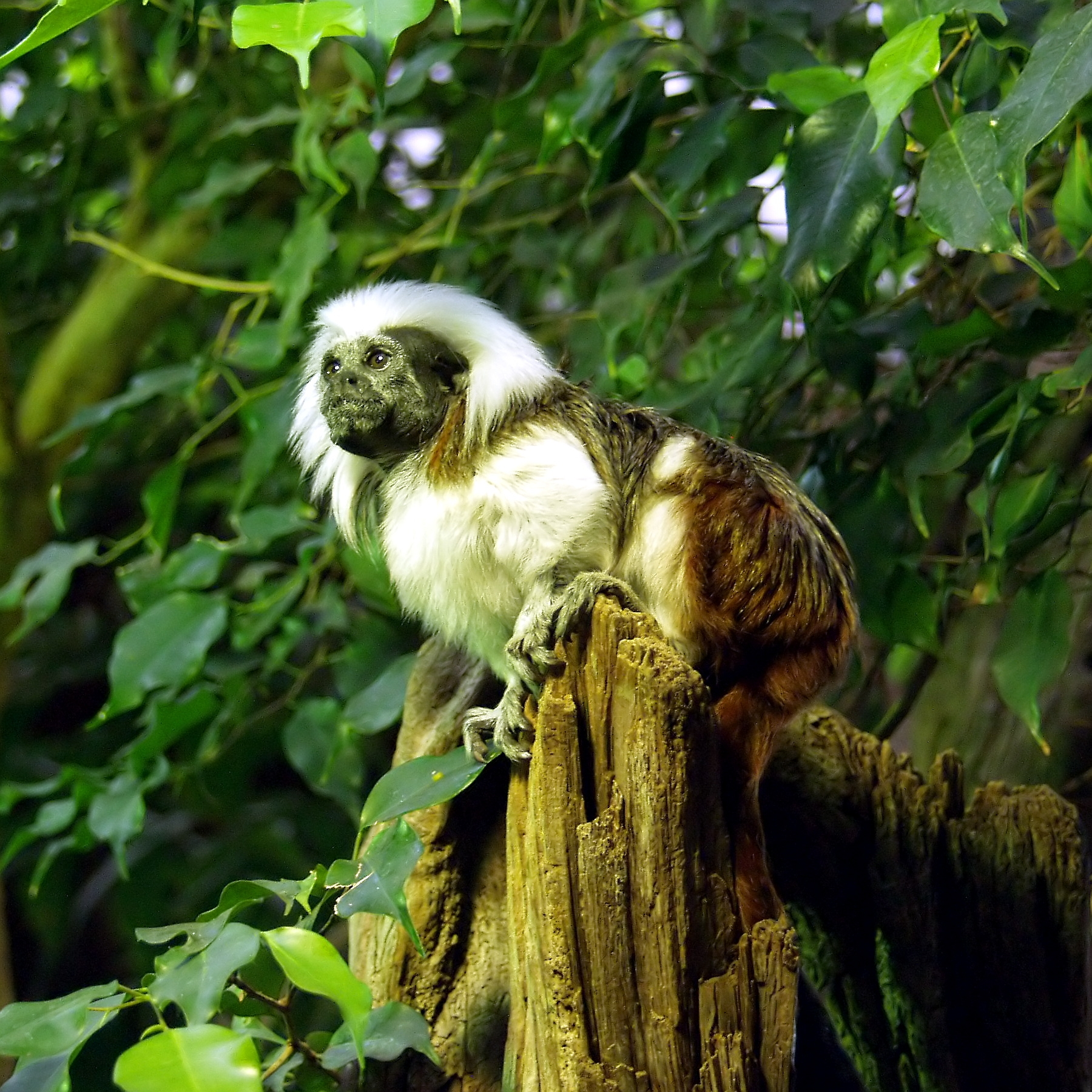
The cotton-top tamarins is a host of Moniliformis clarki

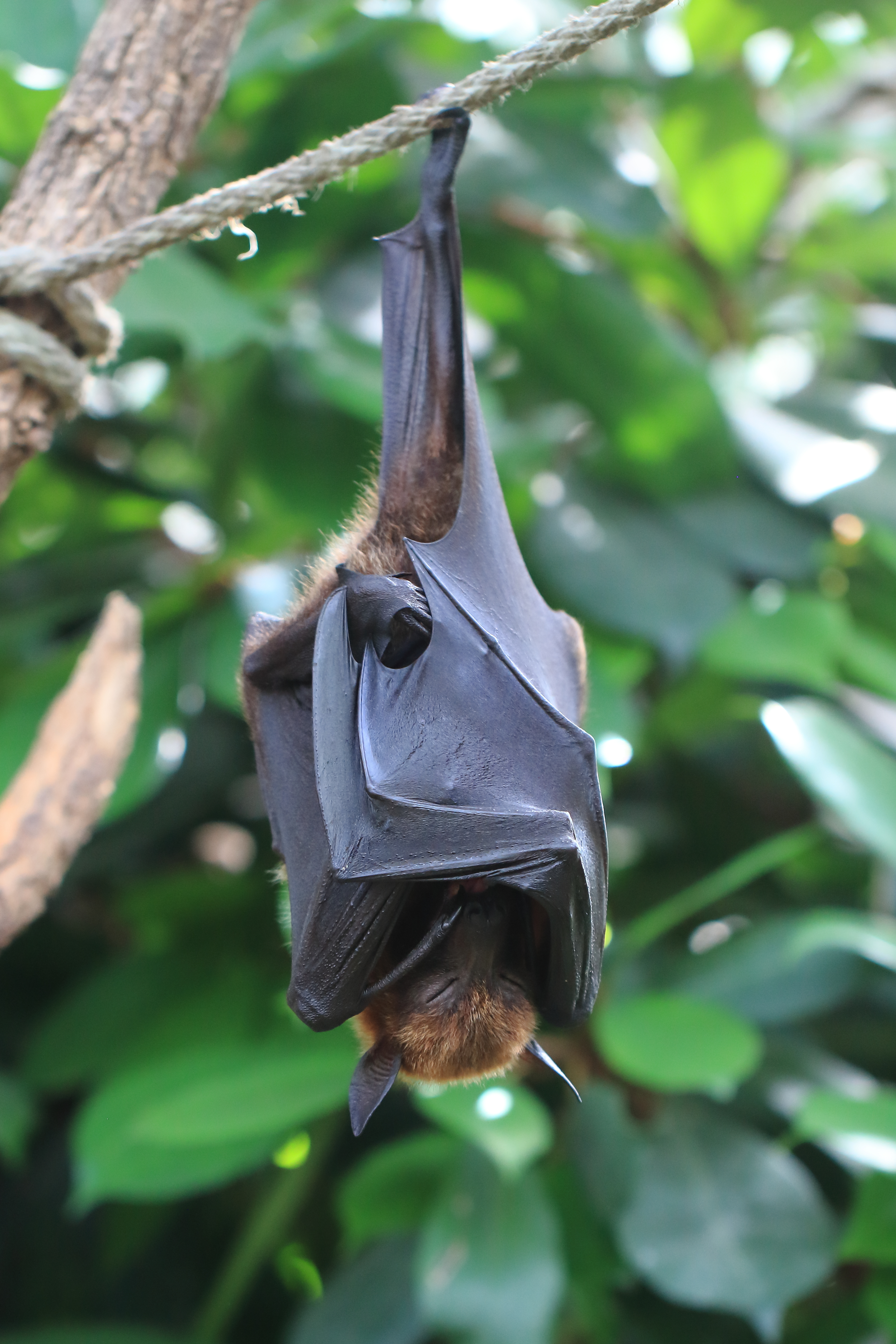
The large flying fox is a host of Moniliformis convolutus

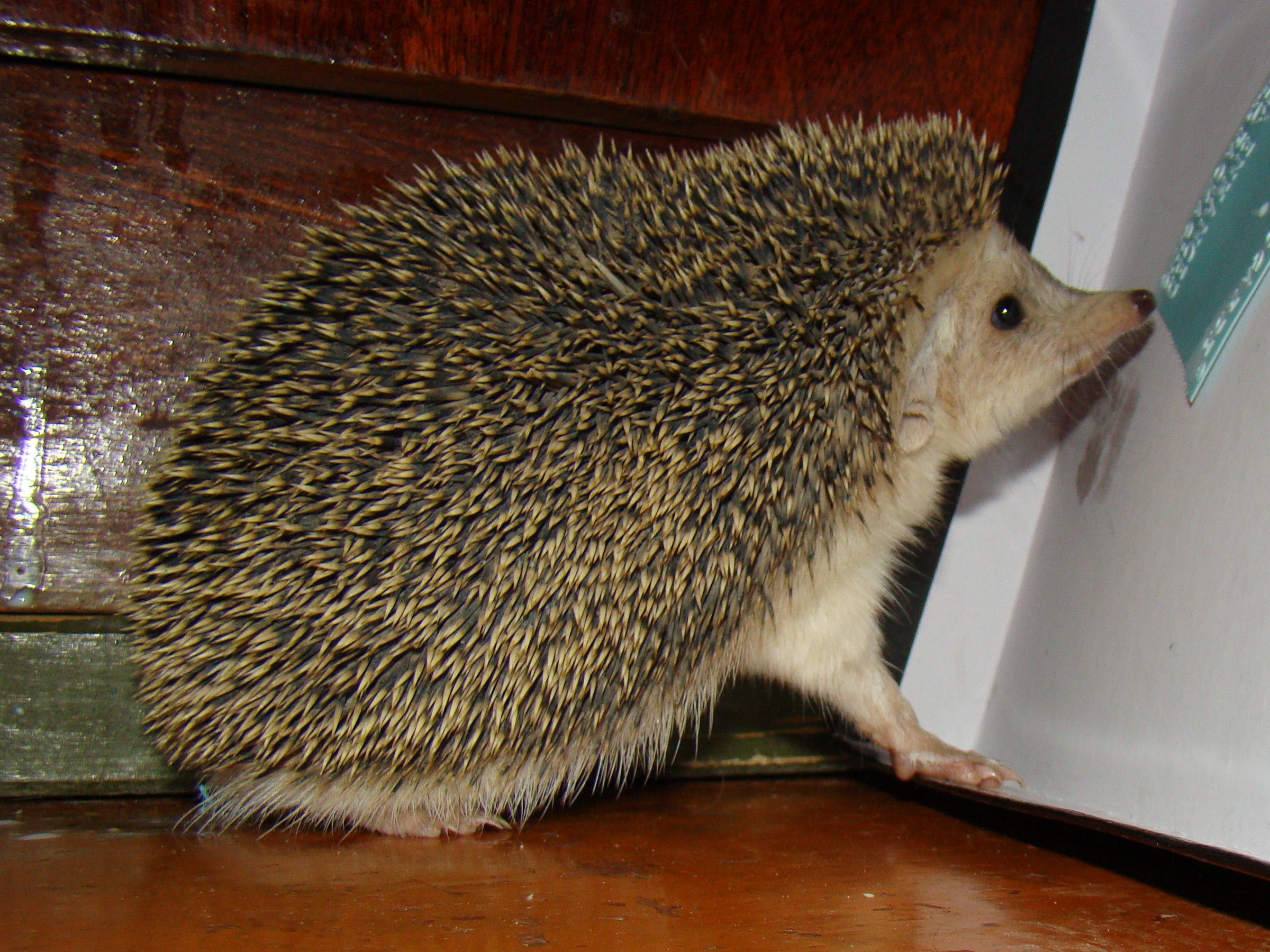
The long-eared hedgehog is a host of Moniliformis cryptosaudi

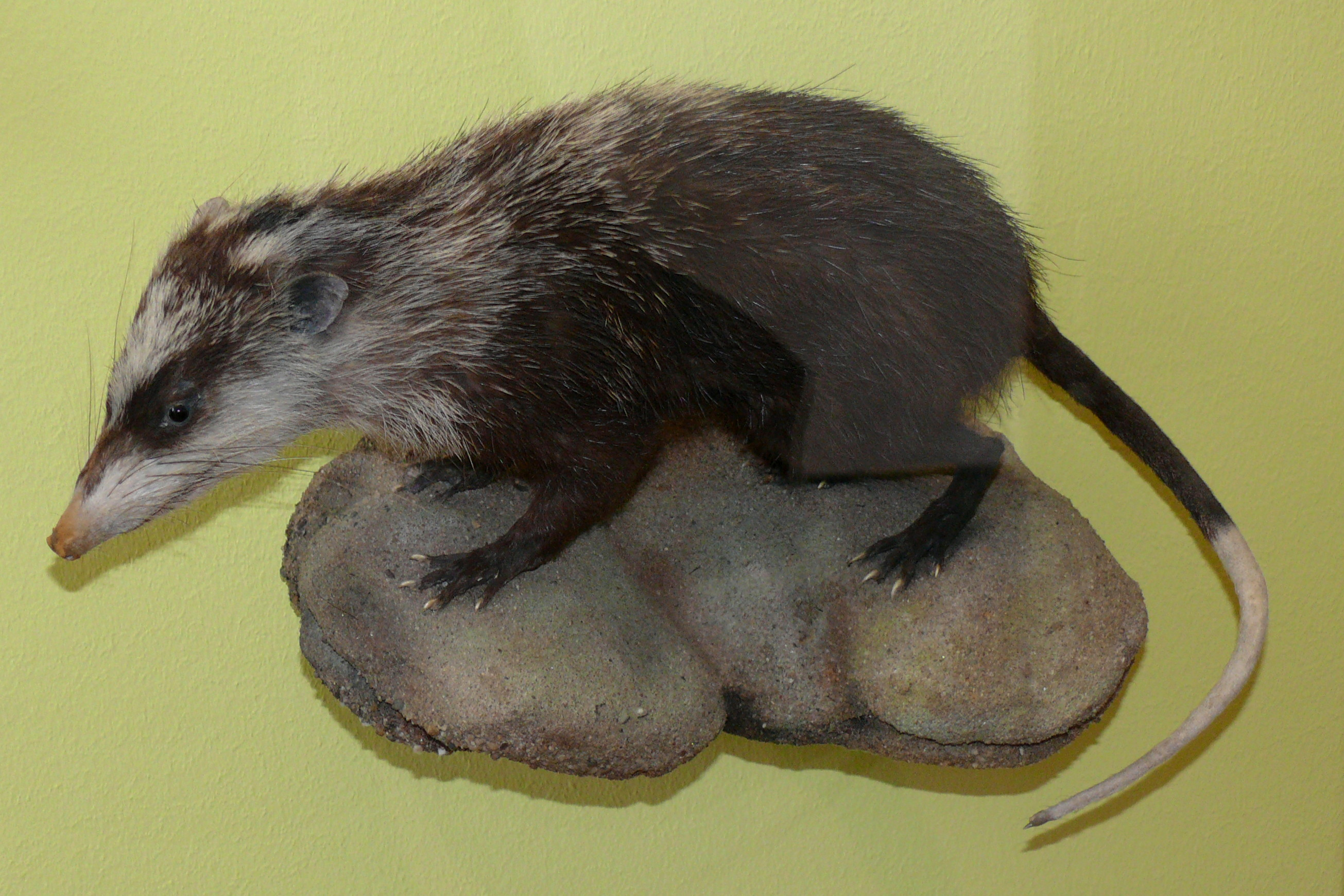
The moonrat is a host of Moniliformis echinosorexi

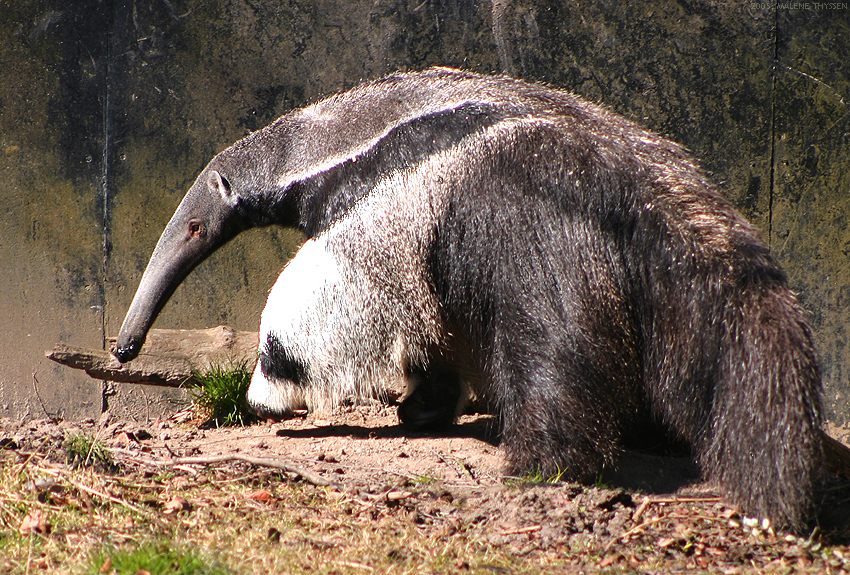
The giant anteater is a host of Moniliformis monoechinus

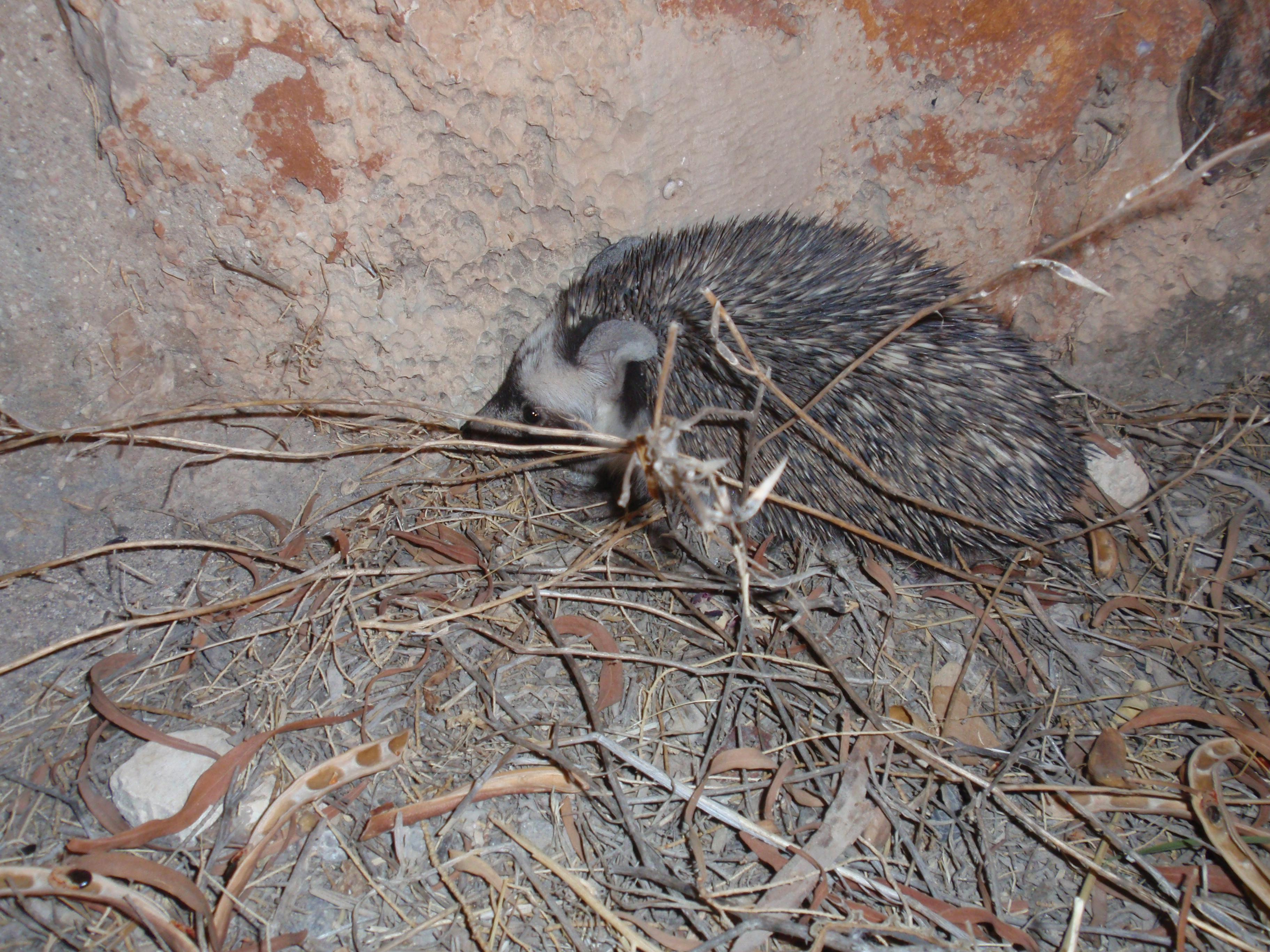
The desert hedgehog is a host of Moniliformis saudi

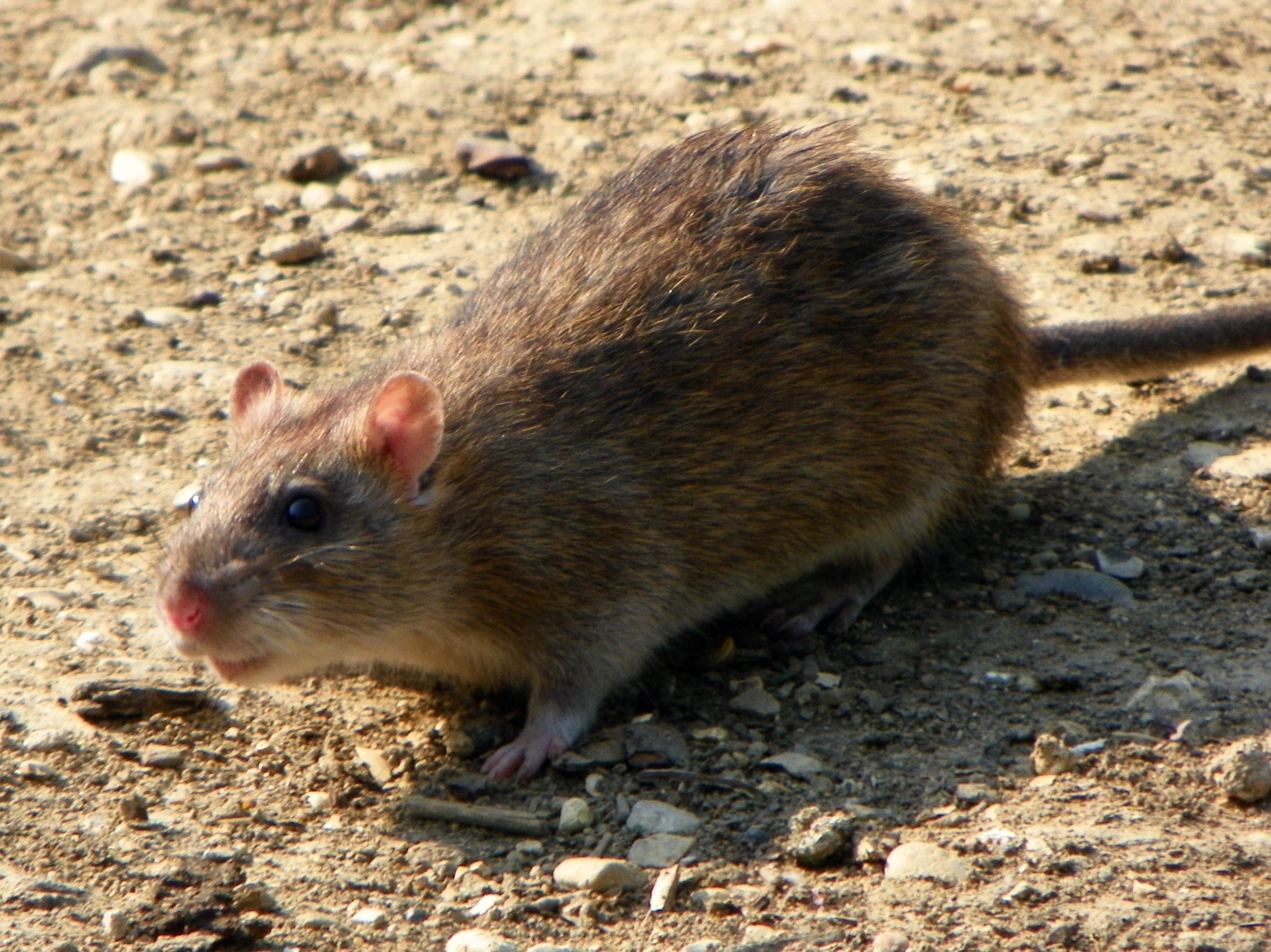
The brown rat is a host of M. siciliensis and Moniliformis travassosi

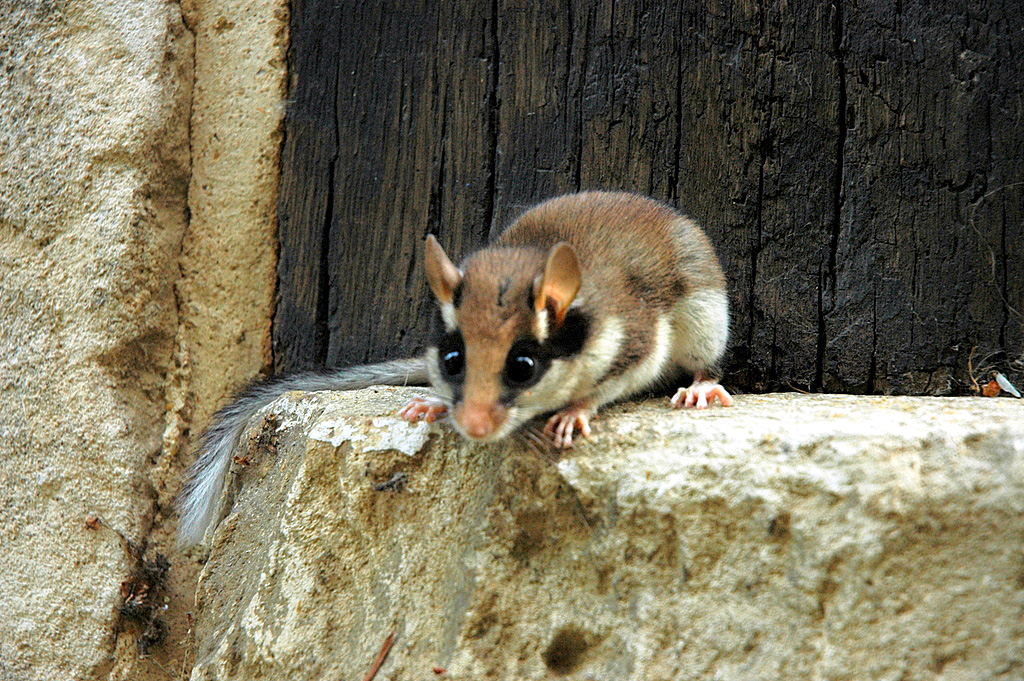
The garden dormouse is a host of M. siciliensis

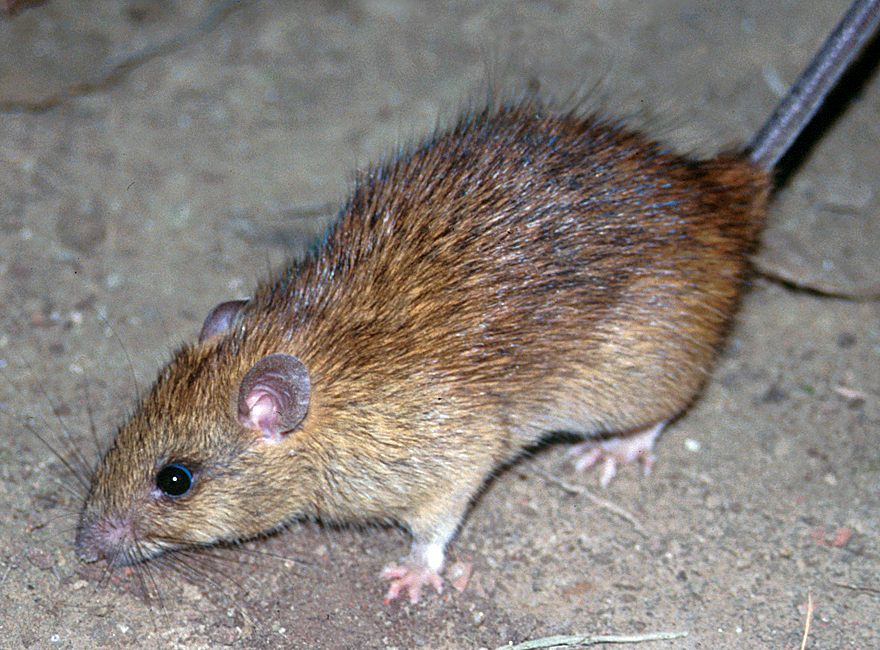
The black rat is a host of Moniliformis spiralis

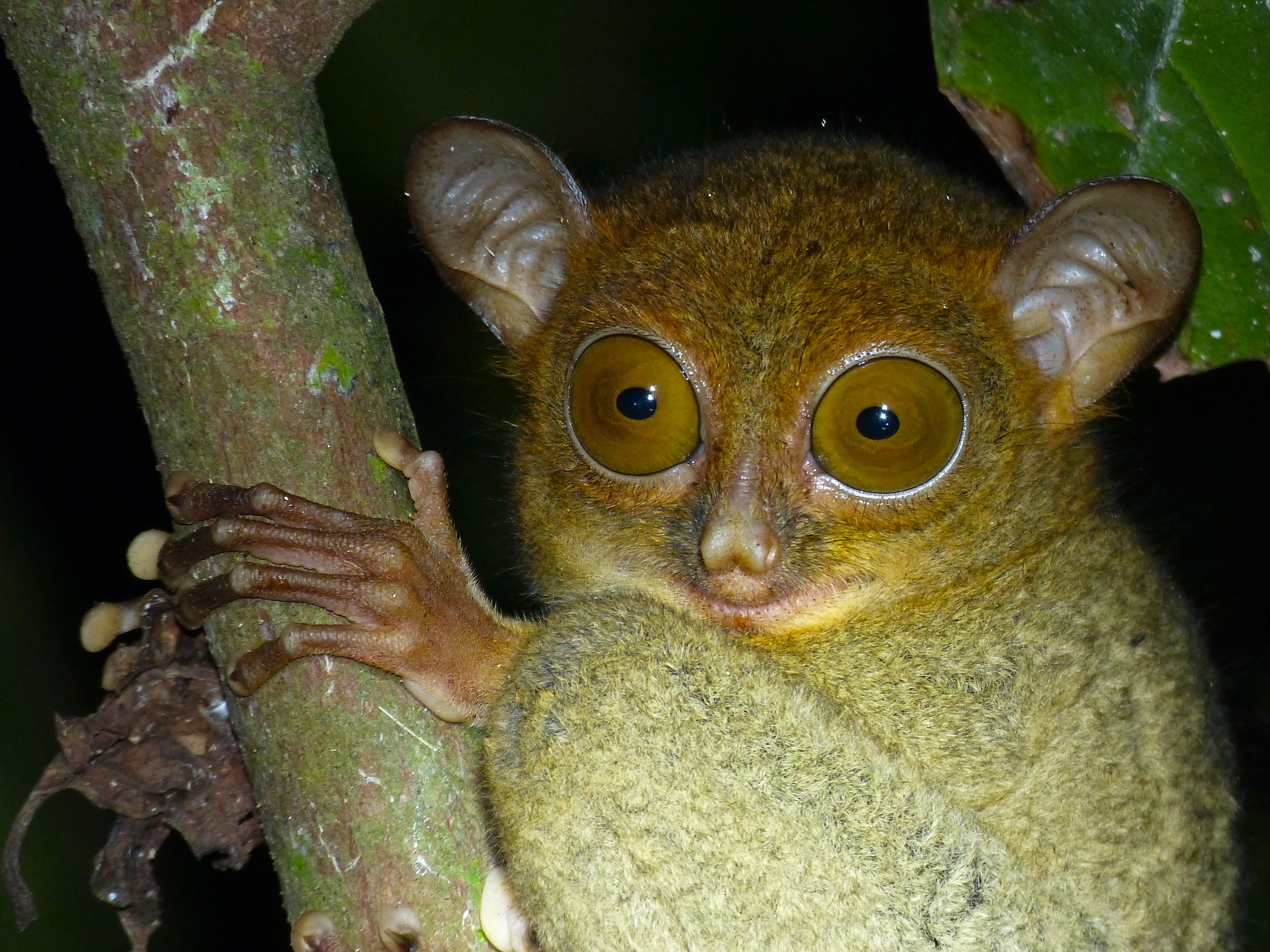
The Horsfield's tarsier is a host of Moniliformis tarsii
