= Palliolisentis =

Scientific classification
- Kingdom: Animalia
- Phylum: Acanthocephala
- Class: Eoacanthocephala
- Order: Gyracanthocephala
- Family: Quadrigyridae
- Subfamily: Pallisentinae
- Genus: Palliolisentis; Machado-Filho, 1960

Type species
- Palliolisentis quinqueungulis Machado-Filho, 1960

Other species
- Palliolisentis ornatus; Palliolisentis polyonca; Palliolisentis quinqueungulis

Genus of worms

Palliolisentis is a genus in Acanthocephala (parasitic thorny-headed worms, also known as spiny-headed worms).

== Taxonomy ==
The type species is Palliolisentis quinqueungulis. The National Center for Biotechnology Information does not indicate that any phylogenetic analysis has been published on Palliolisentis that would confirm its position as a unique order in the family Quadrigyridae.

== Description ==
Palliolisentis has a cylindrical Proboscis armed with 6–12 longitudinal rows of hooks and a trunk with single field of spines.

== Species ==
The genus Palliolisentis Machado-Filho, 1960 contains three species:

Name (Note: A binomial authority in parentheses indicates that the species was originally described in a genus other than Apororhynchus.)	Taxonomy	Host(s) and range	Diagnostic features
Palliolisentis ornatus Machado-Filho, 1960			
Palliolisentis polyonca Schmidt and Hugghins, 1973			
Palliolisentis quinqueungulis Machado-Filho, 1960	It is the type species.		

== Distribution ==
The distribution of Palliolisentis species is determined by that of its hosts.

== Hosts ==
Life cycle of Acanthocephala. (Note: There are no known aberrant human infections for Palliolisentis species.)

The life cycle of an acanthocephalan consists of three stages beginning when an infective acanthor (development of an egg) is released from the intestines of the definitive host and then ingested by an arthropod, the intermediate host. The intermediate hosts of most Palliolisentis species are not known. When the acanthor molts, the second stage called the acanthella begins. This stage involves penetrating the wall of the mesenteron or the intestine of the intermediate host and growing. The final stage is the infective cystacanth which is the larval or juvenile state of an Acanthocephalan, differing from the adult only in size and stage of sexual development. The cystacanths within the intermediate hosts are consumed by the definitive host, usually attaching to the walls of the intestines, and as adults they reproduce sexually in the intestines. The acanthor are passed in the feces of the definitive host and the cycle repeats.

There are no reported cases of any Palliolisentis species infesting humans in the English language medical literature.
