= Raosentis =

Scientific classification
- Kingdom: Animalia
- Phylum: Acanthocephala
- Class: Eoacanthocephala
- Order: Gyracanthocephala
- Family: Quadrigyridae
- Subfamily: Pallisentinae
- Genus: Raosentis; Datta, 1947

Genus of worms

Raosentis is a genus of Acanthocephala (thorny-headed worms, also known as spiny-headed worms) that parasitize the intestine of fish.

== Taxonomy ==
The National Center for Biotechnology Information does not indicate that any phylogenetic analysis has been published on Raosentis that would confirm its position as a unique order in the family Quadrigyridae.

== Description ==
The genus Raosentis is characterized by the trunk spines are restricted to anterior region only (not divided into two separate regions). The anterior trunk has 16-17 circles of spines and 4 circles of proboscis hooks with anterior two circles larger than posterior two circles; and a spineless space between 2nd and 3rd circles. Species in the genus have a small fusiform body with small hypodermic nuclei arranged in 4 or 5 pairs dorsally and 1 or 2 ventrally. The proboscis is globular to elongate with four circles of proboscis hooks, anterior two circles of hooks longer and shorter than posterior two circles with hookless free space in between. The proboscis sheath is single layered with ganglion at base. The Anterior trunk has 16-17 circles of rose-thorn spines. Testes contiguous, tandem, and near the posterior extremity. Cement gland syncytial with 8-10 nuclei. Vagina has two sphincters. Eggs are small and elliptical. Species are distinguished by 1. Ratio of size of proboscis hooks.

Female measurements (mm)
Measurements	R. cavasii	R. dattai	R. godavarensis	R. ivaniosi	R. podderi	R. thapari
Length of proboscis						
Width of proboscis						
Length of proboscis receptacle						
Width of proboscis receptacle						
Length of trunk		1.54-2.74		2.0-7.0		
Width of trunk		0.45-0.90		0.85-2.0		
Length of small rootless spines						
Length of lemnisci						
Size of eggs		0.040-0.045 x 0.02-0.022		0.040-0.060 x 0.020-0.030		0.039-0.04 x 0.02-0.022
Male measurements (mm)
Length of proboscis						
Width of proboscis						
Length of proboscis receptacle						
Width of proboscis receptacle						
Length of trunk				1.5-5.0		
Width of trunk				0.3-0.67		
Length of small rootless spines						
Length of lemnisci						
Size of anterior testis						
Size of posterior testis						
Size of cement glands		0.21-0.25 x 0.18-0.20		0.120-0.200 x 0.200-0.250	0.32-0.52 × 0.16-0.35	0.28–0.33 × 0.13–0.20

== Species ==
There are six valid species in the genus Raosentis.

- Raosentis cavasii Gupta 2021

Found infesting Mystus cavasius and named after the host of the species cavasius.

- Raosentis dattai Gupta and Fatma, 1986

R. dattai was found infesting the intestine of the Eutropiichthys vacha in the Gomti River in Lucknow. Male has a small body small with hypodermic nuclei 4-5 pairs dorsally and 2-3 pairs ventrally, 2.68 x 0.7 Proboscis 0.24 x 0.18.· armed with 4 circles of hooks arranged in 6,6,8,8 per row. 1st circle of hooks 0.060-0.065; 2nd 0.055-0.058; 3rd 0.020-0.025. Proboscis sheath 0.61 x 0.15. L/I--O.70 x 0.10; L/2--O.75 x 0.08. Anterior trunk spines extending up to anterior testes. T /1--0.34 x 0.32; T /2--0.32 x 0.28. Eggs are oval.

- Raosentis godavarensis Vankara and Vijayalakshmi, 2009

Found infesting the striped dwarf catfish (Mystus vittatus) and named after the river it was found Godavari.

- Raosentis ivaniosi George and Nadakal, 1978

R. ivaniosi was found infesting the small intestine of the Flatmouth sea catfish (Arius platystomus) in Veli Lake, Puvar and Vellayani, Kerala. Proboscis 0.110-0.160 x 0.040-0.075, armed with 4 circles of 8-10 hooks each, 1st and 2nd circles larger and stouter than 3rd and 4th circle s, larger hooks of 1st circle 0.060-0.090 x 0.004-0.008; 2nd 0.050-0.058 x 0.004-0.007; 3rd 0.030-0.046 x 0.003-0.005; 4th 0.024-0.035 x 0.002-0.005; roots of 1st and 2nd circles of hooks 0.016-0.018. L/1-O.370-0.380 x 0.020-0.040; L/2-D.300-0.350. Proboscis sac 0.180-0.200; T /1-0.200-0.260 x 0.175-0.250; T /2-D.300-0.350 x 0.200-0.300.

- Raosentis podderi Datta, 1947

It is the first species to be described in the genus Raosentis and is the type species. It was found infesting the small intestine of Mystus cavassius and intestine of the striped dwarf catfish (Mystus vittatus) in river Godavari. Body 1.70–2.76 × 0.37–0.47; proboscis 0.32–0.42 × 0.07–0.075; large hooks 0.66; smaller hooks 0.01; leminsci 0.38–0.42 × 0.04–0.07; testes 0.25-0.28 × 0.20–0.24; cement reservoir 0.15–0.23 × 0.12–0.16 and eggs 0.04-0.05 × 0.02–0.022. Original description from Datta (1947 ) : Male: Body 0.67-2.37. Proboscis hooks 6 in 1st and 2nd circle; 7 in 3rd and 4th circle. hypodermal nuclei 2 dorsal and 1 ventral. anterior trunk spines in 16-17 circles. Cement gland cyncytial with 8-10 nuclei Female: Body 1.31-2.53. Two tubular vagina. Eggs 0.050 x 0.020.

- Raosentis thapari Rai, 1967

'R. thapari distinguished from R. podderi mainly on the number of hypodermic nuclei on dorsal and ventral trunk. It was found infesting the small intestine of the striped dwarf catfish (Mystus vittatus) in river Godavari (Gorakhpur. Mathura) and the freshwater Zig-zag eel (Mastacembelus armatus). Body 1.18–1.58 × 0.27–0.32; proboscis 0.28–0.32 × 0.07– 0.21; larger hooks 0.06; smaller posterior hooks 0.01–0.02; leminsci 0.30-0.38 × 0.09–0.10; testes 0.15–0.27 × 0.13– 0.18; cement reservoir 0.11–0.16 × 0.09–0.15; eggs 0.03-0.04 × 0.02–0.022. Egg length also given as 39.5 with an elongation ratio of 1.88. Older measurements from Rai (1967) found the male with a Body size of 1.7-2.37 x 0.57-0.68. Proboscis 0.14-0.24 x 0.11-0.16, armed with 4 circles, anterior two circles with 6 hooks each, while, posterior two circles with 8 hooks each, non-spined area between 2nd and 3rd circles 0.058-0.078. 1st circle of hooks 0.085; 2nd 0.058; 3rd 0.028; 4th 0.020. Trunk spines anterior with 9 rows of 25-30 each. Proboscis sac 0.39-0.56 x 0.097-0.11, ganglion at base. Lemnisci equal, 0.55 x 0.075, hypodermic nuclei dorsally and ventrally 3 pairs. T /1-0.25-0.27 x 0.27-0.5. T /2- 0.26-0.33 x 0.31-0.35.

== Hosts ==
Life cycle of Acanthocephala.

The life cycle of an acanthocephalan consists of three stages beginning when an infective acanthor (development of an egg) is released from the intestines of the definitive host and then ingested by an arthropod, the intermediate host. Although the intermediate hosts of Gyracanthocephala are not known, the order Gyracanthocephala often has Crustaceans as the intermediate host. When the acanthor molts, the second stage called the acanthella begins. This stage involves penetrating the wall of the mesenteron or the intestine of the intermediate host and growing. The final stage is the infective cystacanth which is the larval or juvenile state of an Acanthocephalan, differing from the adult only in size and stage of sexual development. The cystacanths within the intermediate hosts are consumed by the definitive host, usually attaching to the walls of the intestines, and as adults they reproduce sexually in the intestines. The acanthor are passed in the feces of the definitive host and the cycle repeats. Although paratenic hosts (hosts where parasites infest but do not undergo larval development or sexual reproduction) are found in the order Gyracanthocephala, none have been described for Raosentis species.

Raosentis species infest fish.

Hosts for Raosentis species

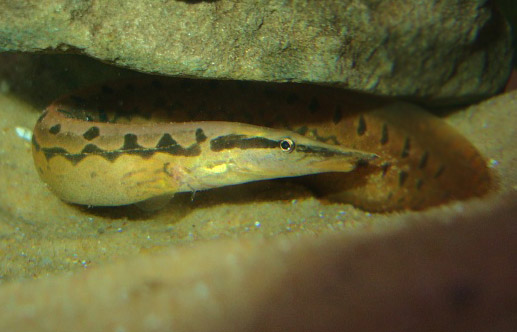
The Zig-zag eel is a host for R. thapari
