= Iridescent toothcarp =

Conservation status
- Least Concern (IUCN 3.1)

Scientific classification
- Kingdom: Animalia
- Phylum: Chordata
- Class: Actinopterygii
- Division: Teleostei
- Order: Cyprinodontiformes
- Family: Aphaniidae
- Genus: Paraphanius
- Species: P. mento

Binomial name
- Paraphanius mento (Heckel, 1843)

Synonyms
- Aphanius cypris (Heckel, 1843); Aphanius cypris guentheri Özarslan, 1958; Aphanius guentheri Özarslan, 1958; Aphanius mento (Heckel, 1843); Cyprinodon cypris (Heckel, 1843); Cyprinodon mento (Heckel, 1843); Lebias cypris Heckel, 1843; Lebias mento Heckel, 1843

Species of fish

The iridescent toothcarp or pearl-spotted killifish(Paraphanius mento) is a species of killifish in the family Aphaniidae. It can be found in Western Asia (Iraq, Israel, Jordan, Lebanon, Palestine, Syria and Turkey). It occurs in a wide range of freshwater habitats (springs, streams, lakes and rivers). It grows to 5 cm (2.0 in) total length. This species was described in 1843 as Lebias mento by Johann Jakob Heckel with the type locality given as Mosul in Iraq. The acanthocephalan parasite Triaspiron aphanii was found to infest 90% of a sample of Iridescent toothcarp, with infestations ranging from 1 to 15 worms.
