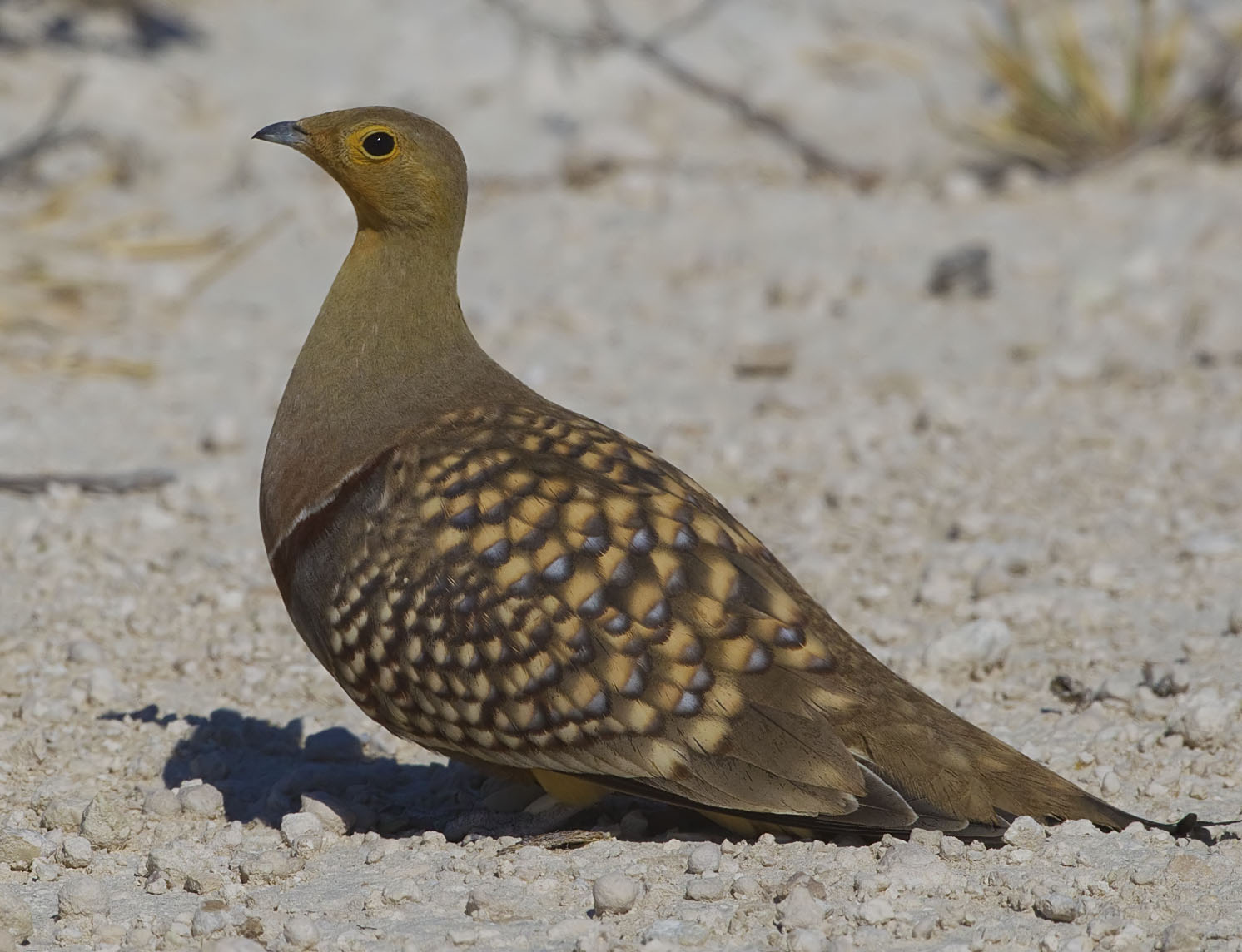
- Male
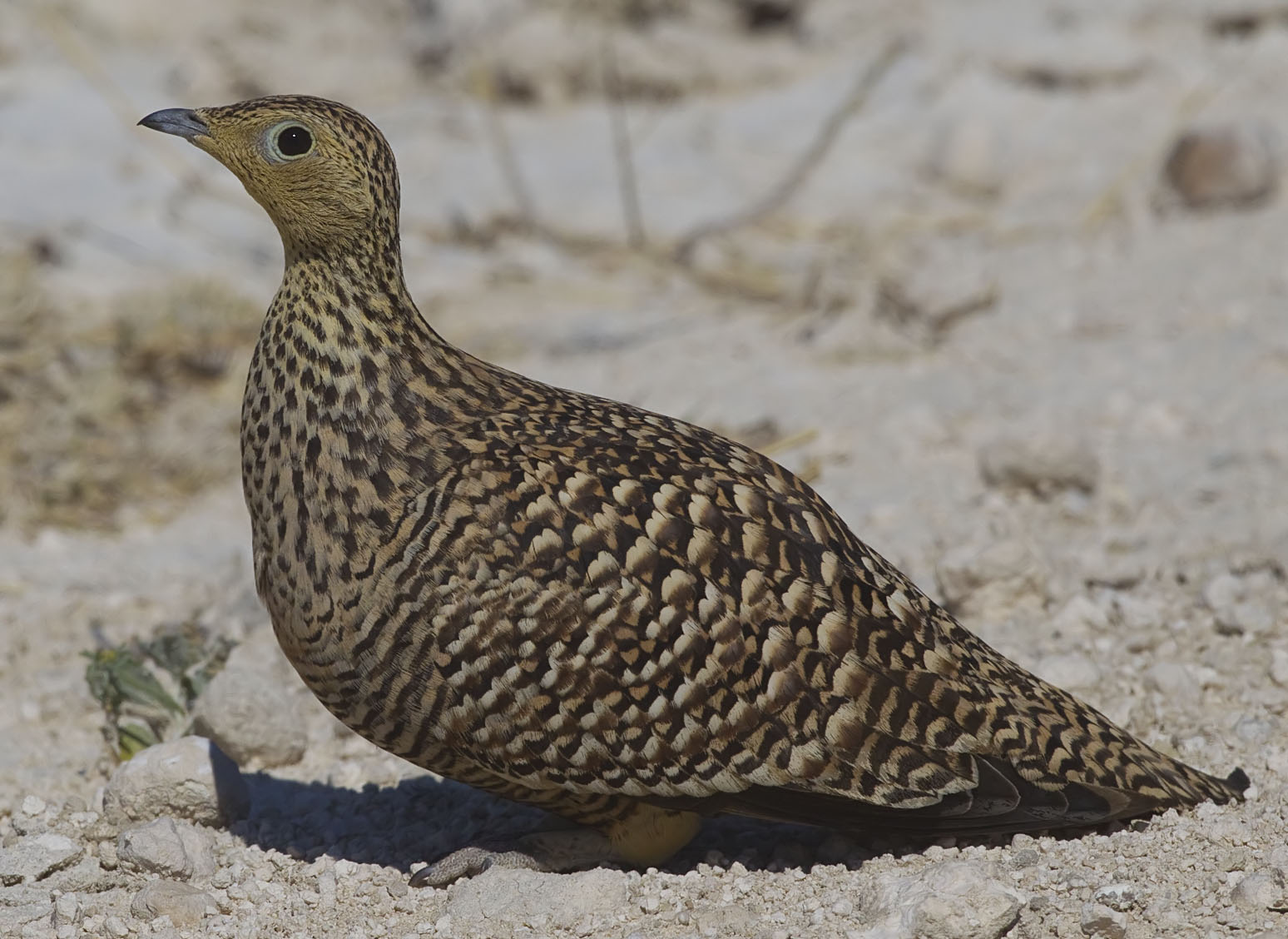
- Female

Conservation status
- Least Concern (IUCN 3.1)

Scientific classification
- Kingdom: Animalia
- Phylum: Chordata
- Class: Aves
- Order: Pterocliformes
- Family: Pteroclidae
- Genus: Pterocles
- Species: P. namaqua

Binomial name
- Pterocles namaqua (Gmelin, JF, 1789)
- Extant (resident), IUCN data

= Namaqua sandgrouse =

Species of bird

The Namaqua sandgrouse (Pterocles namaqua), is a species of ground-dwelling bird in the sandgrouse family. It is found in arid regions of south-western Africa.

== Taxonomy ==
The Namaqua sandgrouse was formally described in 1789 by the German naturalist Johann Friedrich Gmelin in his revised and expanded edition of Carl Linnaeus's Systema Naturae. He placed it with all the grouse like birds in the genus Tetrao and coined the binomial name Tetrao namaqua. Gmelin based his description on the "Namaqua grous" that had been described in 1783 by the English ornithologist John Latham in his A General Synopsis of Birds. The Namaqua sandgrouse is now placed with 13 other species in genus Pterocles that was introduced in 1815 by the Dutch zoologist Coenraad Jacob Temminck. The genus name combines the Ancient Greek pteron meaning "wing" with -klēs meaning "notable" or "splendid". The specific epithet namaqua is from Namaqualand, a region in Namibia and South Africa, the type locality. The species is monotypic: no subspecies are recognised.

== Description ==
The sandgrouse is a medium-sized bird with a plump body, small head and short legs. It grows to a length of about 28 centimetres (11 in). The male has an orangish buff head, throat and chest delineated by a conspicuous narrow band of white and dark brown. The back and wings are mottled brown with large white specks and there are two long black filaments extending from the olive-brown tail. The colouring of the female and juvenile is more cryptic being generally various shades of brown patterned with white specks. It could be confused with the double-banded sandgrouse (Pterocles bicinctus) and Burchell's sandgrouse (Pterocles burchelli), which share the same range.

== Distribution and habitat ==
The Namaqua sandgrouse can be found in various arid parts of South Africa and its neighbouring lands. It is common in the Kalahari Desert, the Nama Karoo (in central and western South Africa), and in parts of the Western Cape. In addition, it is also found in Namibia (especially in the Namib Desert), Zimbabwe, Botswana and Angola.

It favours deserts and other arid areas. In order to survive, this bird needs only seeds, some gravel, and easy access to some sort of fresh water source. Their habitat usually has rough vegetation and tussock-type grasses.

== Behaviour ==
Outside the breeding season, the sandgrouse are gregarious. The birds converge on watering holes in the early morning and several dozens or even hundreds of individuals may congregate in one place. They also tend to spend the night in groups, congregating about an hour before dusk. They split up during the day into much smaller groups to feed.

=== Feeding ===
Their principal diet is seeds but they also eat leaves, flowers, small fruit, insects and molluscs. They forage by exploring loose soil with their beaks and flicking it away sideways.

=== Breeding ===
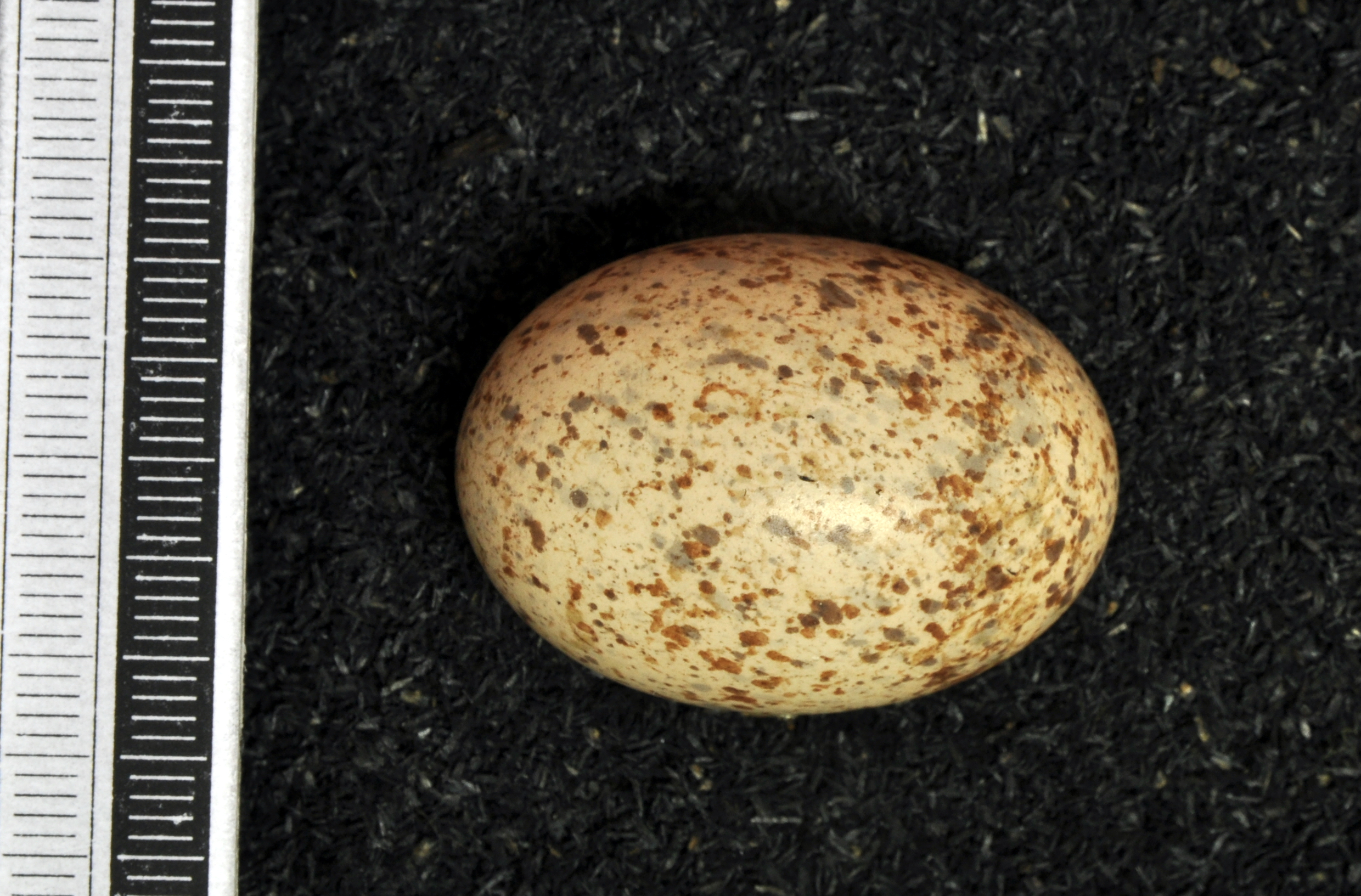
Egg, Collection Museum Wiesbaden

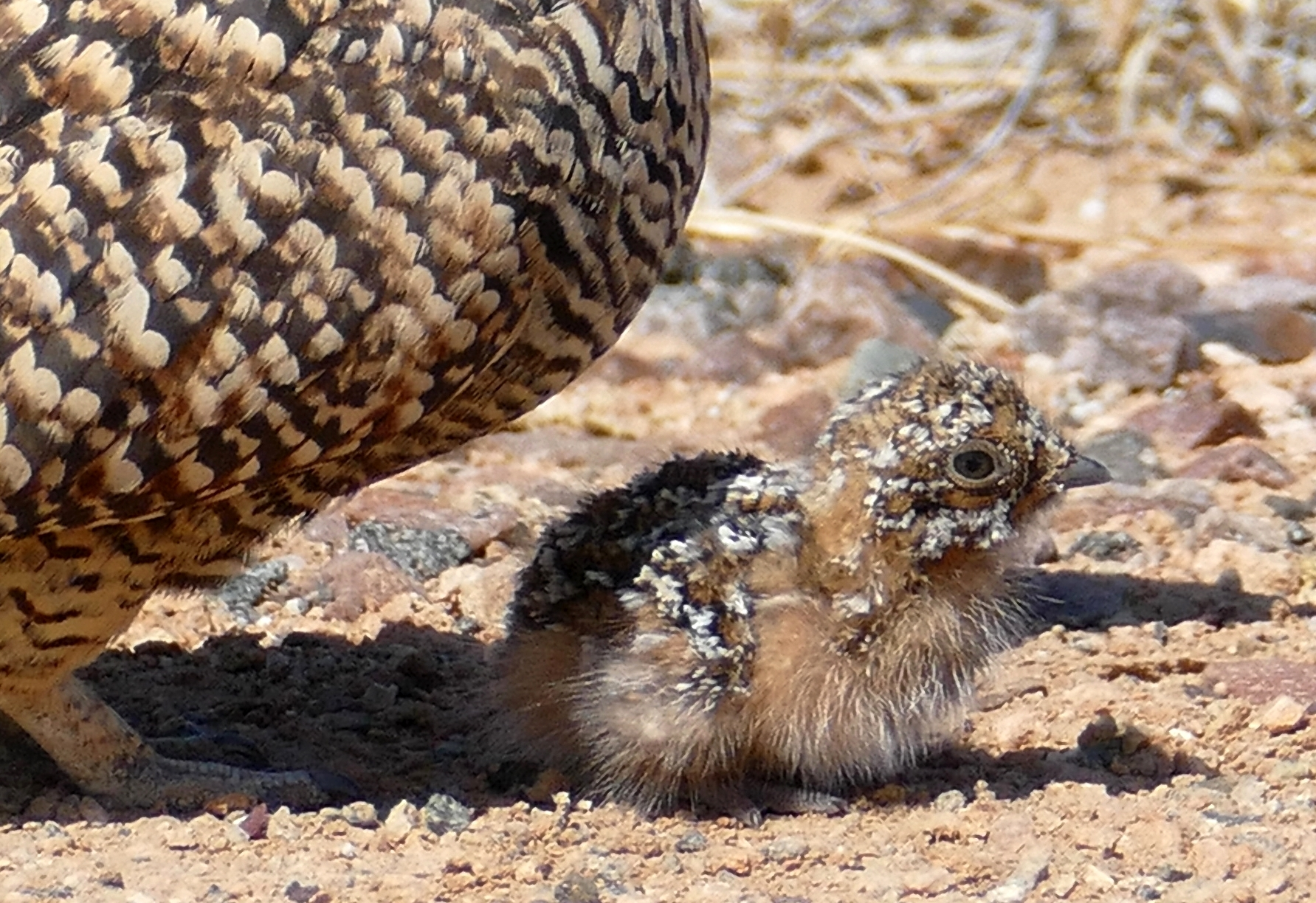
Chick being guarded by a female bird

Breeding takes place at any time of the year and is dependent on rainfall. Usually the nests are solitary but sometimes several pairs of birds choose sites near each other. The nest is a scrape in the earth, scantily lined with dried plant material. Two or three pinkish-grey eggs with brown markings are laid over the course of a few days. Incubation starts after the last egg has been laid and lasts about 22 days. The female does the incubation by day and the male does a longer shift at night, starting about two hours before sunset and finishing two hours after dawn. The chicks are precocial and able to leave the nest on the day they are hatched. The male brings them water absorbed on the specially adapted feathers of his breast. The chicks grow rapidly; they are fully feathered at three weeks and able to fly at six.

== Status and threats ==
The species is common within its range and is considered to be of Least Concern by the IUCN Red List of Threatened Species. The birds are at risk of predation by mongooses while they are young. Sheep farmers kill birds of prey and jackals to protect their flocks and this may have resulted in an increase in the mongoose population and consequently a diminution in the number of sandgrouse chicks that survive. Other predators that prey on the Namaqua sandgrouse include the booted eagle (Aquila pennatus), the tawny eagle (Aquila rapax), the lanner falcon (Falco biarmicus) and the peregrine falcon (Falco peregrinus). The Namaqua sandgrouse is a host of the Acanthocephalan intestinal parasite Moniliformis kalahariensis.
