= Acanthogyrus =

Scientific classification
- Kingdom: Animalia
- Phylum: Acanthocephala
- Class: Eoacanthocephala
- Order: Gyracanthocephala
- Family: Quadrigyridae
- Subfamily: Pallisentinae
- Genus: Acanthogyrus; Thapar, 1927

Genus of worms

Acanthogyrus is a genus of parasitic worms belonging to the family Quadrigyridae. The species of this genus are found in Africa.

== Taxonomy ==
Golvan in 1959 divided the genus Acanthogyrus into two subgenera: Acanthogyrus and Acanthosentis based on the number of proboscis hooks; there are 18 (3 circles of 6 hooks each) in Acanthosentis and 24 (3 circles of 8 hooks each) in Acanthogyrus.

== Description ==
There are between 18 and 24 hooks on the proboscis.

== Species ==
There are many species in the genus Acanthogyrus. (Note: A binomial authority in parentheses indicates that the species was originally described in a genus other than the present genus.)

Acanthogyrus (Acanthogyrus) Thapar, 1927

- Acanthogyrus acanthogyrus Thapar, 1927

Found in the intestine of a rohu (Labeo rohita) in Lucknow, and from the intestines of a catla (Catla catla) from Kolkata, both in India.

- Acanthogyrus tripathi Rai, 1967

Acanthogyrus (Acanthosentis) Verma and Datta, 1929

- Acanthogyrus acanthuri (Cable and Quick, 1954)
- Acanthogyrus adriaticus Amin, 2005
- Acanthogyrus alternatspinus Amin, 2005
- Acanthogyrus anguillae (Wang, 1981)
- Acanthogyrus antespinus (Verma and Datta, 1929)
- Acanthogyrus arii (Bilqees, 1971)
- Acanthogyrus bacailai (Verma, 1973)
- Acanthogyrus barmeshoori Amin, Gholami, Akhlaghi and Heckmann, 2013

A. barmeshoori was found infesting the Farsi toothcarp (Aphanius farsicus) in Maharloo Lake, Fars province, Iran.

- Acanthogyrus betwai (Tripathi, 1956)
- Acanthogyrus bilaspurensis (Chowhan, Gupta and Khera, 1987)
- Acanthogyrus cameroni (Gupta and Kajaji, 1969)
- Acanthogyrus cheni Amin, 2005
- Acanthogyrus dattai (Podder, 1938)
- Acanthogyrus giuris (Soota and Sen, 1956)
- Acanthogyrus gobindi (Chowhan, Gupta and Khera, 1987)
- Acanthogyrus golvani (Gupta and Jain, 1980)
- Acanthogyrus heterospinus (Khan and Bilqees, 1990)
- Acanthogyrus holospinus (Sen, 1937)
- Acanthogyrus indicus (Tripathi, 1959)
- Acanthogyrus intermedius (Achmerov and Dombrovskaja-Achmerova, 1941)
- Acanthogyrus lizae (Wang, 1986)
- Acanthogyrus malawiensis Amin and Hendrix, 1999
- Acanthogyrus maroccanus (Dollfus, 1951)
- Acanthogyrus multispinus Wang, 1966
- Acanthogyrus nigeriensis Dollfus and Golvan, 1956
- Acanthogyrus papilo Troncy and Vassiliades, 1974
- Acanthogyrus parareceptaclis Amin, 2005
- Acanthogyrus partispinus (Furtado, 1963)
- Acanthogyrus paucispinus Wang, 1966
- Acanthogyrus periophthalmi (Wang, 1980)
- Acanthogyrus phillipi (Mashego, 1988)
- Acanthogyrus putitorae (Chowhan, Gupta and Khera, 1988)
- Acanthogyrus scomberomori (Wang, 1980)
- Acanthogyrus seenghalae (Chowhan, Gupta and Khera, 1988)
- Acanthogyrus shashiensis (Tso, Chen, and Chien, 1974)
- Acanthogyrus shuklai (Agrawal and Singh, 1982)
- Acanthogyrus siamensis (Farooqi and Sirikanchana, 1987)
- Acanthogyrus similis (Wang, 1980)
- Acanthogyrus sircari (Podder, 1941)
- Acanthogyrus thapari (Parasad, Sahay and Shambhunath, 1969)
- Acanthogyrus tilapiae (Baylis, 1948)
- Acanthogyrus vancleavei (Gupta and Fatma, 1986)
- Acanthogyrus vittatusi (Verma, 1973)

== Hosts ==
Acanthogyrus parasitizes fish.

== Distribution ==
The species of this genus are found in Africa.
