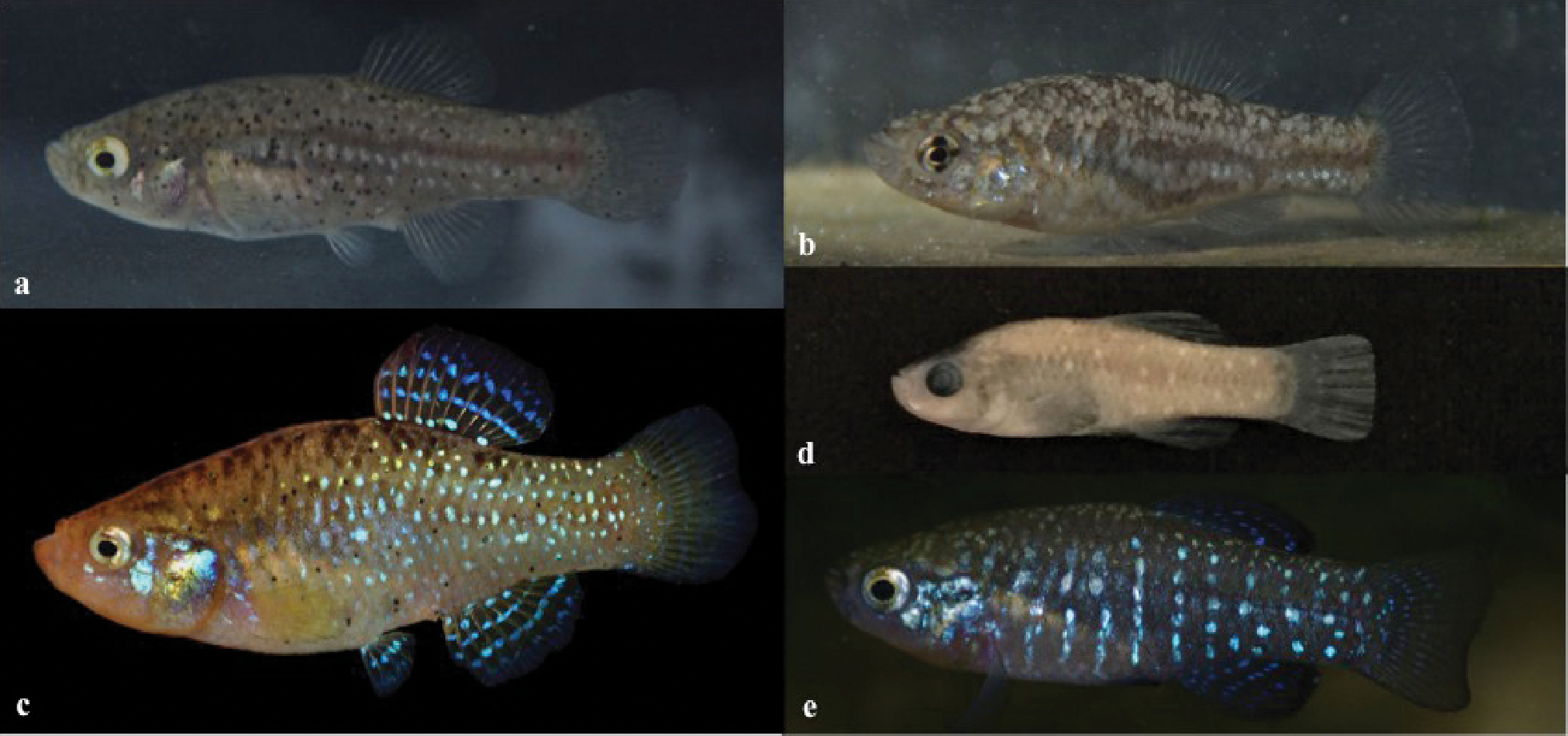
- a. Paraphanius alexandri; b. P. boulengeri; c. P. mento; d. P. orontis; e. P. similis

Scientific classification
- Kingdom: Animalia
- Phylum: Chordata
- Class: Actinopterygii
- Order: Cyprinodontiformes
- Family: Aphaniidae
- Genus: Paraphanius; Esmaeili, Teimori, Zarei & Sayyadzadeh, 2020

Type species
- Lebias mento Heckel, 1843

= Paraphanius =

Genus of fishes

Paraphanius is a genus of killifishes in the family Aphaniidae, which are native to western Asia (including Asia Minor). Several species in the genus have very limited distribution and may be threatened.

== Etymology ==
The generic name is derived from para, "near", and Aphanius, the genus from which they were split in 2020. It is a sister genus to Aphanius and Aphaniops.

=== Species ===
There are seven valid species:

- Paraphanius alexandri (Akşiray, 1948)
- Paraphanius boulengeri (Akşiray, 1948)
- Paraphanius mento (Heckel, 1843) (Pearl-spotted killifish)
- Paraphanius mentoides (Akşiray, 1948)
- Paraphanius orontis (Akşiray, 1948)
- Paraphanius similis (Akşiray, 1948)
- Paraphanius striptus (Goren, 1974)
