= Saefftigen's pouch =

Anatomical feature found in parasitic worms

Saefftigen's pouch is an anatomical feature found in male Acanthocephalans. It is an elongate genital pouch located inside the genital sheath which is continuous with the spaces of the bursal cap. It functions to inject fluid for eversion of the bursa.
