= Quadrigyridae =

Scientific classification
- Kingdom: Animalia
- Phylum: Acanthocephala
- Class: Eoacanthocephala
- Order: Gyracanthocephala; Van Cleve, 1936
- Family: Quadrigyridae; Van Cleve, 1920

Subfamilies
- Pallisentinae; Quadrigyrinae

Family of thorny-headed worms

Quadrigyridae is the only family within Gyracanthocephala, an order of parasitic worms of class Eoacanthocephala. This family contains two subfamilies, ten genera and about 92 species.

== Species ==
Species in Quadrigyridae are divided into two subfamilies: Pallisentinae Van Cleave, 1928 with five genera and Quadrigyrinae Van Cleave, 1920 with three. (Note: A binomial authority in parentheses indicates that the species was originally described in a genus other than the present genus.)

=== Pallisentinae Van Cleave, 1928 ===
This group is defied by.

==== Acanthogyrus ====
Golvan in 1959 divided the genus Acanthogyrus Thapar, 1927 into two subgenera: Acanthogyrus and Acanthosentis based on the number of proboscis hooks; there are 18 (3 circles of 6 hooks each) in Acanthosentis and 24 (3 circles of 8 hooks each) in Acanthogyrus.

Acanthogyrus (Acanthogyrus) Thapar, 1927

- Acanthogyrus acanthogyrus Thapar, 1927
- Acanthogyrus tripathi Rai, 1967

Acanthogyrus (Acanthosentis) Verma and Datta, 1929

- Acanthogyrus acanthuri (Cable and Quick, 1954)
- Acanthogyrus adriaticus Amin, 2005
- Acanthogyrus alternatspinus Amin, 2005
- Acanthogyrus anguillae (Wang, 1981)
- Acanthogyrus antespinus (Verma and Datta, 1929)
- Acanthogyrus arii (Bilqees, 1971)
- Acanthogyrus bacailai (Verma, 1973)
- Acanthogyrus barmeshoori Amin, Gholami, Akhlaghi and Heckmann, 2013
- Acanthogyrus betwai (Tripathi, 1956)
- Acanthogyrus bilaspurensis (Chowhan, Gupta and Khera, 1987)
- Acanthogyrus cameroni (Gupta and Kajaji, 1969)
- Acanthogyrus cheni Amin, 2005
- Acanthogyrus dattai (Podder, 1938)
- Acanthogyrus giuris (Soota and Sen, 1956)
- Acanthogyrus gobindi (Chowhan, Gupta and Khera, 1987)
- Acanthogyrus golvani (Gupta and Jain, 1980)
- Acanthogyrus heterospinus (Khan and Bilqees, 1990)
- Acanthogyrus holospinus (Sen, 1937)
- Acanthogyrus indicus (Tripathi, 1959)
- Acanthogyrus intermedius (Achmerov and Dombrovskaja-Achmerova, 1941)
- Acanthogyrus lizae (Wang, 1986)
- Acanthogyrus malawiensis Amin and Hendrix, 1999
- Acanthogyrus maroccanus (Dollfus, 1951)
- Acanthogyrus multispinus Wang, 1966
- Acanthogyrus nigeriensis Dollfus and Golvan, 1956
- Acanthogyrus papilo Troncy and Vassiliades, 1974
- Acanthogyrus parareceptaclis Amin, 2005
- Acanthogyrus partispinus (Furtado, 1963)
- Acanthogyrus paucispinus Wang, 1966
- Acanthogyrus periophthalmi (Wang, 1980)
- Acanthogyrus phillipi (Mashego, 1988)
- Acanthogyrus putitorae (Chowhan, Gupta and Khera, 1988)
- Acanthogyrus scomberomori (Wang, 1980)
- Acanthogyrus seenghalae (Chowhan, Gupta and Khera, 1988)
- Acanthogyrus shashiensis (Tso, Chen, and Chien, 1974)
- Acanthogyrus shuklai (Agrawal and Singh, 1982)
- Acanthogyrus siamensis (Farooqi and Sirikanchana, 1987)
- Acanthogyrus similis (Wang, 1980)
- Acanthogyrus sircari (Podder, 1941)
- Acanthogyrus thapari (Parasad, Sahay and Shambhunath, 1969)
- Acanthogyrus tilapiae (Baylis, 1948)
- Acanthogyrus vancleavei (Gupta and Fatma, 1986)
- Acanthogyrus vittatusi (Verma, 1973)

==== Hexaspiron ====
Hexaspiron Dollfus and Golvan, 1956 contains two species:

- Hexaspiron nigericum Dollfus and Golvan, 1956
- Hexaspiron spinibarbi Yu and Wang, 1977

==== Palliolisentis ====
Palliolisentis Machado-Filho, 1960 contains three species:

- Palliolisentis ornatus Machado-Filho, 1960
- Palliolisentis polyonca Schmidt and Hugghins, 1973
- Palliolisentis quinqueungulis Machado-Filho, 1960 (type species)

==== Pallisentis ====
Pallisentis Van Cleave, 1928 is divided into three subgenera: Brevitritospinus, Demidueterospinus, and Pallisentis with 26 species:

- Pallisentis channai Gupta, Maurya and Saxena, 2015
- Pallisentis vinodai Gupta, Maurya and Saxena, 2015

Pallisentis (Brevitritospinus) Amin, Heckmann, Ha, Luc and Doanh, 2000

- Pallisentis allahabadii Agarwal, 1958
- Pallisentis cavasii Gupta and Verma, 1980
- Pallisentis croftoni Mital and Lal, 1981
- Pallisentis fasciati Gupta and Verma, 1980
- Pallisentis fotedari Gupta and Sinha, 1991
- Pallisentis guntei Sahay, Nath, and Sinha, 1967
- Pallisentis indica Mital and Lal, 1981
- Pallisentis mehrai Gupta and Fatma, 1986
- Pallisentis punctati Gupta, Gupta, and Singhal, 2015
- Pallisentis vietnamensis Amin, Heckmann, Ha, Luc and Doanh, 2000

Pallisentis (Demidueterospinus) Amin, Heckmann, Ha, Luc and Doanh, 2000

- Pallisentis basiri Farooqi, 1958
- Pallisentis ophiocephali (Thapar, 1931)

Pallisentis (Pallisentis) Van Cleave, 1928

- Pallisentis celatus (Van Cleave, 1928)
- Pallisentis cholodkowskyi (Kostylev, 1928)
- Pallisentis chongqingensis Liu and Zhang, 1993
- Pallisentis clupei Gupta and Gupta, 1980
- Pallisentis colisai Sarkar, 1956
- Pallisentis gaboes (Maccallum, 1918)
- Pallisentis garuai (Sahay, Sinha and Ghosh, 1971)
- Pallisentis gomtii Gupta and Verma, 1980
- Pallisentis guptai Gupta and Fatma, 1986
- Pallisentis jagani Koul, Raina, Bambroo and Koul, 1992
- Pallisentis kalriai Khan and Bilqees, 1985
- Pallisentis magnum Saeed and Bilgees, 1971
- Pallisentis nagpurensis' (Bhalerao, 1931)
- Pallisentis nandai Sarkar, 1953
- Pallisentis pesteri (Tadros, 1966)
- Pallisentis rexus Wongkham and Whitfield, 1999
- Pallisentis singaporensis Khan and Ip, 1988
- Pallisentis sindensis Khan and Bilqees, 1987
- Pallisentis umbellatus Van Cleave, 1928
- Pallisentis ussuriensis (Kostylev, 1941)

==== Pararaosentis ====
Pararaosentis Amin, Heckmann, Ha, Luc and Doanh, 2000 contains only one species:

- Pararaosentis golvani (Troncy and Vassiliades, 1973)

==== Raosentis ====
Raosentis Datta, 1947 contains five species:

- Raosentis dattai Gupta and Fatma, 1986
- Raosentis godavarensis Vankara and Vijayalakshmi, 2009
- Raosentis ivaniosi George and Nadakal, 1978
- Raosentis podderi Datta, 1947
- Raosentis thapari Rai, 1967

==== Triaspiron ====
Triaspiron Smales, Aydogdu and Emre, 2012 contains only one species:

- Triaspiron aphanii Smales, Aydogdu and Emre, 2012

=== Quadrigyrinae Van Cleave, 1920 ===
==== Acanthodelta ====
Acanthodelta Diaz-Ungria and Gracia-Rodrigo, 1958 contains one species:

- Acanthodelta scorzai (Diaz-Ungria and Gracia-Rodrigo, 1957)

==== Machadosentis ====
Machadosentis Noronha, 1992 contains only one species:

- Machadosentis travassosi Noronha, 1992

==== Quadrigyrus ====
Quadrigyrus Van Cleave, 1920 contains 9 species:

- Quadrigyrus brasiliensis Machado-Filho, 1941
- Quadrigyrus chinensis Mao, 1979
- Quadrigyrus guptai Gupta and Gunjan-Sinh, 1992
- Quadrigyrus machadoi Fabio, 1983
- Quadrigyrus nickoli Schmidt and Hugghins, 1973
- Quadrigyrus polyspinosus Li, 1984
- Quadrigyrus rhodei Wang, 1980
- Quadrigyrus simhai Gupta and Fatma, 1986
- Quadrigyrus torquatus Van Cleave, 1920

== Hosts ==
Quadrigyridae species parasitize fish.

Hosts for Quadrigyridae species

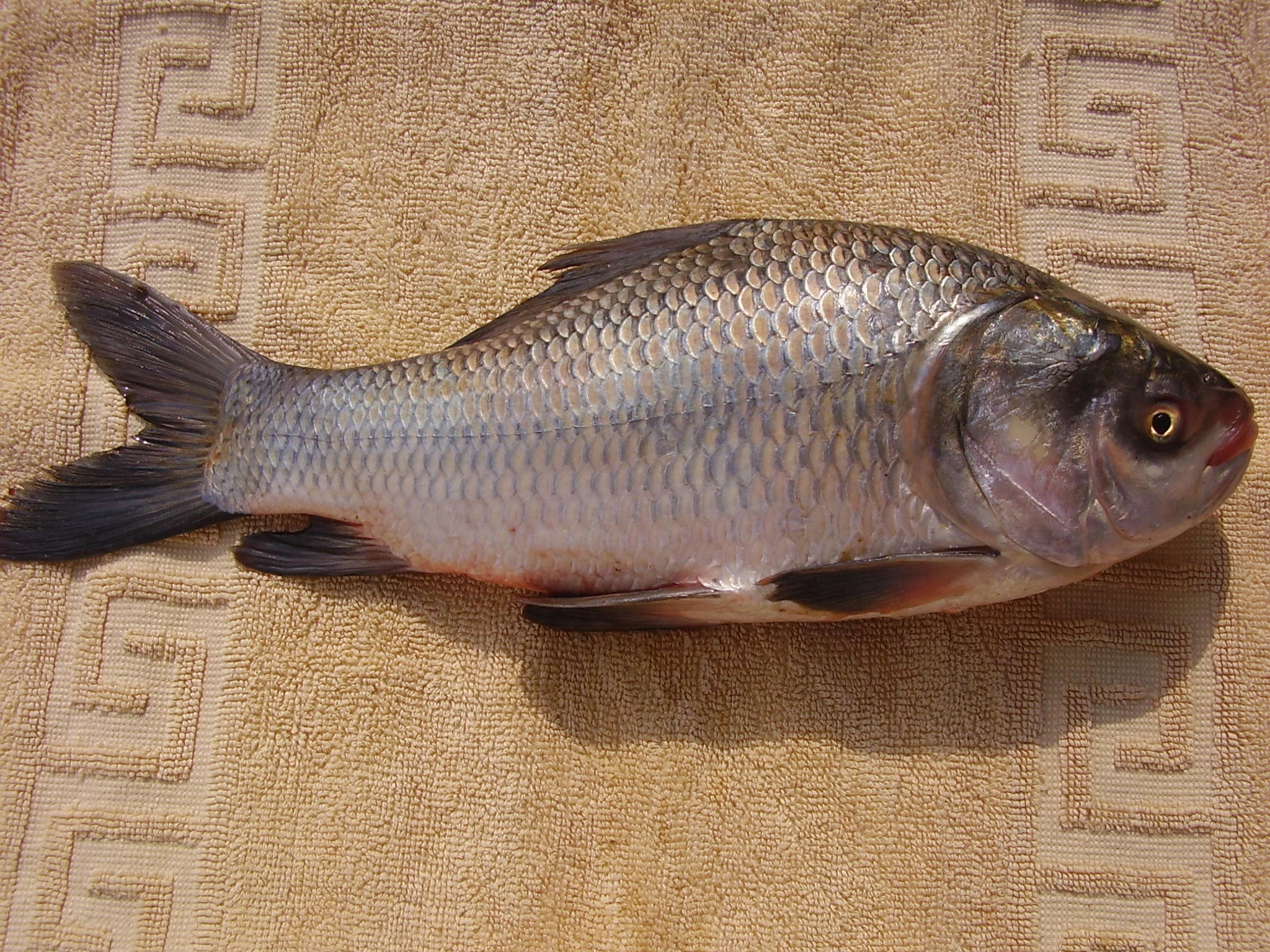
The catla is a host of Acanthogyrus acanthogyrus
