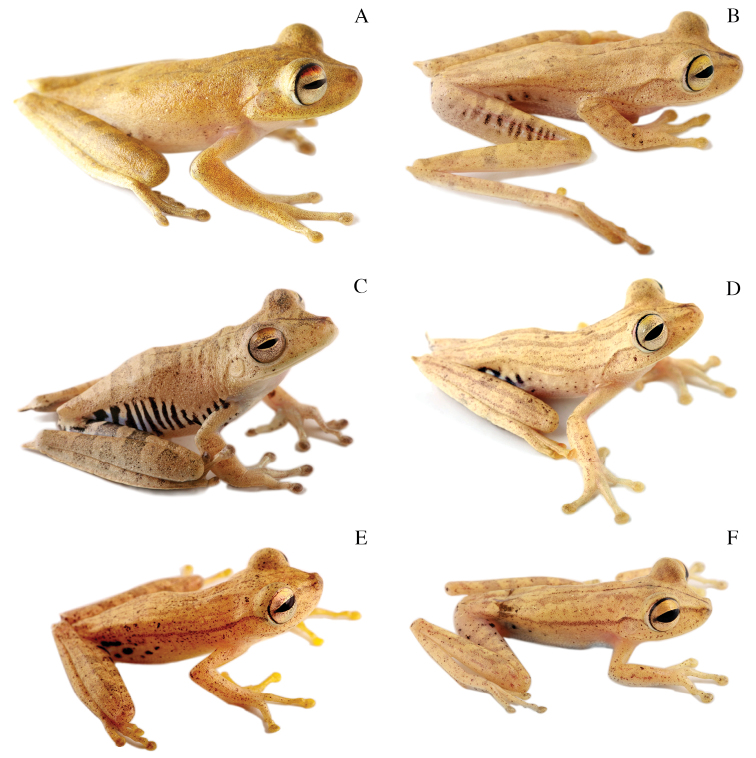

Scientific classification
- Kingdom: Animalia
- Phylum: Chordata
- Class: Amphibia
- Order: Anura
- Family: Hylidae
- Genus: Boana
- Species: B. maculateralis

Binomial name
- Boana maculateralis (Caminer and Ron, 2014)

Synonyms
- Hypsiboas maculateralis Caminer and Ron, 2014

= Boana maculateralis =

Species of amphibian

The stained tree frog (Boana maculateralis) is a frog in the family Hylidae endemic to Ecuador, Colombia, and Peru. Scientists have seen it between 186 and 354 meters above sea level.

This is a medium-sized frog with large eyes and large climbing disks on its toes. The adult male frog measures 31.9 to 39.2 mm in snout-vent length and the adult female frog is 32.0 to 55.3 mm. It has light brown skin with darker marks. Some individuals have a single line from the head to the middle of the back. Some indidivudals have small brown spots. Larger females have blue coloration on their flanks. Males have lighter or white coloration on their flanks. This frog has prominent spikes near its vent.

This frog is sympatric with Boana calcarata, Boana alfaroi, Boana calcarata, and possibly Boana tetete.

This frog is nocturnal. It lives in forests. Scientists have observed it perched on plants 2 meters above the ground.

The Latin name of this frog means "stains on its sides".
