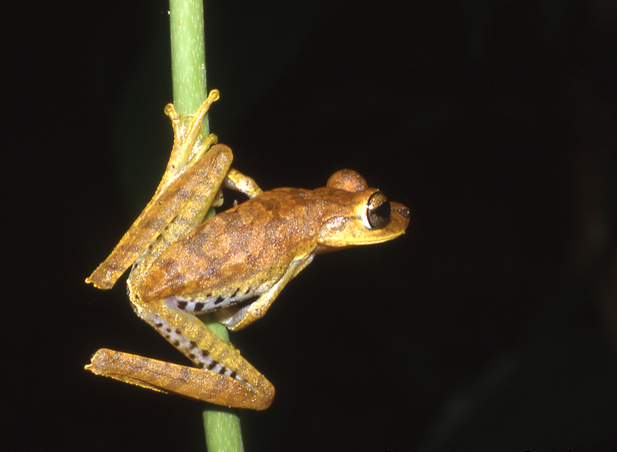

Conservation status
- Least Concern (IUCN 3.1)

Scientific classification
- Kingdom: Animalia
- Phylum: Chordata
- Class: Amphibia
- Order: Anura
- Family: Hylidae
- Genus: Boana
- Species: B. fasciata

Binomial name
- Boana fasciata (Günther, 1858)

Synonyms
- Hyla fasciata Günther, 1858; Hypsiboas fasciatus (Günther, 1858)

= Gunther's banded tree frog =

Species of amphibian

Gunther's banded tree frog (Boana fasciata) is a species of frog in the family Hylidae. The species was re-delimited in 2014 and most of the earlier records assigned to this species refer to Boana maculateralis, Boana alfaroi, Boana tetete, and possibly also to an unnamed species. It is known with certainty only from the upper and lower montane forests on the western edge of the Amazon Basin in Ecuador (Zamora-Chinchipe, Morona-Santia, and Pichincha Provinces) and Peru (Amazonas Region), at elevations of 730–1,530 m (2,400–5,020 ft) above sea level.
