= Species =

Basic unit of taxonomic classification, below genus

The hierarchy of biological classification's eight major taxonomic ranks. A genus contains one or more species. Minor intermediate ranks are not shown.

A species (pl. species) is the basic unit of classification and a taxonomic rank of an organism, as well as a unit of biodiversity. It can be defined as the largest group of organisms in which any two individuals of the appropriate sexes or mating types can produce fertile offspring, typically by sexual reproduction. Other ways of defining species include their karyotype, DNA sequence, morphology, behaviour, or ecological niche. In addition, palaeontologists use the concept of the chronospecies since fossil reproduction cannot be examined. The most recent rigorous estimate for the total number of species of eukaryotes is between 8 and 8.7 million. About 14% of these had been described by 2011. All species are given a two-part binomial name. The first part is the name of the genus to which the species belongs. The second part is called the specific name or the specific epithet (in botanical nomenclature, also sometimes in zoological nomenclature). For example, Boa constrictor is one of the species of the genus Boa, with constrictor being the specific name.

While the definitions given above may seem adequate at first glance, when looked at more closely they represent problematic species concepts. For example, the boundaries between closely related species become unclear with hybridisation, in a species complex of hundreds of similar microspecies, and in a ring species. Also, among organisms that reproduce only asexually, the concept of a reproductive species breaks down, and each clonal lineage is potentially a microspecies. Although none of these are entirely satisfactory definitions, and while the concept of species may not be a perfect model of life, it is still a useful tool to scientists and conservationists for studying life on Earth, regardless of the theoretical difficulties. If species were fixed and distinct from one another, there would be no problem, but evolutionary processes cause species to change. This obliges taxonomists to decide, for example, when enough change has occurred to declare that a fossil lineage should be divided into multiple chronospecies, or when populations have diverged to have enough distinct character states to be described as cladistic species.

Species and higher taxa were seen from Aristotle until the 18th century as categories that could be arranged in a hierarchy, the great chain of being. In the 19th century, biologists grasped that species could evolve given sufficient time. Charles Darwin's 1859 book On the Origin of Species explained how species could arise by natural selection. That understanding was greatly extended in the 20th century through genetics and population ecology. Genetic variability arises from mutations and recombination, while organisms are mobile, leading to geographical isolation and genetic drift with varying selection pressures. Genes can sometimes be exchanged between species by horizontal gene transfer; new species can arise rapidly through hybridisation and polyploidy; and species may become extinct for a variety of reasons, with several mass extinction events occurring throughout history. Viruses are a special case, driven by a balance of mutation and selection, and can be treated as quasispecies.

== Definition ==
Biologists and taxonomists have made many attempts to define species, beginning from morphology and moving towards genetics. Early taxonomists such as Linnaeus had no option but to describe what they saw: this was later formalised as the typological or morphological species concept. Ernst Mayr emphasised reproductive isolation, but this, like other species concepts, can be hard or even impossible to test for groups of organisms separated in space or time. Later biologists have tried to refine Mayr's definition with the recognition and cohesion concepts, among others. Many of the concepts are quite similar or overlap, so they are not easy to count: the biologist R. L. Mayden recorded about 24 concepts, and the philosopher of science John Wilkins counted 26. Wilkins further grouped the species concepts into seven basic kinds:

1. agamospecies for asexual organisms
2. biospecies for reproductively isolated sexual organisms
3. ecospecies based on ecological niches
4. evolutionary species based on lineage
5. genetic species based on gene pool
6. morphospecies based on form or phenotype and
7. taxonomic species, a species as determined by a taxonomist.

=== Typological or morphological species ===
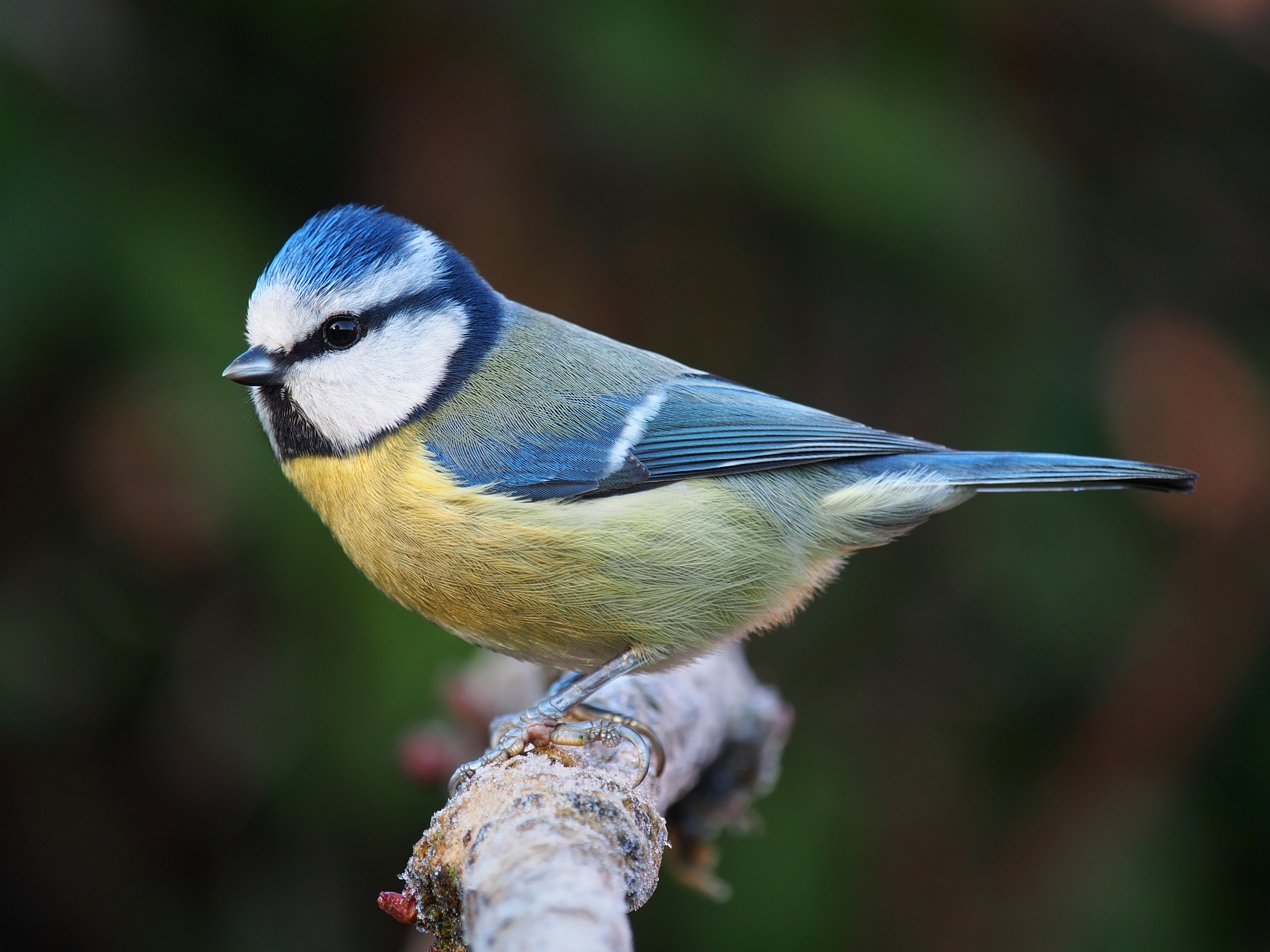
All adult Eurasian blue tits share the same coloration, unmistakably identifying the morphospecies.

A typological species is a group of organisms in which individuals conform to certain fixed properties (a type, which may be defined by a chosen 'nominal species'), so that even pre-literate people often recognise the same taxon as do modern taxonomists. Modern-day field guides and identification websites such as iNaturalist use this concept. The clusters of variations or phenotypes within specimens (such as longer or shorter tails) would differentiate the species. This method was used as a "classical" method of determining species, such as with Linnaeus, early in evolutionary theory. However, different phenotypes are not necessarily different species (e.g. a four-winged Drosophila born to a two-winged mother is not a different species). Species named in this manner are called morphospecies.

In the 1970s, Robert R. Sokal, Theodore J. Crovello and Peter Sneath proposed a variation on the morphological species concept, a phenetic species, defined as a set of organisms with a similar phenotype to each other, but a different phenotype from other sets of organisms. It differs from the morphological species concept in including a numerical measure of distance or similarity to cluster entities based on multivariate comparisons of a reasonably large number of phenotypic traits.

=== Recognition and cohesion species ===
A mate-recognition species is a group of sexually reproducing organisms that recognise one another as potential mates. Expanding on this to allow for post-mating isolation, a cohesion species is the most inclusive population of individuals having the potential for phenotypic cohesion through intrinsic cohesion mechanisms; no matter whether populations can hybridise successfully, they are still distinct cohesion species if the amount of hybridisation is insufficient to completely mix their respective gene pools. A further development of the recognition concept is provided by the biosemiotic concept of species.

=== Genetic similarity and barcode species ===
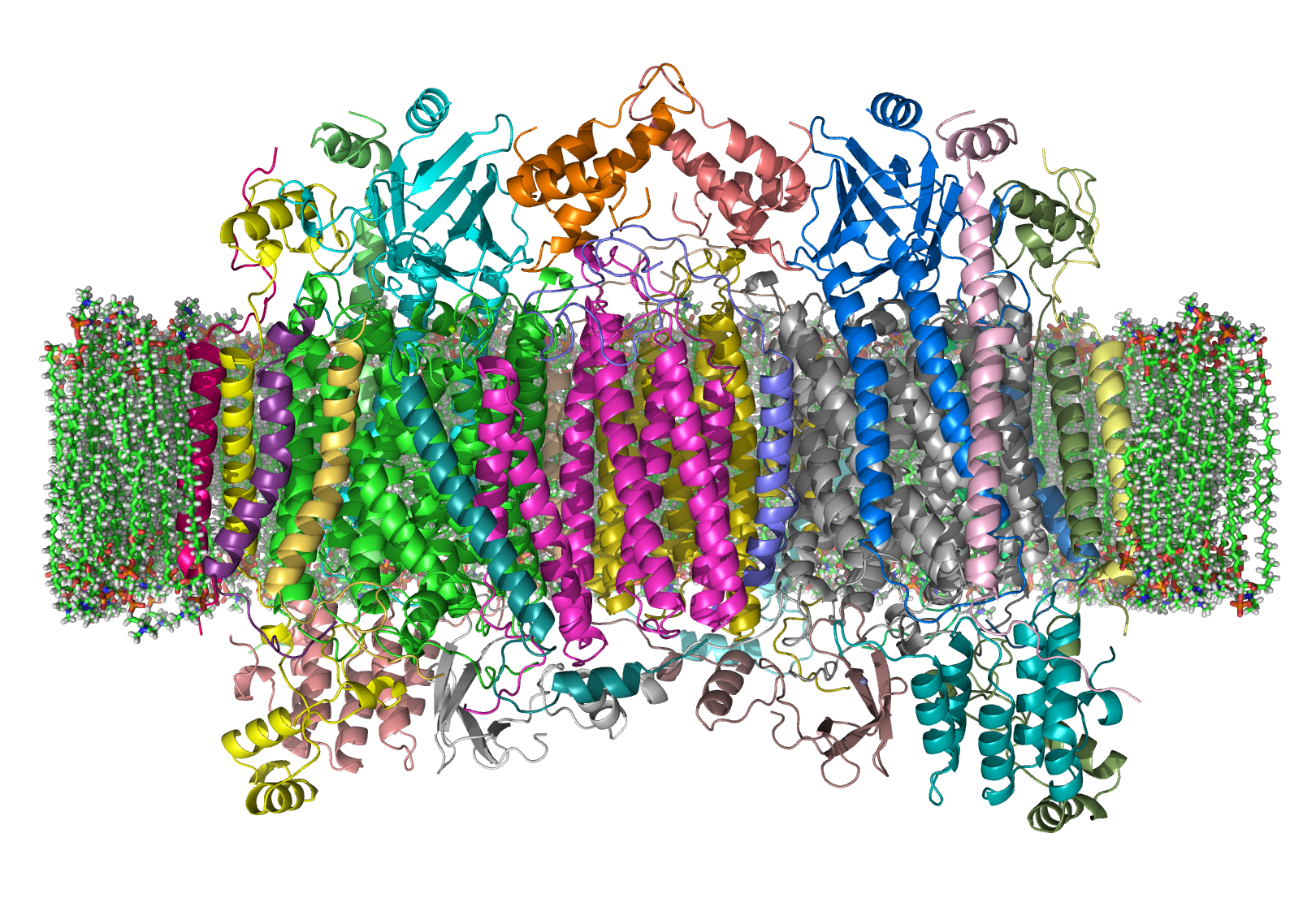
A region of the gene for the cytochrome c oxidase enzyme is used to distinguish species in the Barcode of Life Data Systems database.

==== Single locus (barcoding) ====
In microbiology, genes can move freely even between distantly related bacteria, possibly extending to the whole bacterial domain. As a rule of thumb, microbiologists had assumed that members of Bacteria or Archaea with 16S ribosomal RNA gene sequences more similar than 97% to each other need to be checked by DNA–DNA hybridisation to decide if they belong to the same species. This concept was narrowed in 2006 to a similarity of 98.7%.

The 16S sequence is an example of a single locus which is simple enough for non-specialists to apply and, in most cases, sufficient to distinguish species. Using a single easy-to-use locus to distinguish taxa is called DNA barcoding. One of the barcodes for eukaryotes is a region of mitochondrial DNA within the gene for cytochrome c oxidase. A database, Barcode of Life Data System, contains DNA barcode sequences from over 190,000 species. However, scientists such as Rob DeSalle have expressed concern that classical taxonomy and DNA barcoding, which they consider a misnomer, need to be reconciled, as they delimit species differently. Genetic introgression mediated by endosymbionts and other vectors can further make barcodes ineffective in the identification of species.

A singular locus can be a good proxy of time of divergence assuming the chosen locus evolved like most of the rest of the genome. This assumption can be broken by horizontal gene transfer affecting the locus itself. Rapid modes of evolution separating biological species (speciation) over a short timespan would also decouple the species concept from time itself. Among bacteria, there are several cases where very different genomes share 99.9% 16S identity.

==== Multilocus comparison ====
Using multiple (usually fewer than 10) loci for comparison provides more phylogenetic signal compared to comparing versions of the same loci as more mutations can be captured. As a result, it provides improved taxonomic resolution compared to single-locus comparison, giving results more similar to the expensive "gold standard" of whole genome comparison at a small increase in cost.

Even when whole genomes are available, there are good reasons to only compare select genes: many genes are not universally found in all genomes, so they provide limited taxonomic signal while still adding to the computational cost of comparison. In situations like this, tens to hundreds of loci may be extracted from each genome and used together. As with comparisons with fewer loci, marker genes used for this purpose should be genes with low rates of horizontal transfer and gene duplication, few known instances of horizontal transfer, and high occurrence in the sampled genomes. With prokaryotes, marker genes can be used to delimit taxa down to the genus level, with whole-genome comparison reserved to separate species from each other.

==== Whole genome comparison ====
The surefire way to capture all gene flow among populations is to compare their entire genomes. The average nucleotide identity (ANI) method quantifies genetic distance between entire genomes, using regions of about 10,000 base pairs. With enough data from genomes of one genus, algorithms can be used to categorize species, as for Pseudomonas avellanae in 2013, and for all sequenced bacteria and archaea since 2020. Observed ANI values among prokaryotic sequences appear to have an "ANI gap" at 85–95%, suggesting that a genetic boundary suitable for defining a species concept is present.

=== Phylogenetic or cladistic species ===
The cladistic or phylogenetic species concept is that a species is the smallest lineage which is distinguished by a unique set of either genetic or morphological traits. No claim is made about reproductive isolation, making the concept useful also in palaeontology where only fossil evidence is available.

A phylogenetic or cladistic species is "the smallest aggregation of populations (sexual) or lineages (asexual) diagnosable by a unique combination of character states in comparable individuals (semaphoronts)". The empirical basis – observed character states – provides the evidence to support hypotheses about evolutionarily divergent lineages that have maintained their hereditary integrity through time and space. Molecular markers may be used to determine diagnostic genetic differences in the nuclear or mitochondrial DNA of various species. For example, in a study done on fungi, studying the nucleotide characters using cladistic species produced the most accurate results in recognising the numerous fungi species of all the concepts studied. Versions of the phylogenetic species concept that emphasise monophyly or diagnosability may lead to splitting of existing species, for example in Bovidae, by recognising old subspecies as species, despite the fact that there are no reproductive barriers, and populations may intergrade morphologically. Others have called this approach taxonomic inflation, diluting the species concept and making taxonomy unstable. Yet others defend this approach, considering "taxonomic inflation" pejorative and labelling the opposing view as "taxonomic conservatism"; claiming it is politically expedient to split species and recognise smaller populations at the species level, because this means they can more easily be included as endangered in the IUCN red list and can attract conservation legislation and funding.

Unlike the biological species concept, a cladistic species does not rely on reproductive isolation – its criteria are independent of processes that are integral in other concepts. Therefore, it applies to asexual lineages. However, it does not always provide clear cut and intuitively satisfying boundaries between taxa, and may require multiple sources of evidence, such as more than one polymorphic locus, to give plausible results.

=== Evolutionary species ===
An evolutionary species, suggested by George Gaylord Simpson in 1951, is "an entity composed of organisms which maintains its identity from other such entities through time and over space, and which has its own independent evolutionary fate and historical tendencies". This differs from the biological species concept in embodying persistence over time. Wiley and Mayden stated that they see the evolutionary species concept as "identical" to Willi Hennig's species-as-lineages concept, and asserted that the biological species concept, "the several versions" of the phylogenetic species concept, and the idea that species are of the same kind as higher taxa are not suitable for biodiversity studies (with the intention of estimating the number of species accurately). They further suggested that the concept works for both asexual and sexually-reproducing species. A version of the concept is Kevin de Queiroz's "General Lineage Concept of Species".

=== Ecological species ===
An ecological species is a set of organisms adapted to a particular set of resources, called a niche, in the environment. According to this concept, populations form the discrete phenetic clusters that we recognise as species because the ecological and evolutionary processes controlling how resources are divided up tend to produce those clusters.

=== Genetic species ===
A genetic species as defined by Robert Baker and Robert Bradley is a set of genetically isolated interbreeding populations. This is similar to Mayr's Biological Species Concept, but stresses genetic rather than reproductive isolation. In the 21st century, a genetic species could be established by comparing DNA sequences. Earlier, other methods were available, such as comparing karyotypes (sets of chromosomes) and allozymes (enzyme variants).

=== Evolutionarily significant unit ===
An evolutionarily significant unit (ESU) or "wildlife species" is a population of organisms considered distinct for purposes of conservation.

=== Chronospecies ===
A chronospecies is defined in a single lineage (solid line) whose morphology changes with time. At some point, palaeontologists judge that enough change has occurred that two species (A and B), separated in time and anatomy, once existed.

In palaeontology, with only comparative anatomy (morphology) and histology from fossils as evidence, the concept of a chronospecies can be applied. During anagenesis (evolution, not necessarily involving branching), some palaeontologists seek to identify a sequence of species, each one derived from the phyletically extinct one before through continuous, slow and more or less uniform change. In such a time sequence, some palaeontologists assess how much change is required for a morphologically distinct form to be considered a different species from its ancestors.

=== Viral quasispecies ===
Viruses have enormous populations, are doubtfully living since they consist of little more than a string of DNA or RNA in a protein coat, and mutate rapidly. All of these factors make conventional species concepts largely inapplicable. A viral quasispecies is a group of genotypes related by similar mutations, competing within a highly mutagenic environment, and hence governed by a mutation–selection balance. It is predicted that a viral quasispecies at a low but evolutionarily neutral and highly connected (that is, flat) region in the fitness landscape will outcompete a quasispecies located at a higher but narrower fitness peak in which the surrounding mutants are unfit, "the quasispecies effect" or the "survival of the flattest". There is no suggestion that a viral quasispecies resembles a traditional biological species. The International Committee on Taxonomy of Viruses has since 1962 developed a universal taxonomic scheme for viruses; this has stabilised viral taxonomy.

=== Mayr's biological species concept ===
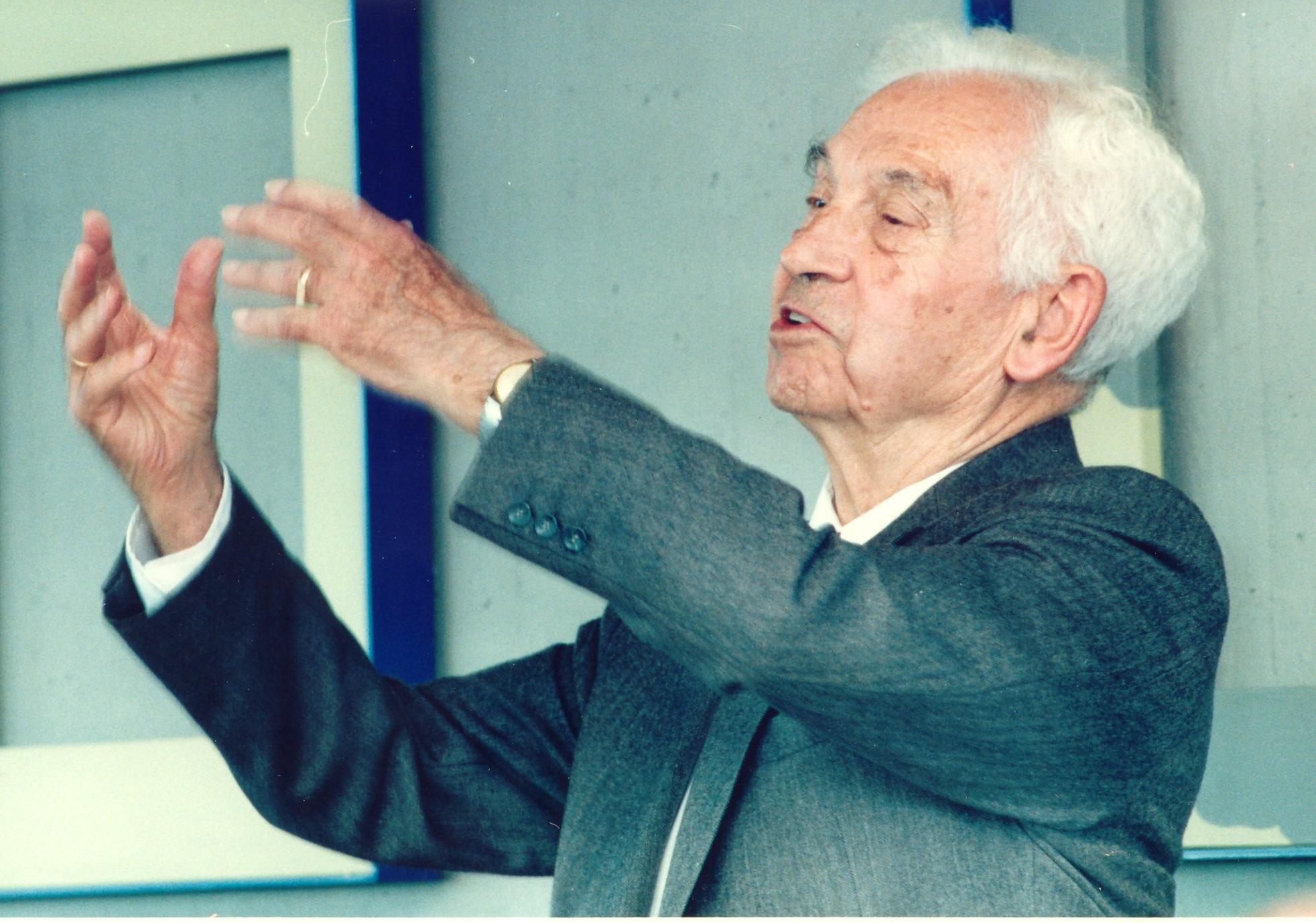
Ernst Mayr proposed the widely used Biological Species Concept of reproductive isolation in 1942.

Most modern textbooks make use of Ernst Mayr's 1942 definition, known as the biological species concept, as a basis for further discussion on the definition of species. It is also called a reproductive or isolation concept. This defines a species as

groups of actually or potentially interbreeding natural populations, which are reproductively isolated from other such groups.

It has been argued that this definition is a natural consequence of the effect of sexual reproduction on the dynamics of natural selection. Mayr's use of the adjective "potentially" has been a point of debate; some interpretations exclude unusual or artificial matings that occur only in captivity, or that involve animals capable of mating but that do not normally do so in the wild.

The renewing species concept extends Mayr's biological species definition to also include agamous (asexual) organisms. It extends the concept of interbreeding, the "glue" binding separate individuals into a species, to the concept of renewal cohesion, the "glue" that works both for sexual and agamous organisms. Renewal cohesion is "the restriction of genetic diversity of a group of related individuals as a result of their recent origin from a common ancestor". This limitation on genetic diversity results from the effects of genetic drift explained by coalescent theory, which is sufficient to restrict genetic diversity even in the absence of selection. Reproductive isolation as "anti-interbreeding" and a prerequisite for speciation, is extended to renewal isolation, inclusive of both sexual and agamous organisms.

A renewing species "is the most inclusive group of individuals, which are united by renewal cohesion, i.e. 1) are reproduced in a specific ecological niche and 2) are genetically similar due to recent origin of their genomes (as whole uninterrupted DNA stretches or in parts) from genomes of ancestral individuals. [...] Applied to sexuals, the concept of renewal species is reduced to Mayr’s biological concept".

Apart from the connection with Mayr's biological species concept, renewing species borrows its mechanism of cohesion from Templeton's "cohesion via genetic drift" (one of cohesion species mechanisms described in).

== The species problem ==
It is difficult to define a species in a way that applies to all organisms. This debate about species concepts is called the species problem. The problem was recognised even in 1859, when Darwin wrote in On the Origin of Species:

I was much struck how entirely vague and arbitrary is the distinction between species and varieties.

He went on to write:

No one definition has satisfied all naturalists; yet every naturalist knows vaguely what he means when he speaks of a species. Generally the term includes the unknown element of a distinct act of creation.

=== Problems with simple definitions of species ===
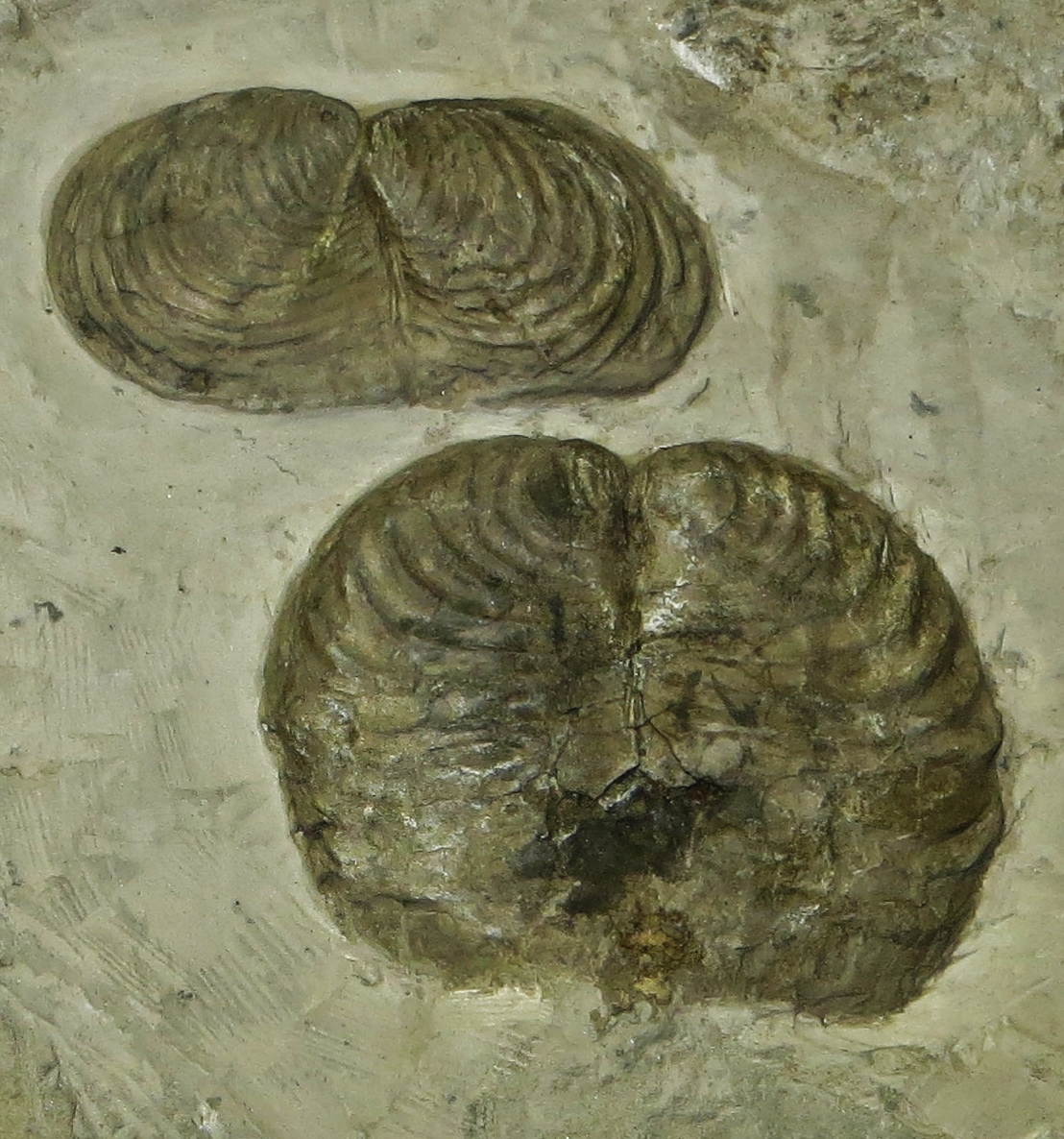
Palaeontologists are limited to morphological evidence when deciding whether fossil life-forms like these Inoceramus bivalves formed a separate species.

Many authors have argued that a simple textbook definition, following Mayr's concept, works well for most multi-celled organisms, but breaks down in several situations:

- When organisms reproduce asexually, as in single-celled organisms such as bacteria and other prokaryotes, and parthenogenetic or apomictic multi-celled organisms. DNA barcoding and phylogenetics are commonly used in these cases. The term quasispecies is sometimes used for rapidly mutating entities like viruses.
- When scientists do not know whether two morphologically similar groups of organisms are capable of interbreeding; this is the case with all extinct life-forms in palaeontology, as breeding experiments are not possible.
- When hybridisation permits substantial gene flow between species.
- In ring species, when members of adjacent populations in a widely continuous distribution range interbreed successfully but members of more distant populations do not.
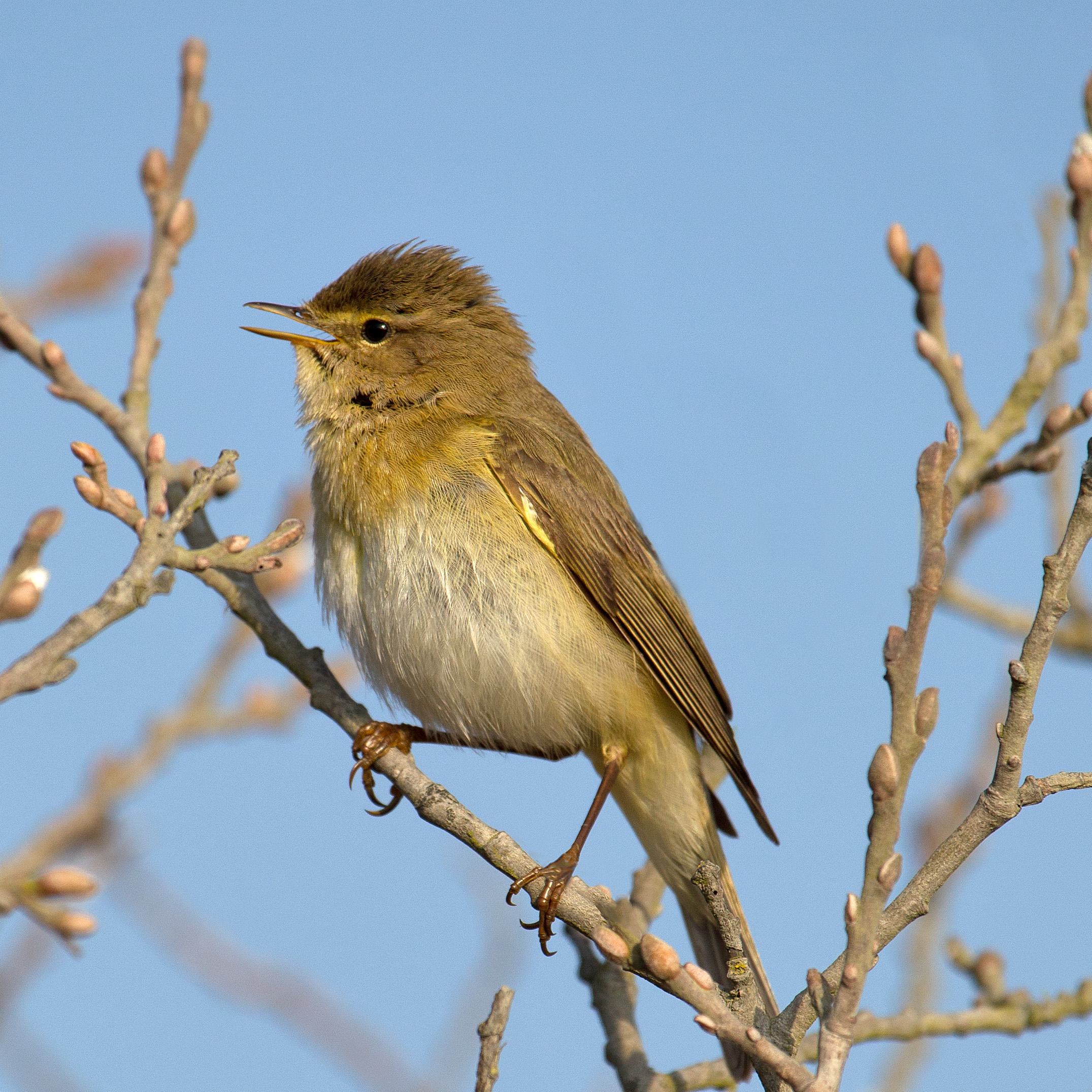
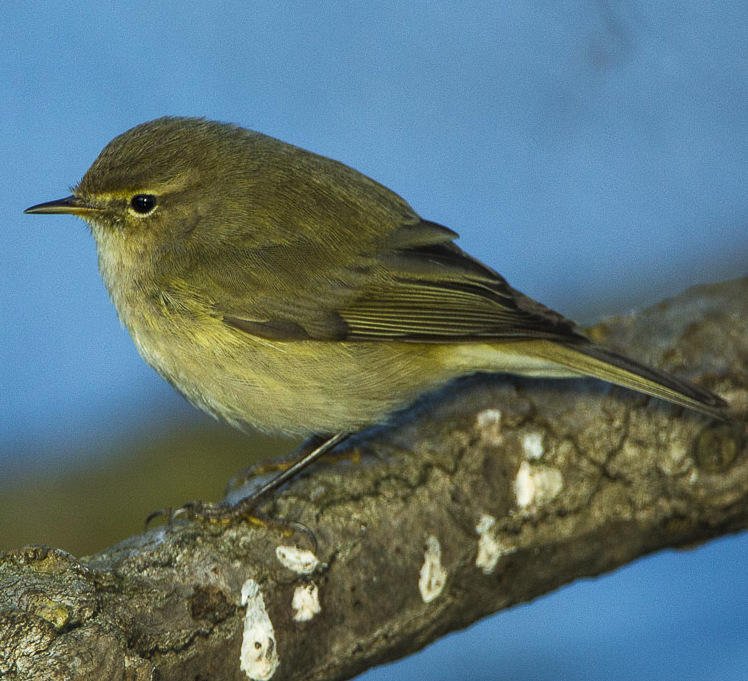
The willow warbler and chiffchaff are almost identical in appearance but do not interbreed.

Species identification is made difficult by discordance between molecular and morphological investigations; these can be categorised as two types: (i) one morphology, multiple lineages (e.g. morphological convergence, cryptic species) and (ii) one lineage, multiple morphologies (e.g. phenotypic plasticity, multiple life-cycle stages). In addition, horizontal gene transfer (HGT) makes it difficult to define a species. All species definitions assume that an organism acquires its genes from one or two parents very like the "daughter" organism, but that is not what happens in HGT. There is strong evidence of HGT between very dissimilar groups of prokaryotes, and at least occasionally between dissimilar groups of eukaryotes, including some crustaceans and echinoderms.

The evolutionary biologist James Mallet concludes that

there is no easy way to tell whether related geographic or temporal forms belong to the same or different species. Species gaps can be verified only locally and at a point of time. One is forced to admit that Darwin's insight is correct: any local reality or integrity of species is greatly reduced over large geographic ranges and time periods.

The botanist Brent Mishler argued that the species concept is not valid, notably because gene flow decreases gradually rather than in discrete steps, which hampers objective delimitation of species. Indeed, complex and unstable patterns of gene flow have been observed in cichlid teleosts of the East African Great Lakes. Wilkins argued that "if we were being true to evolution and the consequent phylogenetic approach to taxa, we should replace it with a 'smallest clade' idea" (a phylogenetic species concept). Mishler and Wilkins and others concur with this approach, even though this would raise difficulties in biological nomenclature. Wilkins cited the ichthyologist Charles Tate Regan's early 20th century remark that "a species is whatever a suitably qualified biologist chooses to call a species". Wilkins noted that the philosopher Philip Kitcher called this the "cynical species concept", and arguing that far from being cynical, it usefully leads to an empirical taxonomy for any given group, based on taxonomists' experience. Other biologists have gone further and argued that we should abandon species entirely, and refer to the "Least Inclusive Taxonomic Units" (LITUs), a view that would be coherent with current evolutionary theory.

=== Aggregates of microspecies ===
The species concept is further weakened by the existence of microspecies, groups of organisms, including many plants, with very little genetic variability, usually forming species aggregates. For example, the dandelion Taraxacum officinale and the blackberry Rubus fruticosus are aggregates with many microspecies—perhaps 400 in the case of the blackberry and over 200 in the dandelion in Britain alone, complicated by hybridisation, apomixis and polyploidy, making gene flow between populations difficult to determine, and their taxonomy debatable. Species complexes occur in insects such as Heliconius butterflies, vertebrates such as Hypsiboas treefrogs, and fungi such as the fly agaric.

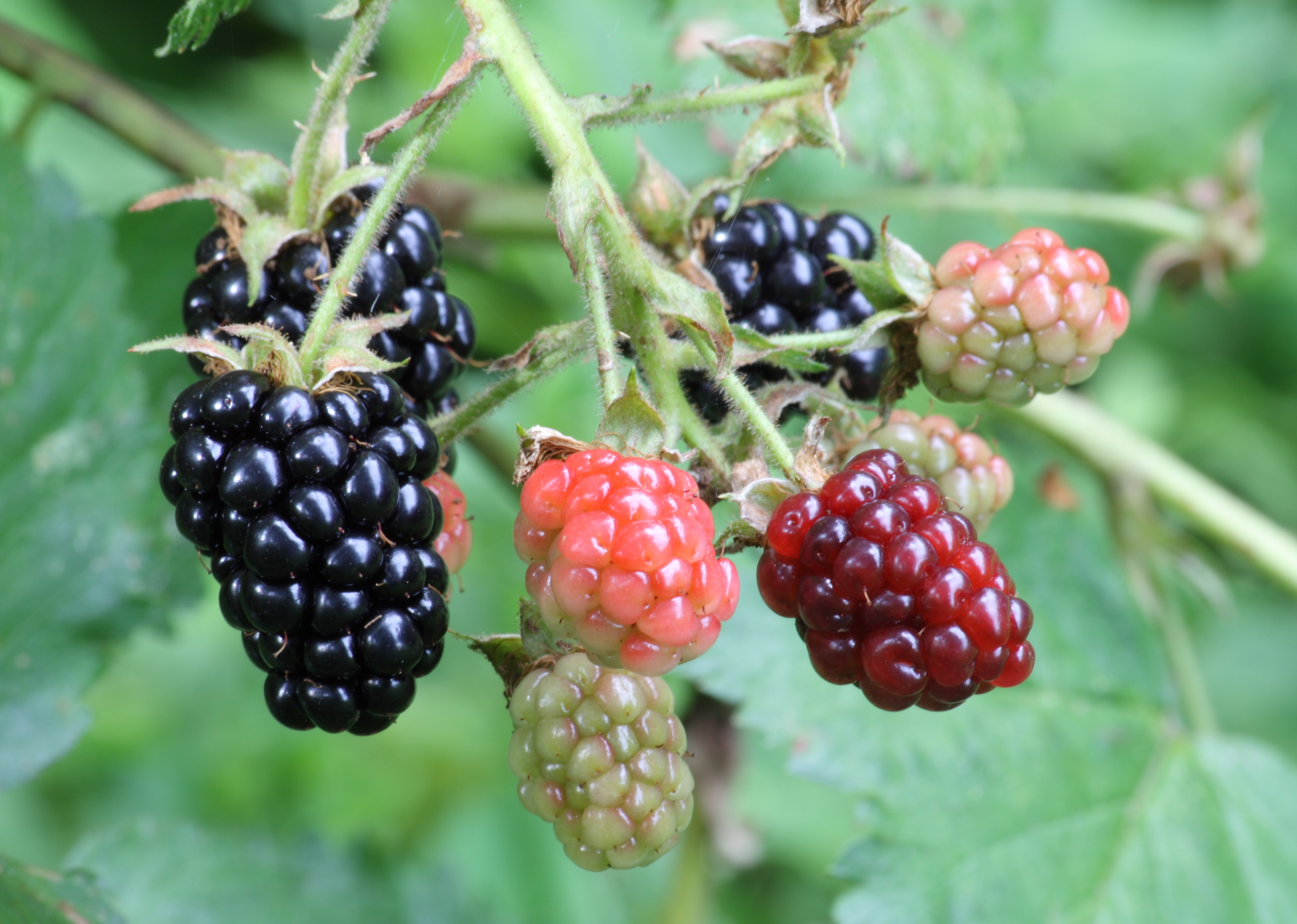
Blackberries belong to any of hundreds of microspecies of the Rubus fruticosus species aggregate.

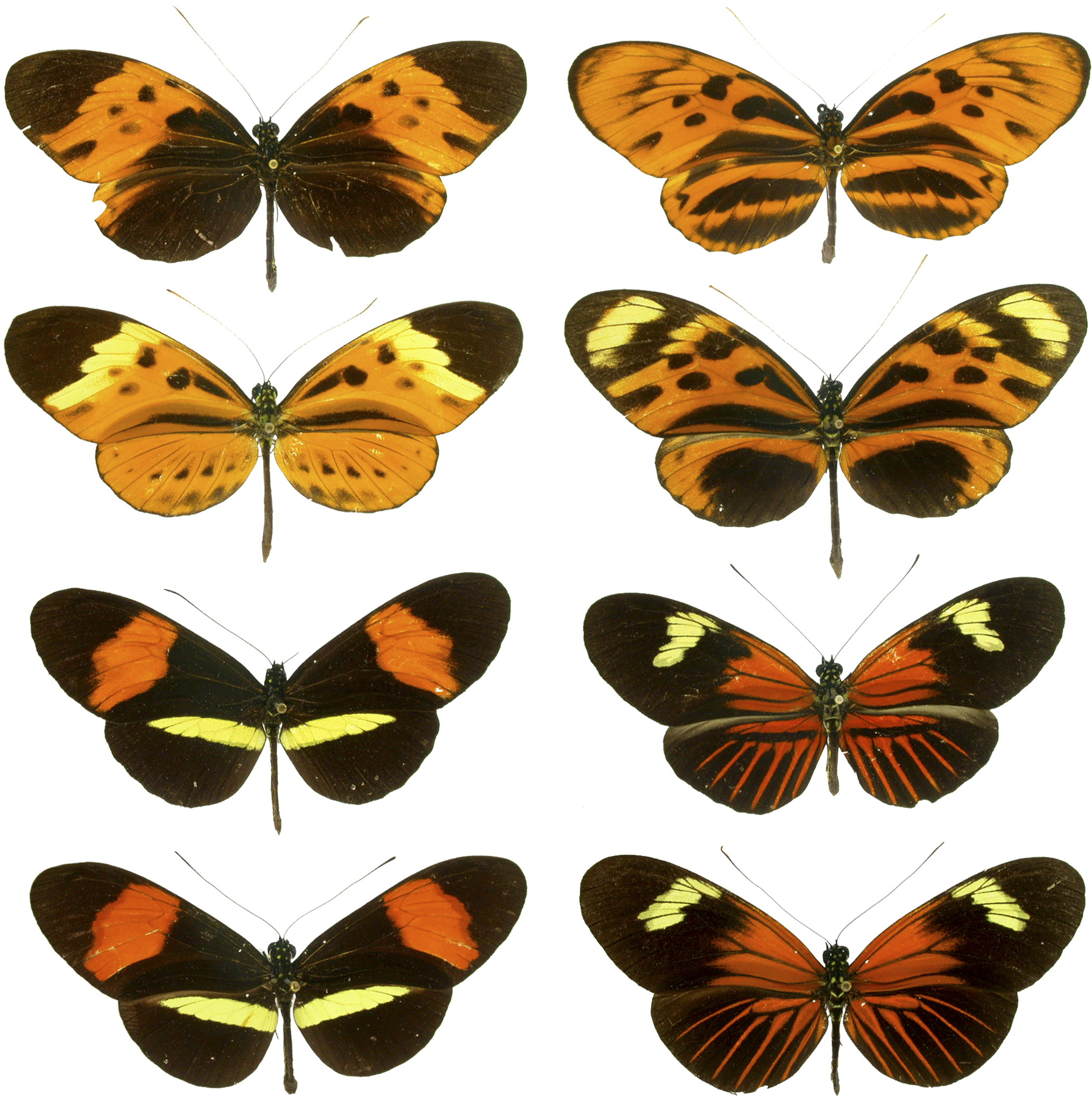
The butterfly genus Heliconius contains many similar species.

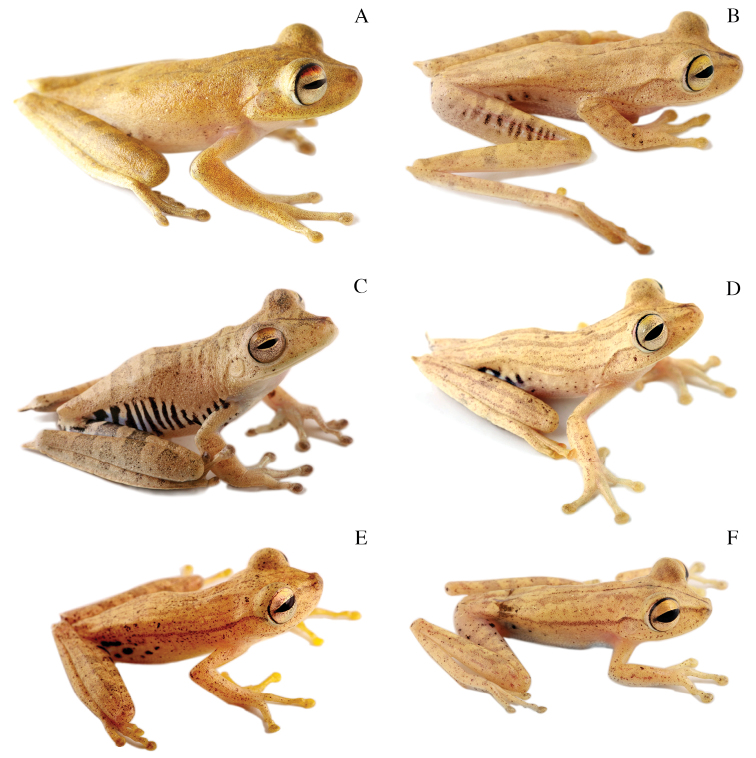
The Hypsiboas calcaratus–fasciatus species complex contains at least six species of treefrog.

=== Hybridisation ===
Natural hybridisation presents a challenge to the concept of a reproductively isolated species, as fertile hybrids permit gene flow between two populations. For example, the carrion crow Corvus corone and the hooded crow Corvus cornix appear and are classified as separate species, yet they can hybridise where their geographical ranges overlap.

Hybridisation of carrion and hooded crows permits gene flow between 'species'

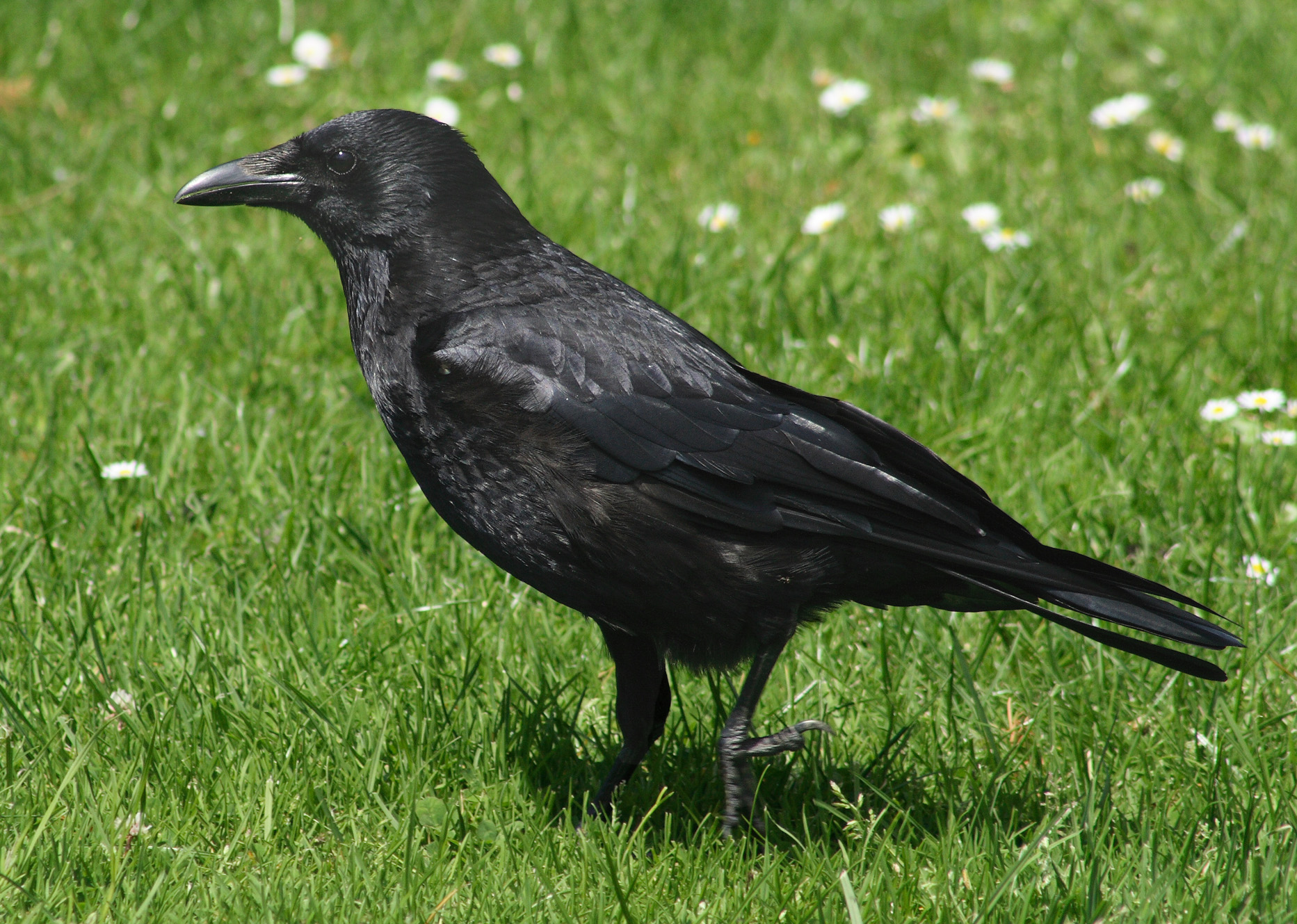
Carrion crow

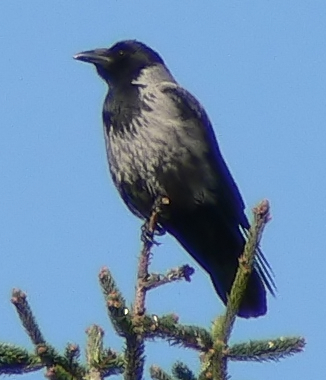
Hybrid with dark belly

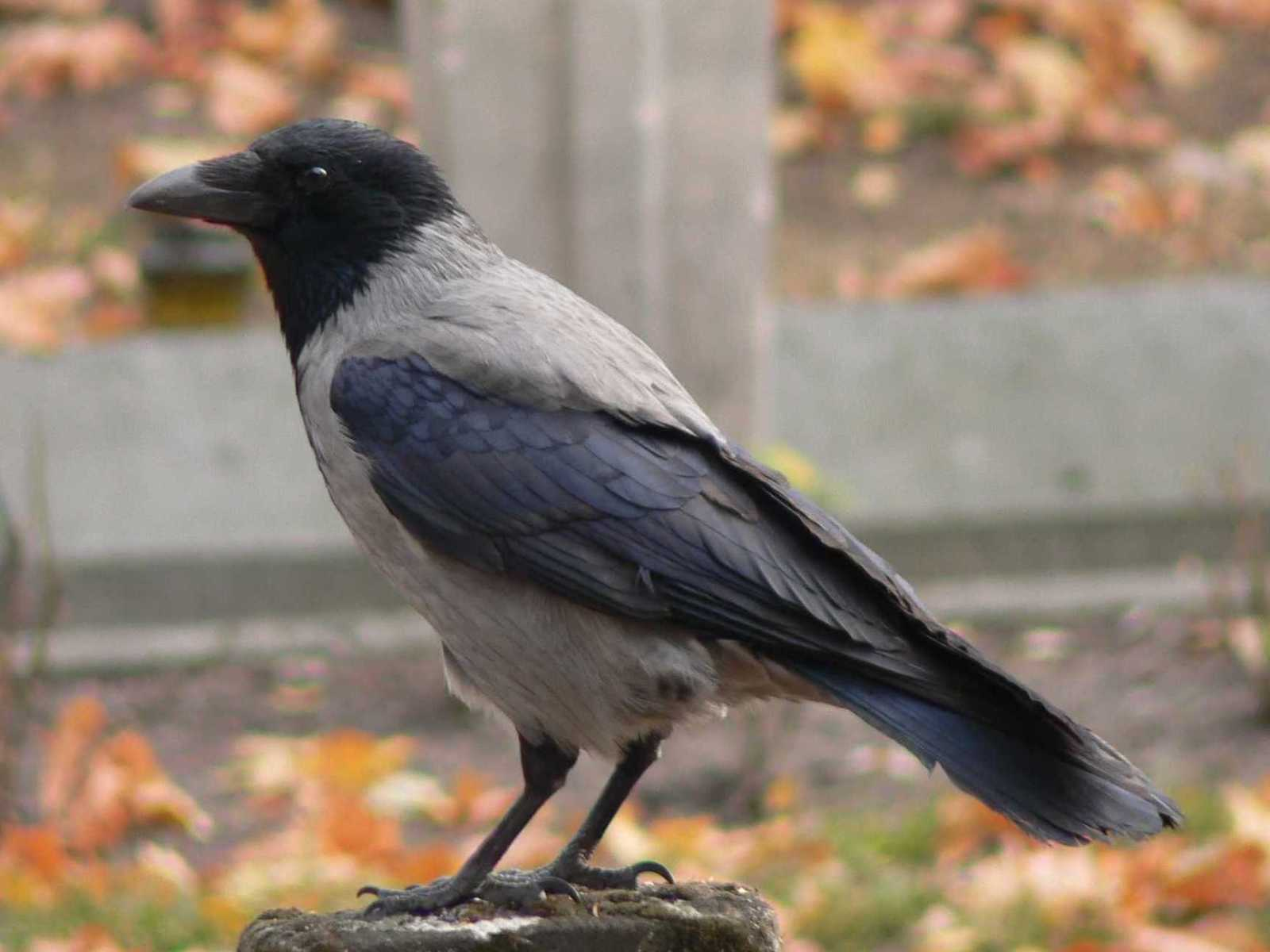
Hooded crow

=== Ring species ===
A ring species is a connected series of neighbouring populations, each of which can sexually interbreed with adjacent related populations, but for which there exist at least two "end" populations in the series, which are too distantly related to interbreed, though there is a potential gene flow between each "linked" population. Such non-breeding, though genetically connected, "end" populations may co-exist in the same region thus closing the ring. Ring species thus present a difficulty for any species concept that relies on reproductive isolation. However, ring species are at best rare. Proposed examples include the herring gull–lesser black-backed gull complex around the North pole, the Ensatina eschscholtzii group of 19 populations of salamanders in America, and the greenish warbler in Asia, but many so-called ring species have turned out to be the result of misclassification leading to questions on whether there really are any ring species.

Seven "species" of Larus gulls interbreed in a ring around the Arctic.

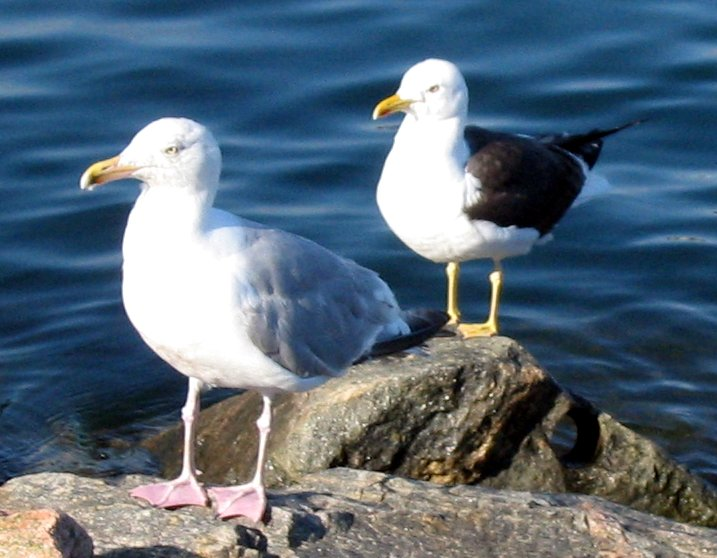
Opposite ends of the ring: a herring gull (Larus argentatus) (front) and a lesser black-backed gull (Larus fuscus) in Norway

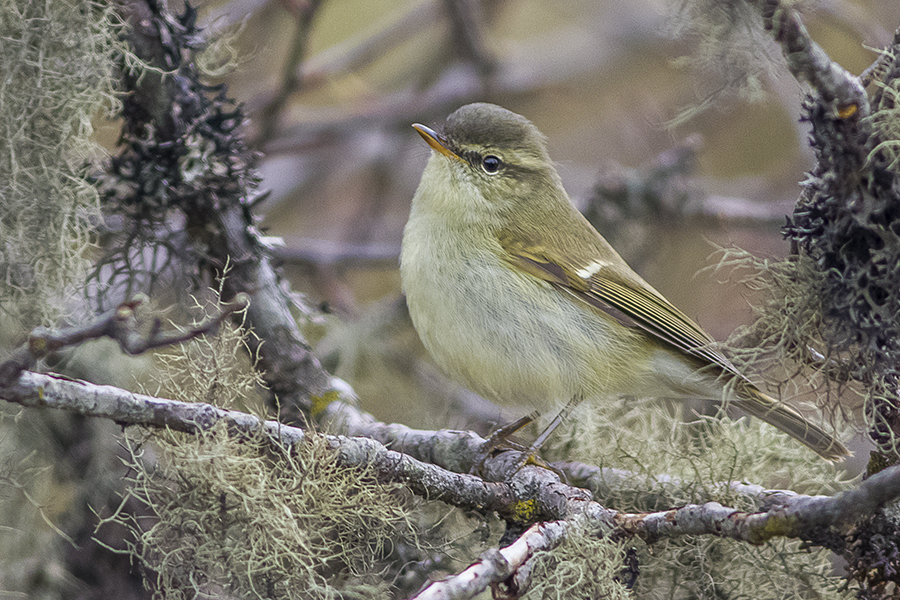
A greenish warbler, Phylloscopus trochiloides

Presumed evolution of five "species" of greenish warblers around the Himalayas

== Taxonomy and naming ==
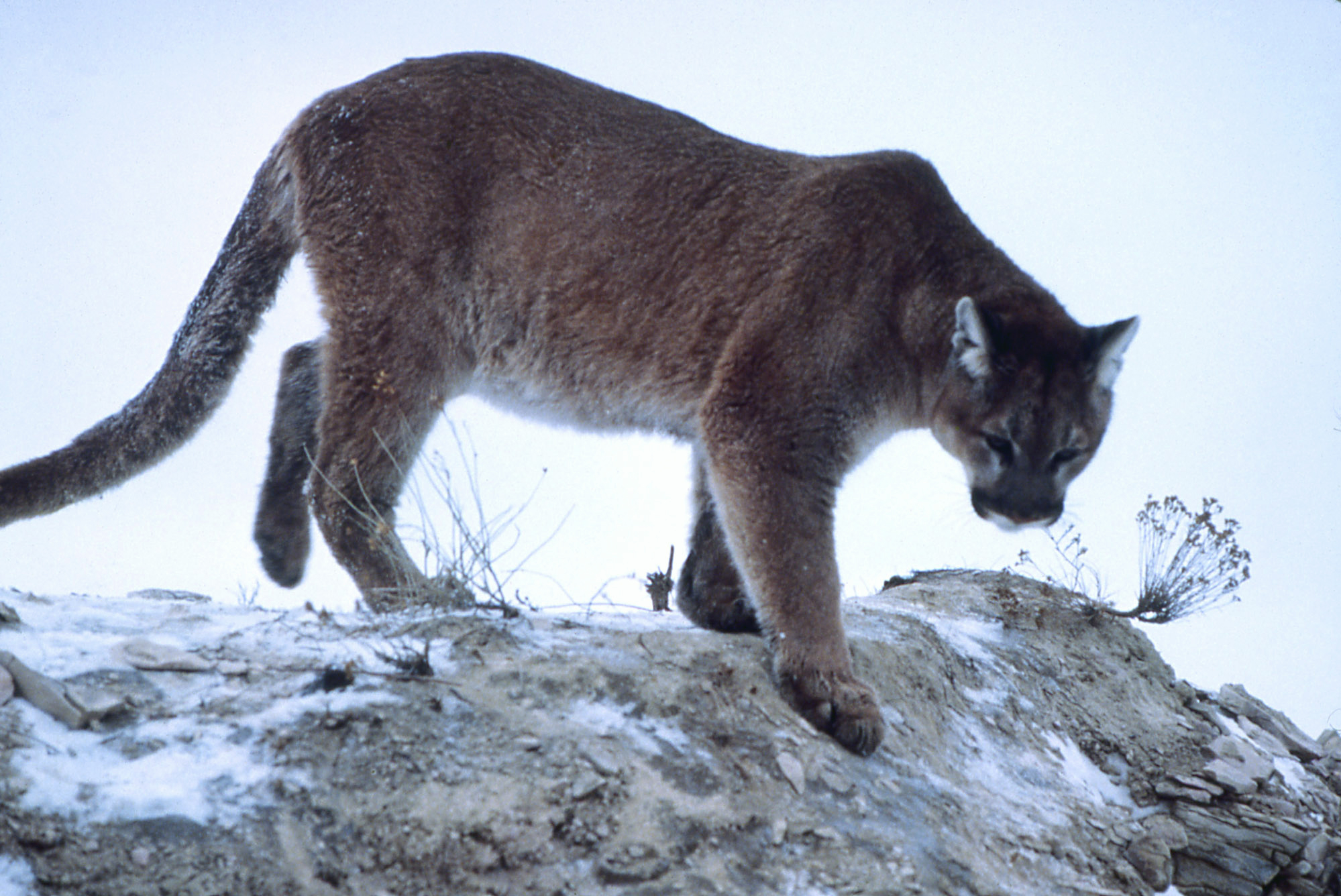
A cougar, mountain lion, panther, or puma, among other common names: its scientific name is Puma concolor.

=== Common and scientific names ===
The commonly used names for kinds of organisms are often ambiguous: "cat" could mean the domestic cat, Felis catus, or the cat family, Felidae. Another problem with common names is that they often vary from place to place, so that puma, cougar, catamount, panther, painter and mountain lion all mean Puma concolor in various parts of America, while "panther" may also mean the jaguar (Panthera onca) of Latin America or the leopard (Panthera pardus) of Africa and Asia. In contrast, the scientific names of species are chosen to be unique and universal (except for some inter-code homonyms); they are in two parts used together: the genus as in Puma, and the specific epithet as in concolor.

=== Species description ===
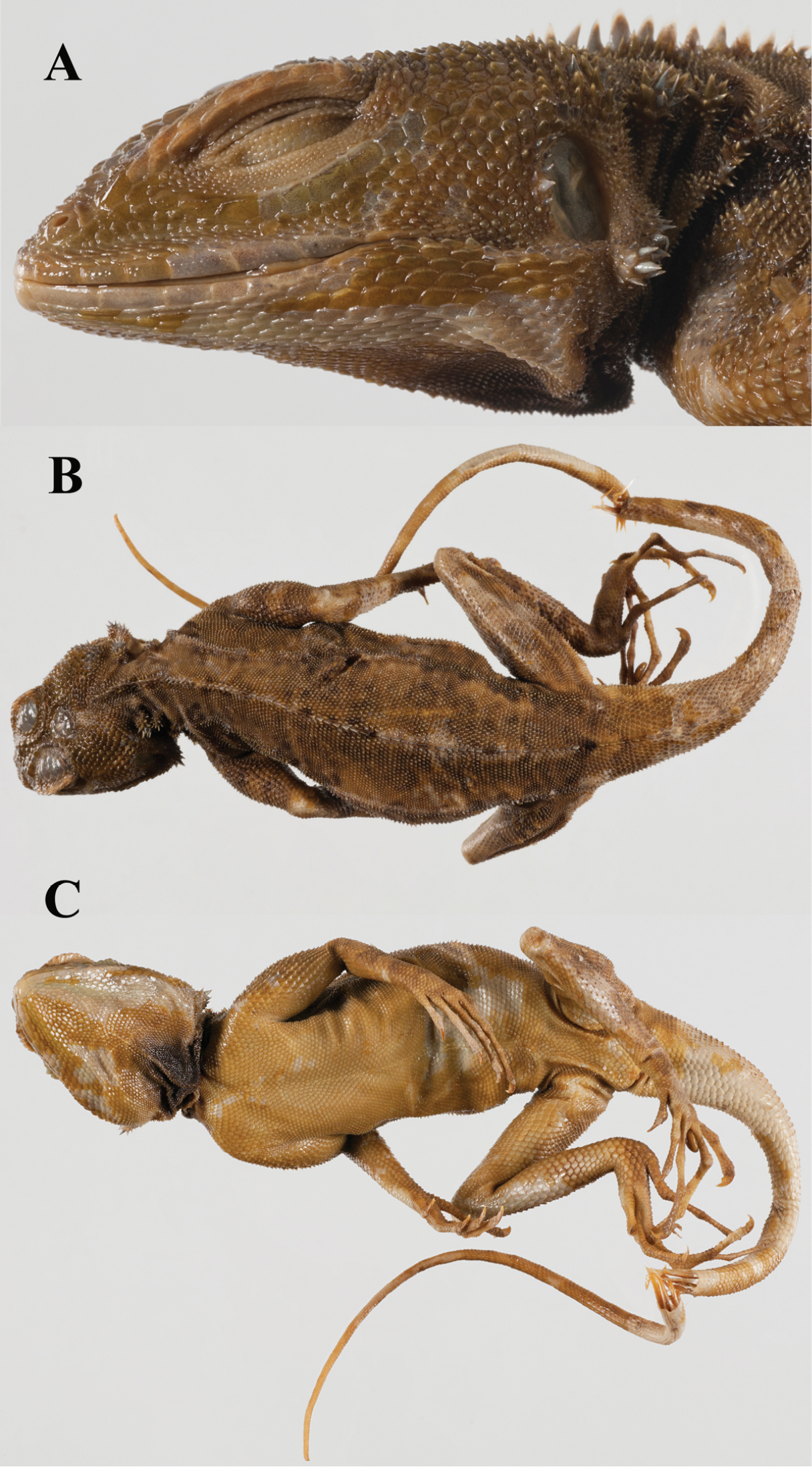
The type specimen (holotype) of Lacerta plica, described by Linnaeus in 1758

A species is given a taxonomic name when a type specimen is described formally, in a publication that assigns it a unique scientific name. The description typically provides means for identifying the new species, which may not be based solely on morphology (see cryptic species), differentiating it from other previously described and related or confusable species and provides a validly published name (in botany) or an available name (in zoology) when the paper is accepted for publication. The type material is usually held in a permanent repository, often the research collection of a major museum or university, that allows independent verification and the means to compare specimens. Describers of new species are asked to choose names that, in the words of the International Code of Zoological Nomenclature, are "appropriate, compact, euphonious, memorable, and do not cause offence".

=== Abbreviations ===
Books and articles sometimes intentionally do not identify species fully, using the abbreviation "sp." in the singular or "spp." in the plural in place of the specific name or epithet (e.g. "Canis sp."). This commonly occurs when authors are confident that some individuals belong to a particular genus but are not sure to which exact species they belong, as is common in paleontology.

Authors may also use "spp." as a short way of saying that something applies to many species within a genus, but not to all. If scientists mean that something applies to all species within a genus, they use the genus name without the specific name or epithet. The names of genera and species are usually printed in italics. However, abbreviations such as "sp." should not be italicised.

When a species' identity is not clear, a specialist may use "cf." before the epithet to indicate that confirmation is required. The abbreviations "nr." (near) or "aff." (affine) may be used when the identity is unclear but when the species appears to be similar to the species mentioned after.

=== Identification codes ===
With the rise of online databases, codes have been devised to provide identifiers for species that are already defined, including:

- National Center for Biotechnology Information (NCBI) employs a numeric 'taxid' or Taxonomy identifier, a "stable unique identifier", e.g., the taxid of Homo sapiens is 9606.
- Kyoto Encyclopedia of Genes and Genomes (KEGG) employs a three- or four-letter code for a limited number of organisms; in this code, for example, H. sapiens is simply hsa.
- UniProt employs an "organism mnemonic" of not more than five alphanumeric characters, e.g., HUMAN for H. sapiens.
- Integrated Taxonomic Information System (ITIS) provides a unique number for each species. The LSID for Homo sapiens is urn:lsid:catalogueoflife.org:taxon:4da6736d-d35f-11e6-9d3f-bc764e092680:col20170225.

=== Lumping and splitting ===
The naming of a particular species, including which genus (and higher taxa) it is placed in, is a hypothesis about the evolutionary relationships and distinguishability of that group of organisms. As further information comes to hand, the hypothesis may be corroborated or refuted. Sometimes, especially in the past when communication was more difficult, taxonomists working in isolation have given two distinct names to individual organisms later identified as the same species. When two species names are discovered to apply to the same species, the older species name is given priority and usually retained, and the newer name considered as a junior synonym, a process called synonymy. Dividing a taxon into multiple, often new, taxa is called splitting. Taxonomists are often referred to as "lumpers" or "splitters" by their colleagues, depending on their personal approach to recognising differences or commonalities between organisms. The circumscription of taxa, considered a taxonomic decision at the discretion of cognizant specialists, is not governed by the Codes of Zoological or Botanical Nomenclature, in contrast to the PhyloCode, and contrary to what is done in several other fields, in which the definitions of technical terms, like geochronological units and geopolitical entities, are explicitly delimited.

=== Broad and narrow senses ===
The nomenclatural codes that guide the naming of species, including the ICZN for animals and the ICN for plants, do not make rules for defining the boundaries of the species. Research can change the boundaries, also known as circumscription, based on new evidence. Species may then need to be distinguished by the boundary definitions used, and in such cases the names may be qualified with sensu stricto ("in the narrow sense") to denote usage in the exact meaning given by an author such as the person who named the species, while the antonym sensu lato ("in the broad sense") denotes a wider usage, for instance including other subspecies. Other abbreviations such as "auct." ("author"), and qualifiers such as "non" ("not") may be used to further clarify the sense in which the specified authors delineated or described the species.

== Change ==
Species are subject to change, whether by evolving into new species, exchanging genes with other species, merging with other species or by becoming extinct.

=== Speciation ===
The evolutionary process by which biological populations of sexually-reproducing organisms evolve to become distinct or reproductively isolated as species is called speciation. Charles Darwin was the first to describe the role of natural selection in speciation in his 1859 book The Origin of Species. Speciation depends on a measure of reproductive isolation, a reduced gene flow. This occurs most easily in allopatric speciation, where populations are separated geographically and can diverge gradually as mutations accumulate. Reproductive isolation is threatened by hybridisation, but this can be selected against once a pair of populations have incompatible alleles of the same gene, as described in the Bateson–Dobzhansky–Muller model. A different mechanism, phyletic speciation, involves one lineage gradually changing over time into a new and distinct form (a chronospecies), without increasing the number of resultant species.

=== Exchange of genes between species ===
Horizontal gene transfers between widely separated species complicate the phylogeny of bacteria.

Horizontal gene transfer between organisms of different species, either through hybridisation, antigenic shift, or reassortment, is sometimes an important source of genetic variation. Viruses can transfer genes between species. Bacteria can exchange plasmids with bacteria of other species, including some apparently distantly related ones in different phylogenetic domains, making analysis of their relationships difficult, and weakening the concept of a bacterial species.

Louis-Marie Bobay and Howard Ochman suggest, based on analysis of the genomes of many types of bacteria, that they can often be grouped "into communities that regularly swap genes", in much the same way that plants and animals can be grouped into reproductively isolated breeding populations. Bacteria may thus form species, analogous to Mayr's biological species concept, consisting of asexually reproducing populations that exchange genes by homologous recombination.

=== Extinction ===
A species is extinct when the last individual of that species dies, but it may be functionally extinct well before that moment. It is estimated that over 99 percent of all species that ever lived on Earth, some five billion species, are now extinct. Some of these were in mass extinctions such as those at the ends of the Ordovician, Devonian, Permian, Triassic and Cretaceous periods. Mass extinctions had a variety of causes including volcanic activity, climate change, and changes in oceanic and atmospheric chemistry, and they in turn had major effects on Earth's ecology, atmosphere, land surface and waters. Another form of extinction is through the assimilation of one species by another through hybridization. The resulting single species has been termed as a "compilospecies".

== Practical implications ==
Biologists and conservationists need to categorise and identify organisms in the course of their work. Difficulty assigning organisms reliably to a species constitutes a threat to the validity of research results, for example making measurements of how abundant a species is in an ecosystem moot. Surveys using a phylogenetic species concept reported 48% more species and accordingly smaller populations and ranges than those using nonphylogenetic concepts; this was termed "taxonomic inflation", which could cause a false appearance of change to the number of endangered species and consequent political and practical difficulties. Some observers claim that there is an inherent conflict between the desire to understand the processes of speciation and the need to identify and to categorise.

Conservation laws in many countries make special provisions to prevent species from going extinct. Hybridization zones between two species, one that is protected and one that is not, have sometimes led to conflicts between lawmakers, land owners and conservationists. One of the classic cases in North America is that of the protected northern spotted owl which hybridises with the unprotected California spotted owl and the barred owl; this has led to legal debates.

It has been argued, that since species are not comparable, simply counting them is not a valid measure of biodiversity; alternative measures of phylogenetic biodiversity have been proposed.

== History ==
=== Classical forms ===
In his biology, Aristotle used the term γένος (génos) to mean a kind, such as a bird or fish, and εἶδος (eidos) to mean a specific form within a kind, such as (within the birds) the crane, eagle, crow, or sparrow. These terms were translated into Latin as "genus" and "species", though they do not correspond to the Linnean terms thus named; today the birds are a class, the cranes are a family, and the crows a genus. A kind was distinguished by its attributes; for instance, a bird has feathers, a beak, wings, a hard-shelled egg, and warm blood. A form was distinguished by being shared by all its members, the young inheriting any variations they might have from their parents. Aristotle believed all kinds and forms to be distinct and unchanging. More importantly, in Aristotle's works, the terms γένος (génos) and εἶδος (eidos) are relative; a taxon that is considered an eidos in a given context can be considered a génos in another, and be further subdivided into eide (plural of eidos). His approach remained influential until the Renaissance, and still, to a lower extent, today.

=== Fixed species ===
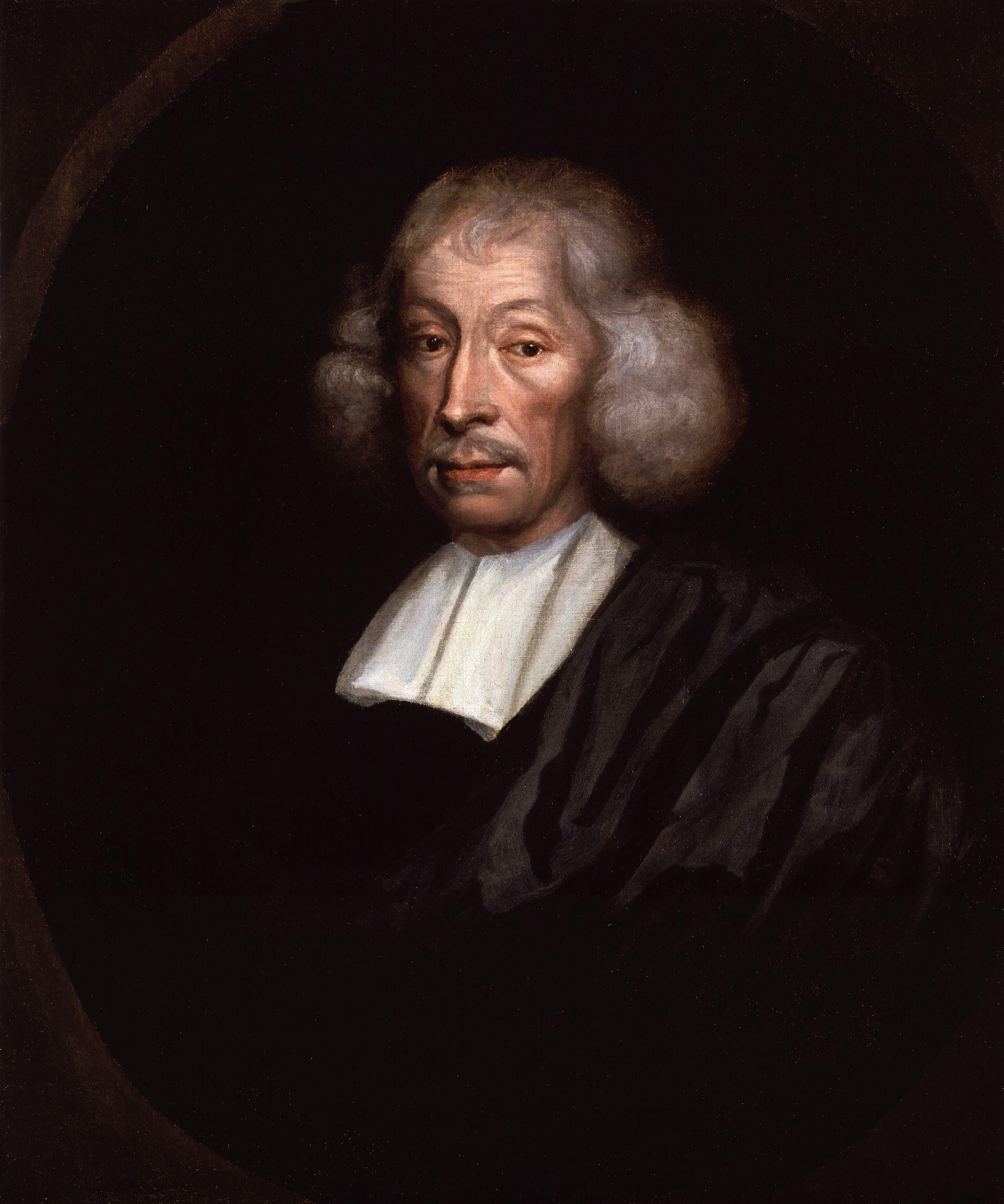
John Ray believed that species breed true and do not change, even though variations exist.

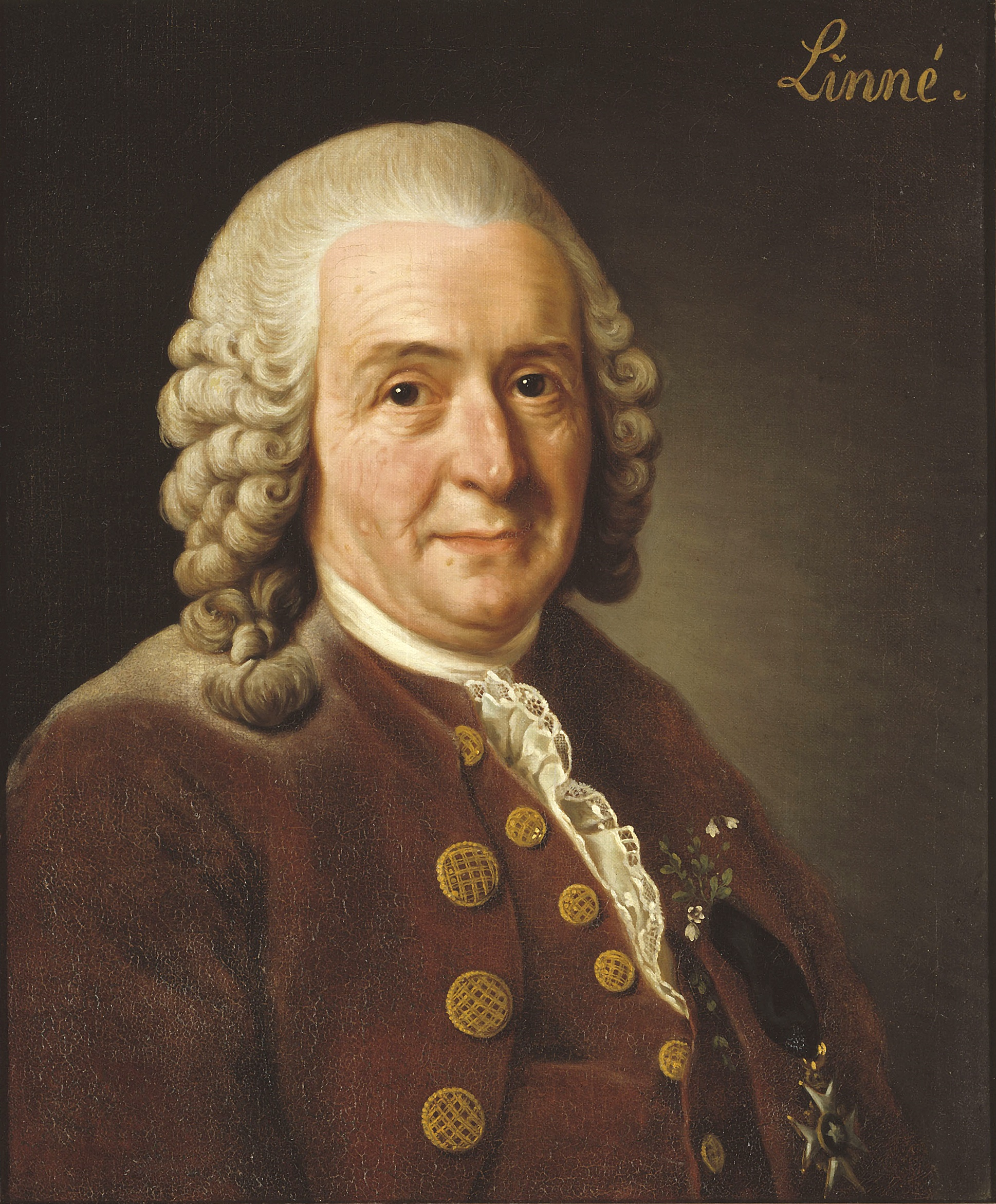
Carl Linnaeus created the binomial system for naming species.

When observers in the Early Modern period began to develop systems of organization for living things, they placed each kind of animal or plant into a context. Many of these early delineation schemes would now be considered whimsical: schemes included consanguinity based on colour (all plants with yellow flowers) or behaviour (snakes, scorpions and certain biting ants). John Ray, an English naturalist, was the first to attempt a biological definition of species in 1686, as follows:

No surer criterion for determining species has occurred to me than the distinguishing features that perpetuate themselves in propagation from seed. Thus, no matter what variations occur in the individuals or the species, if they spring from the seed of one and the same plant, they are accidental variations and not such as to distinguish a species ... Animals likewise that differ specifically preserve their distinct species permanently; one species never springs from the seed of another nor vice versa.

In the 18th century, the Swedish scientist Carl Linnaeus classified organisms according to shared physical characteristics, and not simply based upon differences. Like many contemporary systematists, he established the idea of a taxonomic hierarchy of classification based upon observable characteristics and intended to reflect natural relationships. At the time, however, it was still widely believed that there was no organic connection between species (except, possibly, between those of a given genus), no matter how similar they appeared. This view was influenced by European scholarly and religious education, which held that the taxa had been created by God, forming an Aristotelian hierarchy, the scala naturae or great chain of being. However, whether or not it was supposed to be fixed, the scala (a ladder) inherently implied the possibility of climbing.

=== Mutability ===
In viewing evidence of hybridisation, Linnaeus recognised that species were not fixed and could change; he did not consider that new species could emerge and maintained a view of divinely fixed species that may alter through processes of hybridisation or acclimatisation. By the 19th century, naturalists understood that species could change form over time, and that the history of the planet provided enough time for major changes. Jean-Baptiste Lamarck, in his 1809 Zoological Philosophy, described the transmutation of species, proposing that a species could change over time, in a radical departure from Aristotelian thinking.

In 1858, Charles Darwin and Alfred Russel Wallace provided a compelling account of evolution and the formation of new species. Darwin argued that it was populations that evolved, not individuals, by natural selection from naturally occurring variation among individuals. This required a new definition of species. Darwin concluded that species are what they appear to be: ideas, provisionally useful for naming groups of interacting individuals, writing:

I look at the term species as one arbitrarily given for the sake of convenience to a set of individuals closely resembling each other ... It does not essentially differ from the word variety, which is given to less distinct and more fluctuating forms. The term variety, again, in comparison with mere individual differences, is also applied arbitrarily, and for convenience sake.

== See also ==
- Cline
- Encyclopedia of Life
- Endangered species
- Global biodiversity
- Lists of animal species
- Lists of plant species
- Outline of zoology
- Systematics
- Speciation
- History of speciation
- Pseudospeciation
- Population (biology)
- Orthogenesis
- Adaptive radiation
- Ecotype
- Ecophenotypic variation
- Polymorphism
- Chronospecies
- Sympatric speciation
- Parapatric speciation
- Evidence for speciation by reinforcement
- Most recent common ancestor
- Hybrid speciation

== Sources ==
- Claridge, M. F.; Dawah, H. A.; Wilson, M. R., eds. (1997). Species: The Units of Biodiversity. Chapman & Hall. ISBN 978-0-412-63120-7.
- Wheeler, Quentin; Meier, Rudolf, eds. (2000). Species Concepts and Phylogenetic Theory: A Debate. Columbia University Press. ISBN 978-0-231-10143-1.
- Zachos, Frank E. (2016). Species Concepts in Biology: Historical Development, Theoretical Foundations and Practical Relevance. Springer. ISBN 978-3-319-44964-7.
