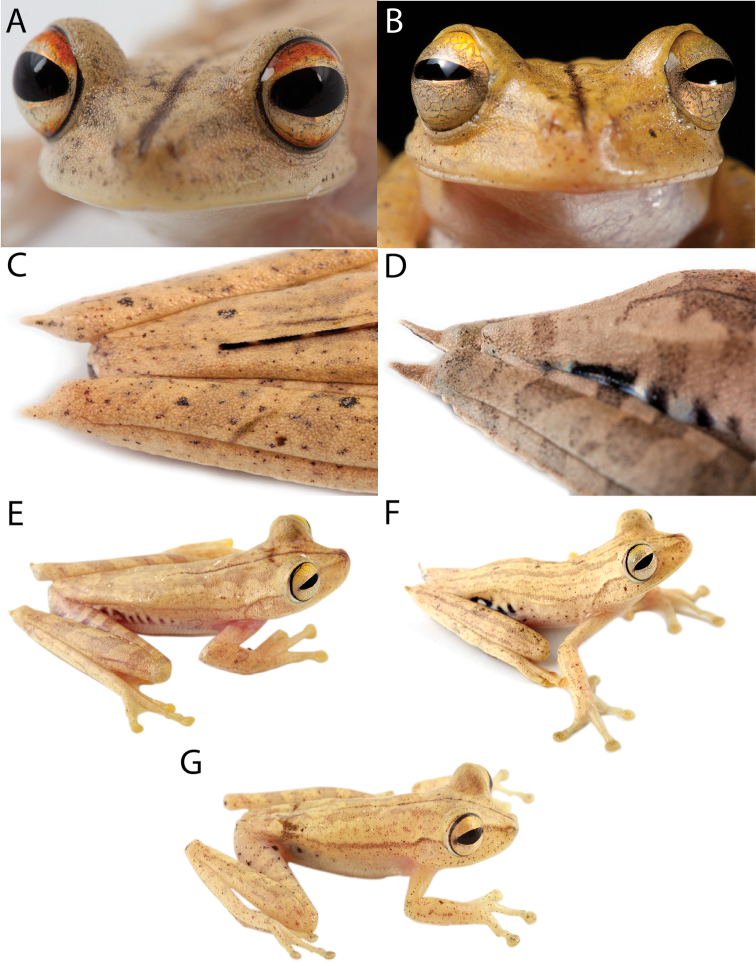

Conservation status
- Vulnerable (IUCN 3.1)

Scientific classification
- Kingdom: Animalia
- Phylum: Chordata
- Class: Amphibia
- Order: Anura
- Family: Hylidae
- Genus: Boana
- Species: B. tetete

Binomial name
- Boana tetete (Caminer and Ron, 2014)

Synonyms
- Hypsiboas tetete Caminer and Ron, 2014

= Tetete's tree frog =

Species of amphibian

Tetete's tree frog (Boana tetete) is a frog in the family Hylidae. It is endemic to Ecuador, Peru and Colombia. Scientists have seen it between 180 and 420 meters above sea level.

This frog is nocturnal. It has been observed resting on plants a few feet above flooded areas. It has large eyes and discs on its toes for climbing. For a South American tree frog, it is medium-sized.

This frog is a sister species to Boana alfaroi. It is named after the Teteté people, a group of indigenous people who lived in the Amazon until about 1970.
