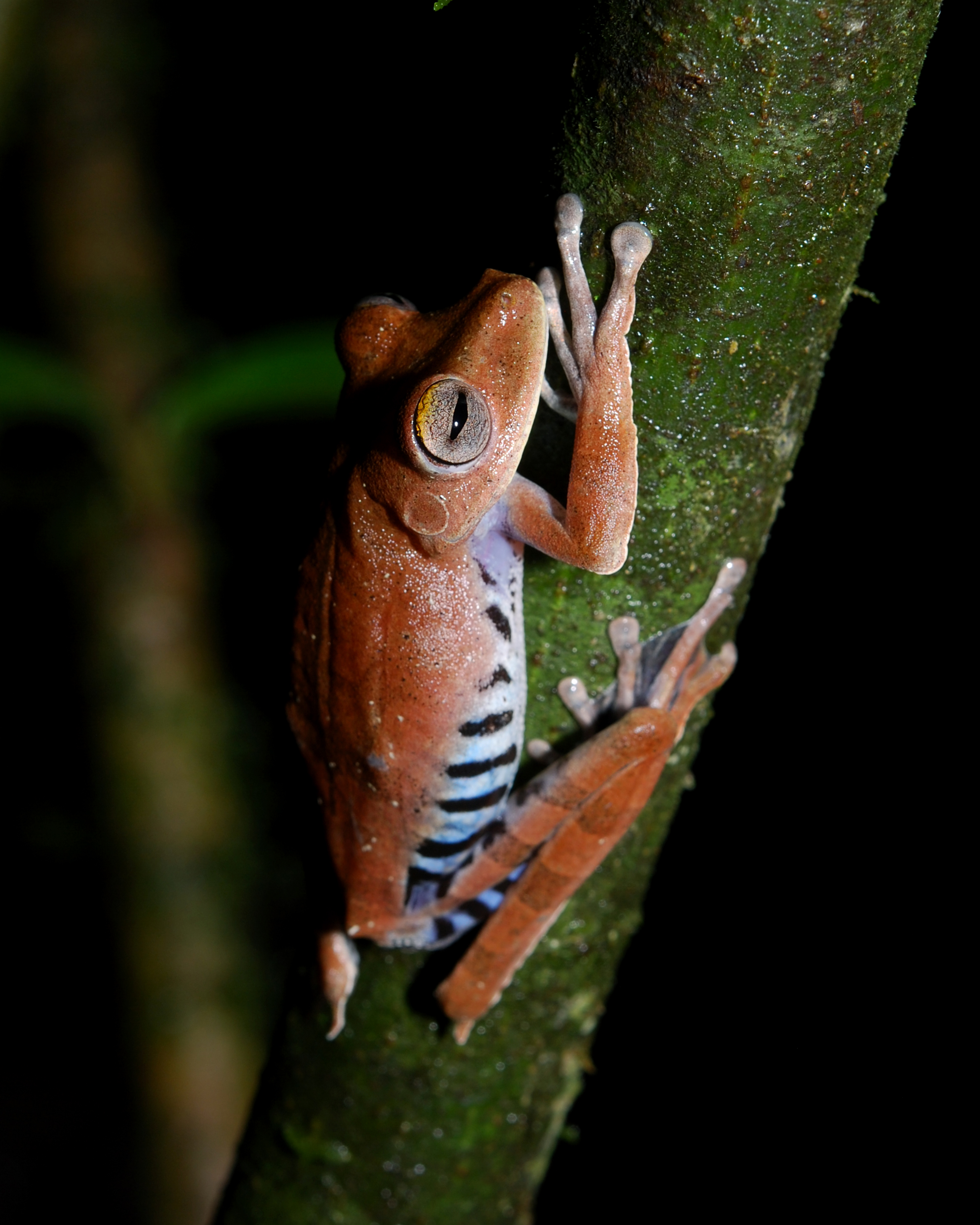
- In Yasuni National Park

Conservation status
- Least Concern (IUCN 3.1)

Scientific classification
- Kingdom: Animalia
- Phylum: Chordata
- Class: Amphibia
- Order: Anura
- Family: Hylidae
- Genus: Boana
- Species: B. calcarata

Binomial name
- Boana calcarata (Troschel, 1848)

Synonyms
- Hyla calcarata Troschel, 1848; Boana calcarata (Troschel, 1848); Hyla leptoscelis Boulenger, 1918; Hypsiboas calcaratus (Troschel, 1848)

= Troschel's tree frog =

Species of amphibian

Troschel's treefrog (Boana calcarata), also known as the blue-flanked treefrog or the convict treefrog, is a species of frog in the family Hylidae. It is found in most parts of the Amazon Basin including Suriname. Colombian, Guianan and Venezuelan records need confirmation.

== Taxonomy ==
This species was originally described by Franz Hermann Troschel as Hyla calcarata in 1848. After Edward Drinker Cope transferred it to the genus Hypsiboas as Hypsiboas calcaratus in 1867, it was variously recognized with either name until Faivovich and colleagues validated Hypsiboas in 2005. However, in 2017 Alain Dubois showed that Hypsiboas was a junior synonym of Boana, the latter then being the valid name. Many sources, however, still use the old name.

== Description ==
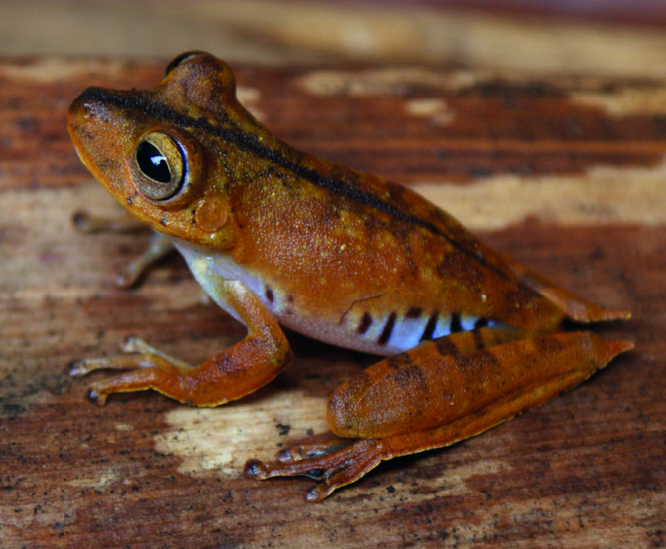
Amapá, Brazil

Adult males measure 28–43 mm (1.1–1.7 in) and adult females 46–56 mm (1.8–2.2 in) in snout–vent length. The fingers have only basal webbing while the toes are webbed. Males have pre-pollical spines. The dorsal coloration varies from light brown to reddish brown or brown. There is a dark brown middorsal line, and some specimens have brown diffuse transversal bands. The limbs bear pale brown transversal bars dorsally. Scattered minute white and black dots, or large dark brown blotches, might be present on the dorsum. The flanks are white, light blue or blue and have dark brown vertical bars. The venter is creamy white and the belly is yellowish white.

== Habitat and conservation ==
This species occurs in tropical rainforest at elevations up to 1,000 m (3,300 ft) above sea level, but mostly below 400 m (1,300 ft). It is an arboreal frog. During the rainy season, adults can be seen perched on stems and small branches above slow-moving streams. The eggs are deposited in water where the larvae will then develop. Habitat loss associated with forest conversion, logging, clear cutting, and fire is a threat to this species. However, it is abundant in parts of its range, is present in protected areas, and is not threatened overall.

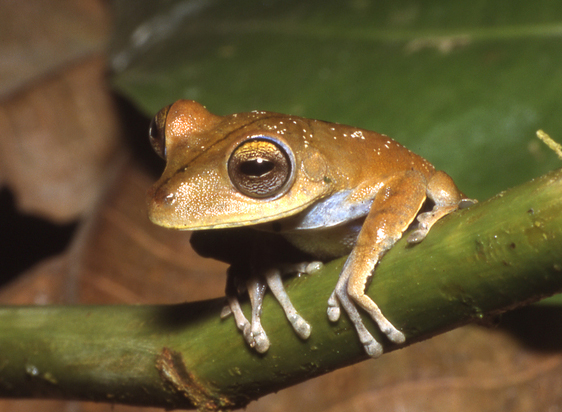
