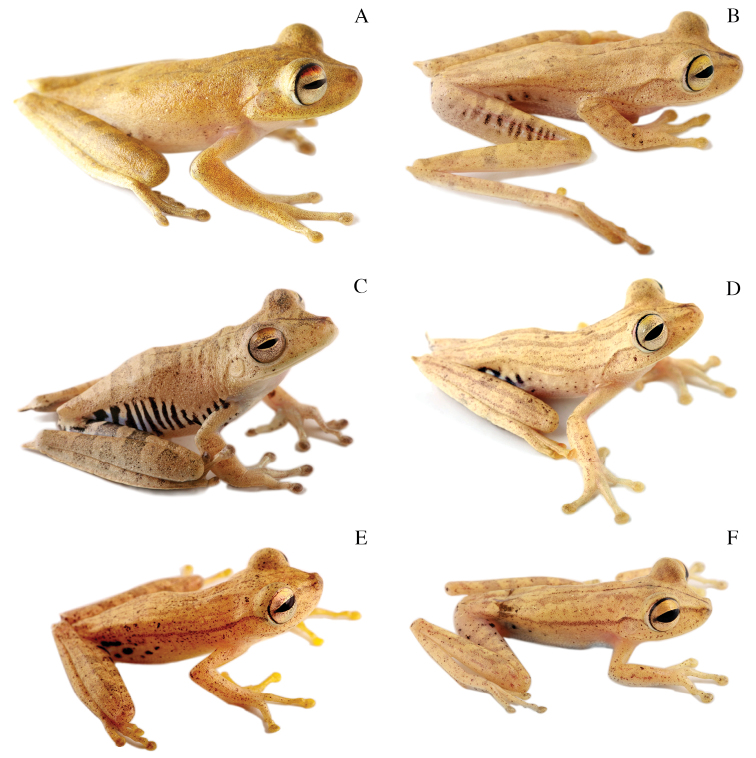

Scientific classification
- Kingdom: Animalia
- Phylum: Chordata
- Class: Amphibia
- Order: Anura
- Family: Hylidae
- Genus: Boana
- Species: B. alfaroi

Binomial name
- Boana alfaroi (Caminer and Ron, 2014)

Synonyms
- Hypsiboas alfaroi Caminer and Ron, 2014

= Alfaro's tree frog =

Species of frog

Alfaro's tree frog (Boana alfaroi) is a frog in the family Hylidae. It is endemic to Brazil, Ecuador, and Colombia. Scientists think it may also live in Peru. Scientists have seen it between 176 and 350 meters above sea level.

This is a medium-sized tree frog with large eyes. The adult male frog measures 27.9 to 36.3 mm long in snout-vent length and the adult female frog 39.7 to 49.2 mm. It has especially wide discs on its toes for climbing. The skin on its back is the color of light coffee.

This frog lives in tropical rainforests. It is nocturnal.

This frog is named after former President of Ecuador Eloy Alfaro Delgado.
