= Paralongicollum =

Scientific classification
- Kingdom: Animalia
- Phylum: Acanthocephala
- Class: Palaeacanthocephala
- Order: Echinorhynchida
- Family: Pomphorhynchidae
- Genus: Paralongicollum; Amin, Bauer & Sidorov, 1991

Genus of parasitic worms

Paralongicollum is a genus in Acanthocephala, the thorny-headed worms, also known as spiny-headed worms.

== Taxonomy ==
The genus was described by Amin, Bauer & Sidorov, 1991. The National Center for Biotechnology Information does not indicate that any phylogenetic analysis has been published on any Paralongicollum species that would confirm its position as a unique order in the family Pomphorhynchidae.

== Description ==
Paralongicollum species consist of a proboscis covered in hooks and a trunk.

== Species ==
The genus Paralongicollum contains three species.

- Paralongicollum edmondsi (Golvan, 1969) (Note: A binomial authority in parentheses indicates that the species was originally described in a genus other than Paralongicollum . It was originally described as Longicollum edmondsi by Golvan in 1969 before taking its current name in 2022 by Smales.)
- Paralongicollum nemacheili Amin, Bauer & Sidorov, 1991
- Paralongicollum sergenti (Choquette & Gayot, 1952) (Note: A binomial authority in parentheses indicates that the species was originally described in a genus other than Paralongicollum . It was originally described as Tenuiproboscis sergenti by Choquette and Gayot in 1952 and then renamed to Longicollum sergenti by Golvan in 1969 before taking its current name in 1991 by Amin, Bauer & Sidorov, 1991)

== Distribution ==
The distribution of Paralongicollum is determined by that of its hosts.

== Hosts ==
Life cycle of Acanthocephala. (Note: There are no known aberrant human infections for Paralongicollum species.)

The life cycle of an acanthocephalan consists of three stages beginning when an infective acanthor (development of an egg) is released from the intestines of the definitive host and then ingested by an arthropod, the intermediate host. Although the intermediate hosts of Paralongicollum are arthropods. When the acanthor molts, the second stage called the acanthella begins. This stage involves penetrating the wall of the mesenteron or the intestine of the intermediate host and growing. The final stage is the infective cystacanth which is the larval or juvenile state of an Acanthocephalan, differing from the adult only in size and stage of sexual development. The cystacanths within the intermediate hosts are consumed by the definitive host, usually attaching to the walls of the intestines, and as adults they reproduce sexually in the intestines. The acanthor is passed in the feces of the definitive host and the cycle repeats. There may be paratenic hosts (hosts where parasites infest but do not undergo larval development or sexual reproduction) for Paralongicollum.

Paralongicollum parasitizes animals. There are no reported cases of Paralongicollum infesting humans in the English language medical literature. P. sergenti might be a vector for another parasite in humans.

Hosts for Paralongicollum species

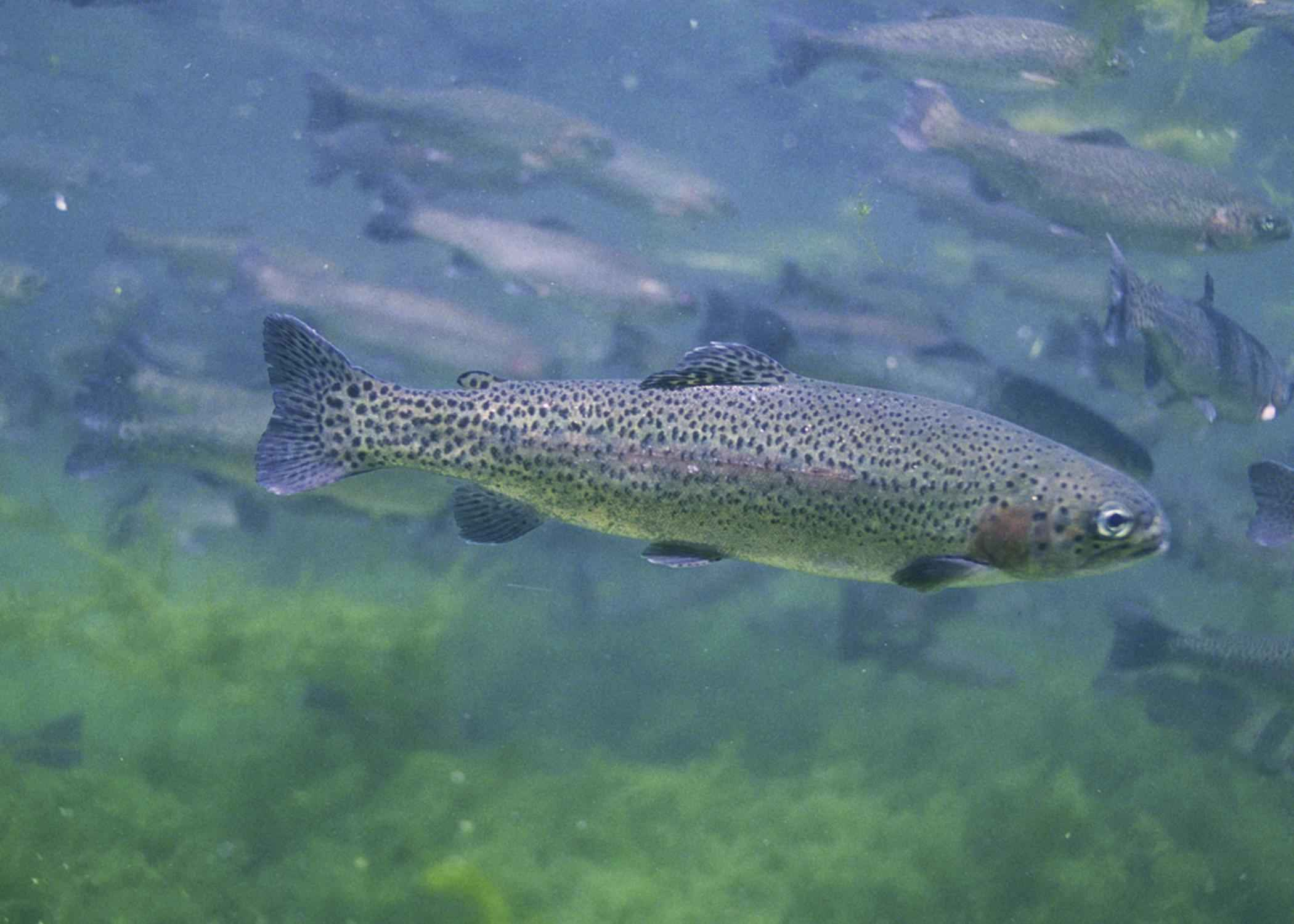
The Rainbow trout is a host for P. nemacheili.

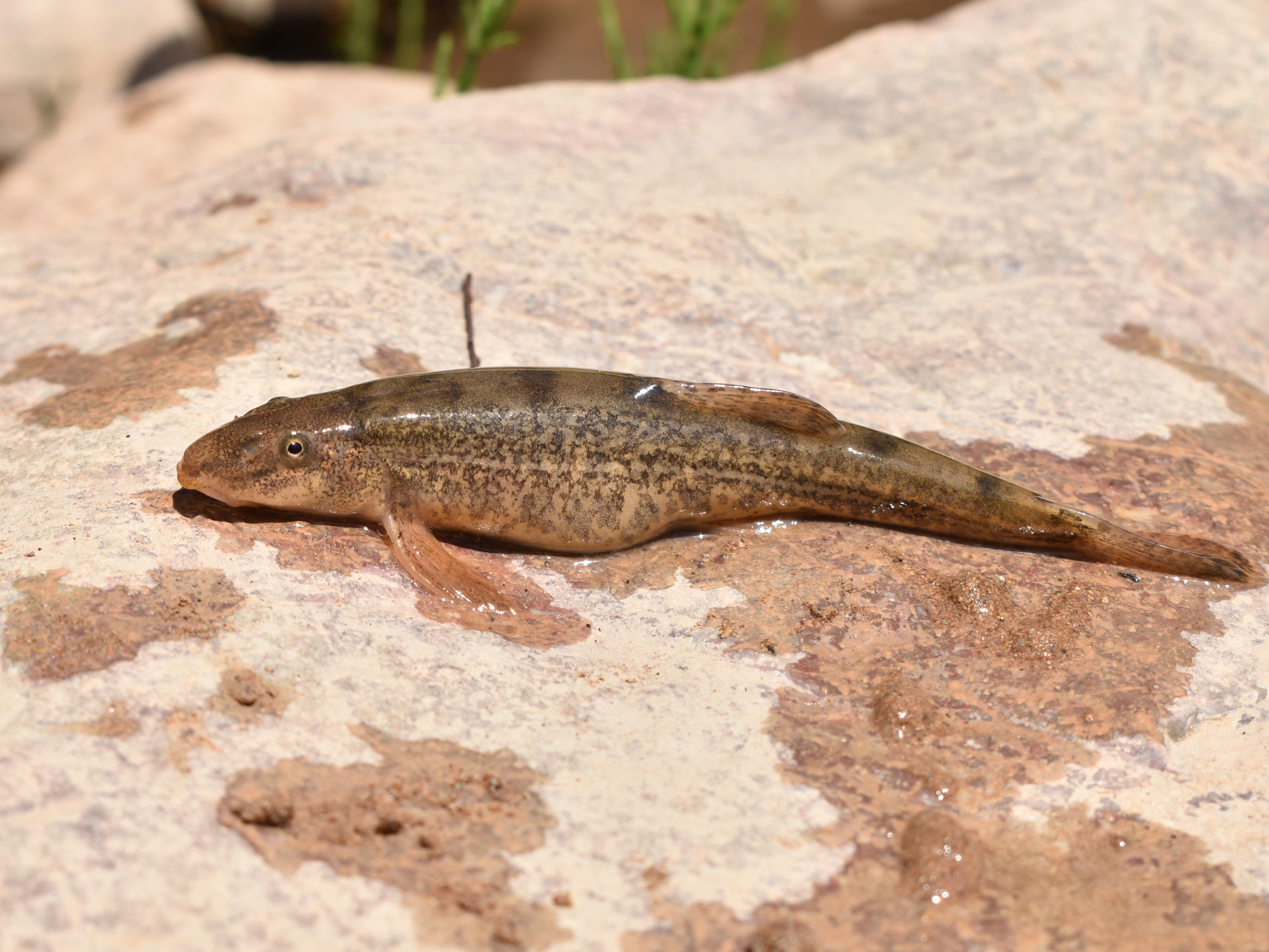
The Tibetan stone loach is a host for P. nemacheili.
