= Rhadinorhynchus mariserpentis =

Scientific classification
- Domain: Eukaryota
- Kingdom: Animalia
- Phylum: Acanthocephala
- Class: Palaeacanthocephala
- Order: Echinorhynchida
- Family: Rhadinorhynchidae
- Genus: Rhadinorhynchus
- Species: R. mariserpentis

Binomial name
- Rhadinorhynchus mariserpentis (Steinauer, Garcia-Vedrenne, Weinstein & Kuris, 2019) Huston, Cribb & Smales, 2020

Synonyms
- Gymnorhadinorhynchus mariserpentis Steinauer, Garcia-Vedrenne, Weinstein & Kuris, 2019

Species of thorny-headed worm

Rhadinorhynchus mariserpentis is a species of parasitic thorny-headed worm within the family Rhadinorhynchidae. The species is a endoparasite of Regalecus russeli, with the type locality coming from an intestine of an individual collected in the Sea of Japan off the coasts of northern Kyushu.
