= Pomphorhynchus laevis =

Scientific classification
- Kingdom: Animalia
- Phylum: Acanthocephala
- Class: Palaeacanthocephala
- Order: Echinorhynchida
- Family: Pomphorhynchidae
- Genus: Pomphorhynchus
- Species: P. laevis

Binomial name
- Pomphorhynchus laevis Müller, 1776

Species of thorny-headed worm

Pomphorhynchus laevis is an endo-parasitic acanthocephalan worm, with a complex life cycle, that can modify the behaviour of its intermediate host, the freshwater amphipod Gammarus pulex. P. laevis does not contain a digestive tract and relies on the nutrients provided by its host species. In the fish host this can lead to the accumulation of lead in P. laevis by feeding on the bile of the host species.

== Life cycle and host species ==
Pomphorhynchus laevis is a parasite with a complex life cycle, meaning that it needs multiple host species to complete it. The female releases eggs containing acanthor that are then ingested by an arthropod. The acanthor is then released from the egg and becomes acanthella which penetrate the host's gut wall and transforms into the infective cystacanth stage which presents as a cyst. The larval stages (cystacanths) reside in the hemocoel of the intermediate host, gammarids. From them the parasite is trophically transmitted to fish. Several fish species can serve as the definitive host, in which P. laevis infect the intestine. In the fish host, bile is an important resource for the growth of P. laevis.

=== Host species ===
In the wild, P. laevis is known to infect a range of fish species from several families as definitive hosts. The preferred final hosts of P. laevis are the chub and barbel when in freshwater, and the minnow when in an isolated body of water. Other definitive hosts include the gudgeon, roach, vairone, nase, rudd, common dace, loach, catfish, perch, bullhead, three-spined stickleback, brown trout and round goby.

=== Location of infection ===
Infection in the fish host is in the posterior part of the middle intestine, more specifically behind the pyloric caeca. Immature P. laevis are mainly found in the proximal part of the digestive tract while mature and developing P. laevis are found near the first intestinal loop with the posterior third loop of the digestive tract being uninhabitable.

== Ecology ==
A positive association between fish biomass density and P. laevis abundance has been observed, suggesting the parasite populations increase in hosts with age, and that there is limited impact of intra-host density on parasite settlement.

=== Environmental impacts on ecology ===
==== Pollution ====
In intermediate Gammarus hosts, infection leads to increased resistance against at least some insecticides. This potentially impacts the reliability of such hosts as bioindicators. In a follow-up field and laboratory investigation, acanthocephalan parasites were shown to accumulate organic micropollutants at concentrations up to 35-fold higher than their Gammarus hosts. By acting as pollutant sinks and reducing the contaminant burden in infected amphipods, the parasites may further enhance host tolerance to polluted environments.

In the definitive fish host, P. laevis can reduce concentrations of metals (such as arsenic, cadmium, copper, lead, and zinc) by absorption through the host's bile. They thereby reduce heavy metal concentrations in the host bile. Consequently, P. laevis is a potential indicator of pollution.

==== Temperature ====
The infection success of acanthors emerging from eggs to Gammarus pulex is not affected by temperature, but developmental rate is increased at warmer temperatures (14 versus 17 °C). At the same temperatures parasite infection reduces survival of these hosts, but this is not compounded by temperature.

== Host manipulation ==
=== Intermediate host ===
Pomphorhynchus laevis facilitates its transmission from the intermediate to the definitive host by altering the behaviour and visual appearance of its gammarid intermediate hosts.

==== Manipulation of appearance ====
At the same time, the parasites itself develops a bright orange colour making it more visible and consequently more likely to be consumed by a fish host. This visual manipulation is effective specifically on host species that can serve as suitable hosts as fish species that are not suitable hosts are less attracted.

==== Manipulation of behaviour ====
Infected gammarids are made to develop a preference for fish odours and responses to light.

Pomphorhynchus laevis can change the response of Gammarus pulex to light (phototaxis). Uninfected, healthy individuals of G. pulex show strong light avoidance (photophobic behaviour). This helps to avoid predation. In G. pulex infected with P laevis this behaviour is reversed, they seek out light: they become photophilic. This increases the chance of predation, in turn increasing the likelihood of parasite transmission. This alteration in behaviour in response to light involves an alteration in serotonergic activity of the brain. The immunoreactivity of the brain to serotonin increases by approximately 40 percent in infected G. pulex when compared to uninfected counterparts. In the related species G. roeseli P. laevis infection does not elicit this behaviour change.

It is also shown that G. pulex infected with the infective larval stage (cystacanths) of P. laevis, are less likely to show behaviours that would normally allow them to avoid predation. These behaviours include using refuge less frequently, being less likely to cluster together when in the presence of danger, and frequently clinging to things floating in the water. When G. pulex are infected by the non-infective life stage of P. laevis, there is an increased use of refuge which in turn decreases the risk of predation which is advantageous to the parasite due to them not being able to infect the next host when in this life stage.

==== Manipulation of feeding and metabolism ====
In the same host food presence does not appear to affect time and intensity of infection, while low food availability does negatively affect host growth. Possibly due to reduced metabolic rate of the host.

==== Manipulation of immune response ====
After invading the host P. laevis needs to deal with their host's immune system. Levels of phenoloxidase and total immune activity were significantly reduced in infected G. pulex compared to controls. This led to a positive effect on bacterial growth in the host, which may a negative affect gammarid health and consequently infecting P. laevis.

=== Definitive hosts ===
P. laevis excretes several neurochemicals in the gut of the fish hosts. It thus appears likely that the parasites alters the physiological functioning of its host's alimentary tract .

== Biomimetics ==
This worm swells its proboscis to press microneedles into the intestinal wall, with a very strong adhesive force. This has inspired a structural skin graft adhesive that sticks strongly but has minimal tissue damage while in place and upon removal.
