= Golvanacanthus =

Scientific classification
- Kingdom: Animalia
- Phylum: Acanthocephala
- Class: Palaeacanthocephala
- Order: Echinorhynchida
- Family: Rhadinorhynchidae
- Subfamily: Golvanacanthinae
- Genus: Golvanacanthus; Paggi and Orecchia, 1972
- Species: G. blennii

Binomial name
- Golvanacanthus blennii Paggi and Orecchia, 1972

Genus of parasitic worms

Golvanacanthus is a monotypic genus of acanthocephalans (thorny-headed or spiny-headed parasitic worms) containing a single species, Golvanacanthus blennii, that infests animals.

== Taxonomy ==
The species was described by Paggi and Orecchia in 1972. Golvanacanthus differs from other genera in the family Rhadinorhynchidae by the presence of cuticular spines that are distributed from the anterior to the posterior end of the body. The National Center for Biotechnology Information does not indicate that any phylogenetic analysis has been published on Golvanacanthus that would confirm its position as a unique order in the family Rhadinorhynchidae.

== Description ==
G. blennii consists of a proboscis covered in hooks and a trunk.

== Distribution ==
The distribution of G. blennii is determined by that of its hosts. It was found in the Gulf of Gaeta, Italy.

== Hosts ==
Life cycle of Acanthocephala. (Note: There are no known aberrant human infections for G. blennii.)

The life cycle of an acanthocephalan consists of three stages beginning when an infective acanthor (development of an egg) is released from the intestines of the definitive host and then ingested by an arthropod, the intermediate host. Although the intermediate hosts of Golvanacanthus are arthorpods. When the acanthor molts, the second stage called the acanthella begins. This stage involves penetrating the wall of the mesenteron or the intestine of the intermediate host and growing. The final stage is the infective cystacanth which is the larval or juvenile state of an Acanthocephalan, differing from the adult only in size and stage of sexual development. The cystacanths within the intermediate hosts are consumed by the definitive host, usually attaching to the walls of the intestines, and as adults they reproduce sexually in the intestines. The acanthor is passed in the feces of the definitive host and the cycle repeats. There may be paratenic hosts (hosts where parasites infest but do not undergo larval development or sexual reproduction) for Golvanacanthus.

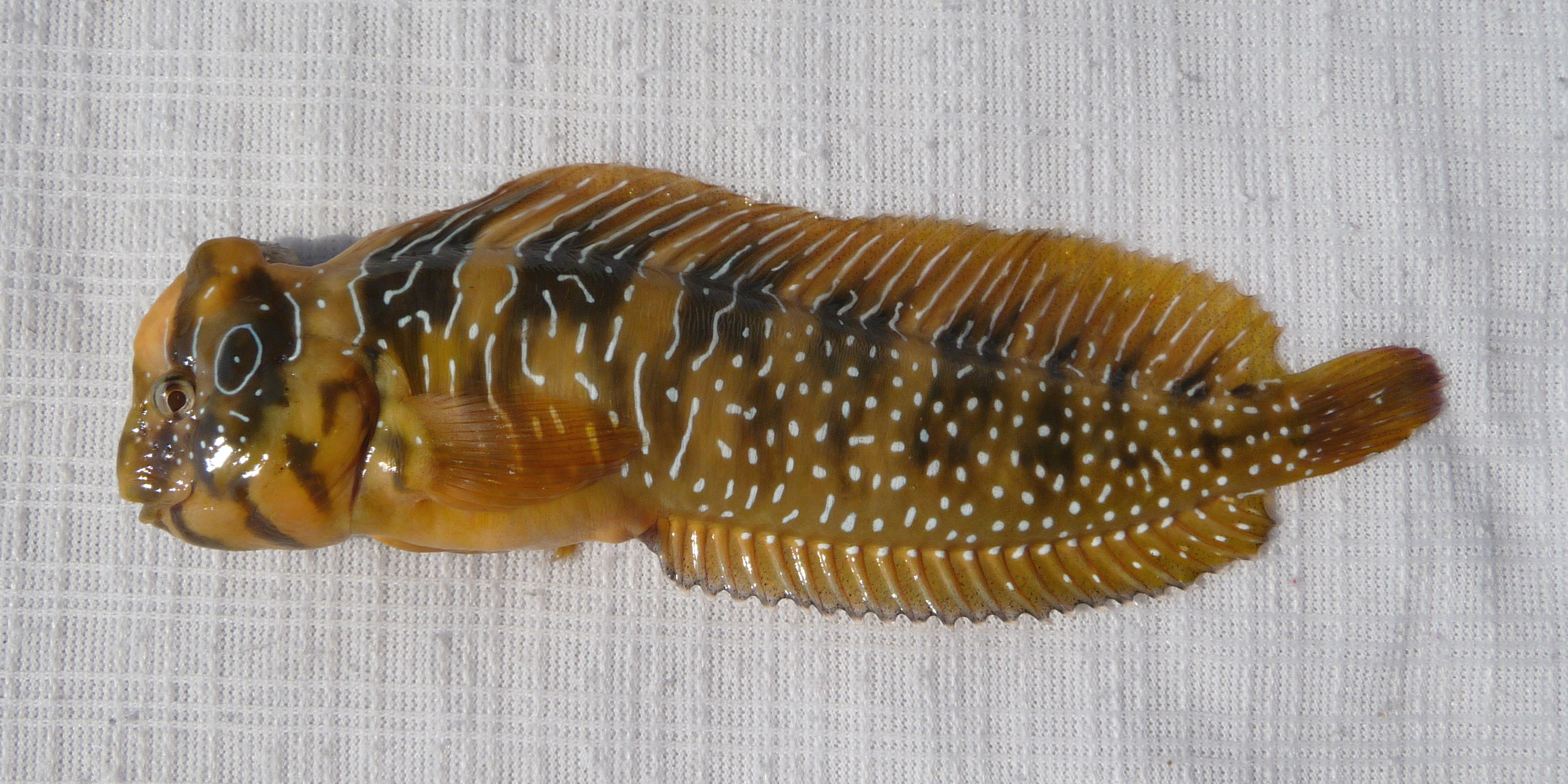
The peacock blenny is a hosts for G. blennii

G. blennii parasitizes the Peacock blenny (Salaria pavo,). There are no reported cases of G. blennii infesting humans in the English language medical literature.
