= Cathayacanthus =

Scientific classification
- Kingdom: Animalia
- Phylum: Acanthocephala
- Class: Palaeacanthocephala
- Order: Echinorhynchida
- Family: Rhadinorhynchidae
- Genus: Cathayacanthus; Golvan, 1969

Genus of worms

Cathayacanthus is a genus in Acanthocephala (thorny-headed worms, also known as spiny-headed worms).

== Taxonomy ==
The genus was described by Golvan in 1969 when he moved Rhadinorhynchus exilis Van Cleave, 1928 to a new genus he called Cathayacanthus as it did not have large specialized basal proboscis hooks that are a distinguishing feature of the species in Rhadinorhynchus. The National Center for Biotechnology Information does not indicate that any phylogenetic analysis has been published on any Cathayacanthus species that would confirm its position as a unique order in the class Rhadinorhynchidae. The species Cathayacanthus bagarii Moravec & Sey, 1989 was removed from the genus due to the presence of four tubular cement glands.

== Species ==
The genus Cathayacanthus contains two species:

- Cathayacanthus exilis (Van Cleave, 1928)
- Cathayacanthus spinitruncatus Amin, Heckmann & Van Ha 2014

C. spinitruncatus was found infesting the Common ponyfish (Leiognathus equulus) in Hai Phong and Nha Trang in Vietnam and from the Yellowspotted ponyfish (Nuchequula flavaxilla) in Quang Ninh in the Pacific Ocean off the coast of Vietnam. Females are larger and have more and larger proboscis hooks and trunk spines than males. In the female, the proboscis receptacle is only about one fifth the length of the trunk whereas in the male, the proboscis receptacle is more than half the length of the trunk and contains a cephalic ganglion at its anterior end. The male reproductive structures are in the posterior fifth of the trunk and with six club-shaped cement glands (used to temporarily close the posterior end of the female after copulation) gradually merging into six separate cement gland ducts.

== Distribution ==
The distribution of Cathayacanthus is determined by that of its hosts.

== Hosts ==
Life cycle of Acanthocephala. (Note: There are no known aberrant human infections for Cathayacanthus species.)

The life cycle of an acanthocephalan consists of three stages, beginning when an infective acanthor (development of an egg) is released from the intestines of the definitive host and then ingested by an arthropod, the intermediate host. Although the intermediate hosts of Cathayacanthus are arthropods. When the acanthor molts, the second stage called the acanthella begins. This stage involves penetrating the wall of the mesenteron or the intestine of the intermediate host and growing. The final stage is the infective cystacanth which is the larval or juvenile state of an Acanthocephalan, differing from the adult only in size and stage of sexual development. The cystacanths within the intermediate hosts are consumed by the definitive host, usually attaching to the walls of the intestines, and as adults they reproduce sexually in the intestines. The acanthor is passed in the feces of the definitive host and the cycle repeats. There may be paratenic hosts (hosts where parasites infest but do not undergo larval development or sexual reproduction) for Cathayacanthus.

Cathayacanthus parasitizes fish. There are no reported cases of Cathayacanthus infesting humans in the English language medical literature.
