= Raorhynchus =

Scientific classification
- Domain: Eukaryota
- Kingdom: Animalia
- Phylum: Rotifera
- Class: Palaeacanthocephala
- Order: Echinorhynchida
- Family: Rhadinorhynchidae
- Genus: Raorhynchus; Tripathi, 1956

Genus of worms

Raorhynchus is a genus of worms belonging to the family Rhadinorhynchidae.

The species of this genus are found in almost all world oceans.

Species:

- Raorhynchus cadenati Gupta & Gunjan-Sinh, 1992
- Raorhynchus guptai Gupta & Kumar, 1987
- Raorhynchus inexspectatus Golvan, 1969
- Raorhynchus megalaspisi Wang, Wang & Wu, 1993
- Raorhynchus meyeri (Heinze, 1934)
- Raorhynchus polynemi Tripathi, 1956
- Raorhynchus schmidti George & Nadakal, 1978
- Raorhynchus terebra (Rudolphi, 1819)
- Raorhynchus thapari Gupta & Fatma, 1981
