= Micracanthorhynchina =

Scientific classification
- Kingdom: Animalia
- Phylum: Acanthocephala
- Class: Palaeacanthocephala
- Order: Echinorhynchida
- Family: Rhadinorhynchidae
- Genus: Micracanthorhynchina; Strand, 1936

Genus of thorny-headed worms

Micracanthorhynchina is a genus of worms belonging to the family Rhadinorhynchidae.

== Species ==
Species:

- Micracanthorhynchina atherinomori Smales, 2014
- Micracanthorhynchina brevelemniscus Lisitsyna, Barčák, Orosová, Fan & Oros, 2023
- Micracanthorhynchina chandrai Bhattacharya, 2007
- Micracanthorhynchina cynoglossi Wang, 1980
- Micracanthorhynchina dakusuiensis (Harada, 1938)
- Micracanthorhynchina golvani Gupta & Sinha, 1992
- Micracanthorhynchina hemiculturus Demshin, 1965
- Micracanthorhynchina hemirhamphi (Baylis, 1944)
- Micracanthorhynchina indica Farooqi, 1980
- Micracanthorhynchina kuwaitensis Amin & Sey, 1996
- Micracanthorhynchina lateolabracis Wang, 1980
- Micracanthorhynchina motomurai (Harada, 1935)
- Micracanthorhynchina segmentata (Yamaguti, 1959) Araki & Machida, 1987
- Micracanthorhynchina atherinomori Smales, 2014
- Micracanthorhynchina chandrai Bhattacharya, 2007
- Micracanthorhynchina cynoglossi Wang, 1980
- Micracanthorhynchina dakusuiensis (Harada, 1938)
- Micracanthorhynchina golvani Gupta & Sinha, 1992
- Micracanthorhynchina hemiculturus Demshin, 1965
- Micracanthorhynchina hemirhamphi (Baylis, 1944)
- Micracanthorhynchina indica Farooqi, 1980
- Micracanthorhynchina kuwaitensis Amin & Sey, 1996
- Micracanthorhynchina lateolabracis Wang, 1980
- Micracanthorhynchina motomurai (Harada, 1935)
- Micracanthorhynchina sinipercae Wang in Wang, Zhao, Chen & Tao, 1983
