= Megistacantha =

Scientific classification
- Domain: Eukaryota
- Kingdom: Animalia
- Phylum: Rotifera
- Class: Palaeacanthocephala
- Order: Echinorhynchida
- Family: Rhadinorhynchidae
- Genus: Megistacantha; Golvan, 1960

Genus of worms

Megistacantha is a genus of worms belonging to the family Rhadinorhynchidae.

Species:

- Megistacantha horridum (Lühe, 1912)
- Megistacantha sanghaensis Kvach, Jirků & Scholz, 2016
