= Paracanthorhynchus =

Scientific classification
- Domain: Eukaryota
- Kingdom: Animalia
- Phylum: Rotifera
- Class: Palaeacanthocephala
- Order: Echinorhynchida
- Family: Rhadinorhynchidae
- Genus: Paracanthorhynchus; Edmonds, 1967
- Species: P. galaxiasus

Binomial name
- Paracanthorhynchus galaxiasus Edmonds, 1967

Genus of worms

Paracanthorhynchus is a monotypic genus of worms belonging to the family Rhadinorhynchidae. The only species is Paracanthorhynchus galaxiasus.

The species is found in Southern Australia.
