= Pseudauchen =

Scientific classification
- Domain: Eukaryota
- Kingdom: Animalia
- Phylum: Rotifera
- Class: Palaeacanthocephala
- Order: Echinorhynchida
- Family: Rhadinorhynchidae
- Genus: Pseudauchen; Yamaguti, 1963
- Species: P. epinepheli

Binomial name
- Pseudauchen epinepheli (Yamaguti, 1939)

Genus of worms

Pseudauchen is a monotypic genus of worms belonging to the family Rhadinorhynchidae. The only species is Pseudauchen epinepheli. It was originally called Rhadmorhynchus epinepheli by Yamaguti in 1939 then Gorgorhynchus epinepheli by Golvan in 1960. Only ventral spinesn are present on the trunk.
