= Metacanthocephaloides =

Scientific classification
- Domain: Eukaryota
- Kingdom: Animalia
- Phylum: Rotifera
- Class: Palaeacanthocephala
- Order: Echinorhynchida
- Family: Rhadinorhynchidae
- Genus: Metacanthocephaloides; Yamaguti, 1959

Genus of worms

Metacanthocephaloides is a genus of worms belonging to the family Rhadinorhynchidae.

== Species ==
Species:

- Metacanthocephaloides zebrini Yamaguti, 1959
