= Paragorgorhynchus =

Scientific classification
- Domain: Eukaryota
- Kingdom: Animalia
- Phylum: Acanthocephala
- Class: Palaeacanthocephala
- Order: Echinorhynchida
- Family: Rhadinorhynchidae
- Genus: Paragorgorhynchus; Golvan, 1957

Genus of worms

Paragorgorhynchus is a genus of worms belonging to the family Rhadinorhynchidae.

Species:

- Paragorgorhynchus albertianus Golvan, 1957
- Paragorgorhynchus aswanensis Saoud & Wanas, 1990
- Paragorgorhynchus chariensis Troncy, 1970
