= Gorgorhynchus =

Scientific classification
- Domain: Eukaryota
- Kingdom: Animalia
- Phylum: Rotifera
- Class: Palaeacanthocephala
- Order: Echinorhynchida
- Family: Rhadinorhynchidae
- Genus: Gorgorhynchus; Chandler, 1934

Genus of thorny-headed worms

Gorgorhynchus is a genus of worms belonging to the family Rhadinorhynchidae.

The species of this genus are found in Central America, Australia.

Species:

- Gorgorhynchoides valiyathurae (Nadakal, John & Jacob, 1990)
- Gorgorhynchus celebensis (Yamaguti, 1954)
- Gorgorhynchus celebesensis (Yamaguti, 1954) Golvan, 1969
- Gorgorhynchus clavatus Van Cleave, 1940
- Gorgorhynchus lateolabri Yin & Wu, 1984
- Gorgorhynchus lepidus Van Cleave, 1940
- Gorgorhynchus medius (Linton, 1908)
- Gorgorhynchus nemipteri Parukhin, 1973
- Gorgorhynchus occultus Smales, Barton & Chisholm, 2019
- Gorgorhynchus ophiocephali Furtado & Lau, 1971
- Gorgorhynchus polymixiae Kovalenko, 1981
- Gorgorhynchus robertdollfusi Golvan, 1956
- Gorgorhynchus satoi (Morisita, 1937)
- Gorgorhynchus tonkinensis H.a.Amin, 2011
- Gorgorhynchus trachinotus Noronha, Vicente, Pinto & Fábio, 1986
