= Leptorhynchoides =

Scientific classification
- Domain: Eukaryota
- Kingdom: Animalia
- Phylum: Rotifera
- Class: Palaeacanthocephala
- Order: Echinorhynchida
- Family: Rhadinorhynchidae
- Genus: Leptorhynchoides; Kostylew, 1924

Genus of worms

Leptorhynchoides is a genus of parasitic worms belonging to the family Rhadinorhynchidae.

The species of this genus are found in Europe and Northern America.

Species:

- Leptorhynchoides acanthidion Steinauer & Nickol, 2015
- Leptorhynchoides aphredoderi Buckner & Buckner, 1976
- Leptorhynchoides apoglyphicus Steinauer & Nickol, 2015
- Leptorhynchoides atlanteus Steinauer & Nickol, 2015
- Leptorhynchoides macrorchis Steinauer & Nickol, 2015
- Leptorhynchoides nebularosis Steinauer & Nickol, 2015
- Leptorhynchoides plagicephalus (Westrumb, 1821)
- Leptorhynchoides polycristatus Amin, Heckmann, Halajian, El-Naggar & Tavakol, 2013
- Leptorhynchoides seminolus Steinauer & Nickol, 2015
- Leptorhynchoides thecatus (Linton, 1891)
