= Pseudoleptorhynchoides =

Scientific classification
- Domain: Eukaryota
- Kingdom: Animalia
- Phylum: Acanthocephala
- Class: Palaeacanthocephala
- Order: Echinorhynchida
- Family: Rhadinorhynchidae
- Genus: Pseudoleptorhynchoides; Salgado-Maldonado, 1976
- Species: P. lamothei

Binomial name
- Pseudoleptorhynchoides lamothei Salgado-Maldonado, 1976

Genus of worms

Pseudoleptorhynchoides is a monotypic genus of worms belonging to the family Rhadinorhynchidae. The only species is Pseudoleptorhynchoides lamothei.

It parasitizes blue sea catfish (Ariopsis guatemalensis) in a eutrophic coastal lagoon from Pacific off the coast of Mexico. Phylogenetic tests were done.
