= Metacanthocephalus =

Scientific classification
- Domain: Eukaryota
- Kingdom: Animalia
- Phylum: Rotifera
- Class: Palaeacanthocephala
- Order: Echinorhynchida
- Family: Rhadinorhynchidae
- Genus: Metacanthocephalus; Yamaguti, 1959

Genus of worms

Metacanthocephalus is a genus of worms belonging to the family Rhadinorhynchidae.

The species of this genus are found in Antarctica.

Species:

- Metacanthocephalus campbelli (Leiper & Atkinson, 1914)
- Metacanthocephalus dalmori Zdzitowiecki, 1983
- Metacanthocephalus johnstoni Zdzitowiecki, 1983
- Metacanthocephalus ovicephalus (Zhukov, 1963)
- Metacanthocephalus pleuronichthydis Yamaguti, 1959
- Metacanthocephalus rennicki (Leiper & Atkinson, 1914)
