= Cleaveius =

Scientific classification
- Domain: Eukaryota
- Kingdom: Animalia
- Phylum: Acanthocephala
- Class: Palaeacanthocephala
- Order: Echinorhynchida
- Family: Rhadinorhynchidae
- Genus: Cleaveius; Subrahmanian, 1927

Synonyms
- Mehrarhynchus Datta, 1940

Genus of worms

Cleaveius is a genus of worms belonging to the family Rhadinorhynchidae.

The species of this genus are found in Indian Ocean.

Species:

- Cleaveius circumspinifer Subrahmanian, 1927
- Cleaveius clupei (Gupta & Sinha, 1992)
- Cleaveius durdanae Kumar, 1992
- Cleaveius fotedari (Gupta & Naqvi, 1980)
- Cleaveius inglisi (Gupta & Fatma, 1987)
- Cleaveius leiognathi Jain & Gupta, 1979
- Cleaveius longirostris Moravec & Sey, 1989
- Cleaveius mysti (Sahay & Sinha, 1971)
- Cleaveius portblairensis Jain & Gupta, 1979
- Cleaveius prashadi (Datta, 1940)
- Cleaveius puriensis (Gupta & Sinha, 1992)
- Cleaveius secundus (Tripathi, 1956)
- Cleaveius singhai (Gupta & Fatma, 1987)
- Cleaveius thapari (Gupta & Naqvi, 1980)
