= Rhadinorhynchus =

Scientific classification
- Kingdom: Animalia
- Phylum: Acanthocephala
- Class: Palaeacanthocephala
- Order: Echinorhynchida
- Family: Rhadinorhynchidae
- Genus: Rhadinorhynchus; Lühe, 1911

Genus of thorny-headed worms

Rhadinorhynchus is a genus of worms belonging to the family Rhadinorhynchidae.

The genus has cosmopolitan distribution.

Species:

- Rhadinorhynchus africanus (Golvan, Houin & Deltour, 1963)
- Rhadinorhynchus atheri (Farooqi, 1981)
- Rhadinorhynchus bicircumspinus Hooper, 1983
- Rhadinorhynchus biformis Smales, 2014
- Rhadinorhynchus cadenati (Golvan & Houin, 1964)
- Rhadinorhynchus camerounensis Golvan, 1969
- Rhadinorhynchus capensis Bray, 1974
- Rhadinorhynchus carangis Yamaguti, 1939
- Rhadinorhynchus chongmingensis Huang, Zheng, Deng, Fan & Ni, 1988
- Rhadinorhynchus chongmingnensis Huang, Zheng, Deng, Fan & Ni, 1988
- Rhadinorhynchus circumspinus Amin, Rubtsova & Nguyen, 2019
- Rhadinorhynchus cololabis Laurs & McCauley, 1964
- Rhadinorhynchus decapteri (Braicovich, Lanfranchi, Farber, Marvaldi, Luque & Timi, 2014) Huston, Cribb & Smales, 2020
- Rhadinorhynchus decapteri Parukhin & Kovalenko, 1976
- Rhadinorhynchus ditrematis Yamaguti, 1939
- Rhadinorhynchus dollfusi Gupta & Fatma, 1987
- Rhadinorhynchus dorsoventrospinosus Amin, Heckmann & Ha, 2011
- Rhadinorhynchus dujardini Golvan, 1969
- Rhadinorhynchus echeneisi Gupta & Gupta, 1980
- Rhadinorhynchus erumeii (Gupta & Fatma, 1981)
- Rhadinorhynchus ganapatii Chandra, Hanumantha-Rao & Shyamasundari, 1985
- Rhadinorhynchus gerberi Lisitsyna, Kudlai, Cribb & Smit, 2019
- Rhadinorhynchus hiansi Soota & Bhattacharya, 1981
- Rhadinorhynchus japonicus Fujita, 1920
- Rhadinorhynchus johnstoni Golvan, 1969
- Rhadinorhynchus keralensis Gupta & Fatma, 1987
- Rhadinorhynchus laterospinosus Amin, Heckmann & Ha, 2011
- Rhadinorhynchus lintoni Cable & Linderoth, 1963
- Rhadinorhynchus mariserpentis (Steinauer, Garcia-Vedrenne, Weinstein & Kuris, 2019) Huston, Cribb & Smales, 2020
- Rhadinorhynchus multispinosus Amin, Rubtsova & Nguyen, 2019
- Rhadinorhynchus oligospinosus Amin & Heckmann, 2017
- Rhadinorhynchus ornatus Van Cleave, 1918
- Rhadinorhynchus pacificus Amin, Rubtsova & Nguyen, 2019
- Rhadinorhynchus pelamysi Gupta & Gupta, 1980
- Rhadinorhynchus pichelinae Smales, 2014
- Rhadinorhynchus plagioscionis Thatcher, 1980
- Rhadinorhynchus plotosi Parukhin, 1985
- Rhadinorhynchus polydactyli Smales, 2014
- Rhadinorhynchus polynemi Gupta & Lata, 1967
- Rhadinorhynchus pomatomi Smales, 2014
- Rhadinorhynchus pristis (Rudolphi, 1802)
- Rhadinorhynchus saltatrix Troncy & Vassiliades, 1973
- Rhadinorhynchus selkirki Van Cleave, 1921
- Rhadinorhynchus seriolae (Yamaguti, 1963)
- Rhadinorhynchus stunkardi Gupta & Fatma, 1987
- Rhadinorhynchus trachinoti
- Rhadinorhynchus trachuri Harada, 1935
- Rhadinorhynchus trivandricus George & Nadakal, 1978
- Rhadinorhynchus vancleavei Golvan, 1969
- Rhadinorhynchus yangtzenensis Yu & Wu, 1984
- Rhadinorhynchus zhukovi Golvan, 1969
