= Heteracanthocephalidae =

Scientific classification
- Domain: Eukaryota
- Kingdom: Animalia
- Phylum: Rotifera
- Class: Palaeacanthocephala
- Order: Echinorhynchida
- Family: Heteracanthocephalidae; Petrochenko, 1956

Family of thorny-headed worms

Heteracanthocephalidae is a family of parasitic worms from the order Echinorhynchida.

== Species ==
Heteracanthocephalidae contains two subfamilies (Aspersentinae and Heteracanthocephalinae) and the following species: (Note: A binomial authority in parentheses indicates that the species was originally described in a genus other than the present genus.)

=== Aspersentinae Golvan, 1960 ===
Aspersentis Van Cleave, 1929

- Aspersentis austrinus Van Cleave, 1929
- Aspersentis dissosthychi (Parukhin, 1989)
- Aspersentis johni (Bayliss, 1929)

A. johni was found parasitizing Patagonotothen longipes and Champsocephalus esox in the eastern mouth of the Beagle Channel.

- Aspersentis megarhynchus (von Linstow, 1892)
- Aspersentis minor Edmonds and Smales, 1992
- Aspersentis peltorhamphi (Baylis, 1944)
- Aspersentis zanclorhynchi (Johnston and Best, 1937)

=== Heteracanthocephalinae Petrochenko, 1956 ===
Bullockrhynchus Chandra, Hanumantha-Rao & Shyamasundari, 1985

- Bullockrhynchus indicus Chandra, Hanumantha-Rao & Shyamasundari, 1985

Sachalinorhynchus Krotov and Petrochenko, 1956

- Sachalinorhynchus skrjabini Krotov and Petrochenko, 1956

== Molecular characterization ==
In 2024, the complete mitochondrial genome of Aspersentis megarhynchus was sequenced and annotated for the first time. This was the first mitogenomic data for the genus Aspersentis and also for the family Heteracanthocephalidae. The mitogenome of A. megarhynchus has 14,661 bp and includes 36 genes, containing 12 protein-coding genes (missing atp8), 22 tRNA genes, and 2 ribosomal RNAs (rrnS and rrnL), plus two non-coding regions.

A phylogenetic analysis suggested close affinity between the Heteracanthocephalidae and the Echinorhynchidae within the order Echinorhynchida.
