= Isthmosacanthus =

Scientific classification
- Kingdom: Animalia
- Phylum: Acanthocephala
- Class: Palaeacanthocephala
- Order: Echinorhynchida
- Family: Isthmosacanthidae; Smales, 2012
- Genus: Isthmosacanthus; Smales, 2012
- Species: I. fitzroyensis

Binomial name
- Isthmosacanthus fitzroyensis Smales, 2012

Genus of thorny-headed worms

Isthmosacanthus is a genus of thorny-headed worms. It is the only genus in the family Isthmosacanthidae in the order Echinorhynchida. Isthmosacanthus has only one species, Isthmosacanthus fitzroyensis. It is found in threadfin fish of Northern Australia.
