= Sauracanthorhynchus =

Scientific classification
- Kingdom: Animalia
- Phylum: Acanthocephala
- Class: Palaeacanthocephala
- Order: Echinorhynchida
- Family: Sauracanthorhynchidae; Bursey, Goldberg and Kraus, 2007
- Genus: Sauracanthorhynchus; Bursey, Goldberg and Kraus, 2007
- Species: S. sphenomorphicola

Binomial name
- Sauracanthorhynchus sphenomorphicola Bursey, Goldberg and Kraus, 2007

Genus of thorny-headed worms

Sauracanthorhynchus is a genus of thorny-headed worms. It is the only genus in the family Sauracanthorhynchidae in the order Echinorhynchida. It contains a single species Sauracanthorhynchus sphenomorphicola. It was found the intestines of the skink Sphenomorphus granulatus. The host is found from the Huon Peninsula to Milne Bay Province, and the adjacent D'Entrecasteaux Islands of Fergusson, and Normamby. The reported range of the parasite is restricted to Milne Bay Province, Papua New Guinea. The genus is named after the order of its host, and the species is named after the genus of its host.
