= List of Archiacanthocephala species =

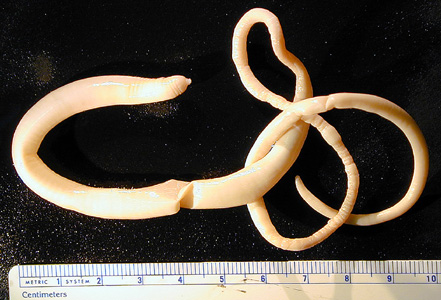
Adult Macracanthorhynchus hirudinaceus

Archiacanthocephala is a class within the phylum of Acanthocephala. They are parasitic worms that attach themselves to the intestinal wall of terrestrial vertebrates, including humans. They are characterised by the body wall and the lemnisci (which are a bundle of sensory nerve fibers), which have nuclei that divide without spindle formation, or the appearance of chromosomes, or it has a few amoebae-like giant nuclei. Typically, there are eight separate cement glands in the male, which is one of the few ways to distinguish the dorsal and ventral sides of these organisms.

== Classification ==
Archiacanthocephala is a class consisting of four orders.

- Apororhynchida
- Gigantorhynchida
- Moniliformida
- Oligacanthorhynchida
