= Fessisentis =

Scientific classification
- Kingdom: Animalia
- Phylum: Acanthocephala
- Class: Palaeacanthocephala
- Order: Echinorhynchida
- Family: Fessisentidae; Van Cleve, 1931
- Genus: Fessisentis; Van Cleve, 1931

Genus of thorny-headed worms

Fessisentis is a genus of parasitic spiny-headed (or thorny-headed) worms. It is the only genus in the family Fessisentidae. This genus contains six species that are distributed across the Eastern continental United States as far west as Oklahoma and Wisconsin. These worms parasitize salamanders and fish.

== Taxonomy and description ==
Species of Fessisentis are highly variable and there are few recognized diagnostic characteristics. Classification depends upon comparison of many characters, the ranges of which frequently overlap at the extremes however lemniscal length is a relatively consistent difference among species.

== Species ==
There are six species in the genus Fessisentis. (Note: A binomial authority in parentheses indicates that the species was originally described in a genus other than the present genus.)

- Fessisentis acutulus (Van Cleave, 1931)

F. acutulus has been found parasitizing the Eastern newt, (Notophthalmus viridescens). F. acutulus has been rarely collected since its original description. It has been found in North Carolina salamanders Ambystoma opacum, Desmognathus fuscus, Plethodon glutinosus, and Notophthalmus viridescens by Rankin in 1938, from the Northern slimy salamander (Plethodon glutinosus) in Louisiana by Nickol in 1969 and from the Hellbender (Cryptobranchus alleganiensis) in Missouri by Dyer and Brandon in 1973.

- Fessisentis fessus Van Cleve, 1931

F. fessus has been found infecting the Lesser siren (Siren intermedia) from Union County, Illinois and the Freshwater drum (Aplodinotus grunniens) in Money, Mississippi and Manchac, Tangipahoa Parish, Louisiana. It is the type species. Intermediate hosts infected with cystacanths (a larval or resting stage for acanthocephalans) include the aquatic isopods Asellus forbesi and Licreus lineatus in Jackson County, Illinois. Females are between 20 and 52 mm long and with a subterminal genital pore and males usually have two testes, which is unique in the Fessisentis genus.

- Fessisentis friedi Nickol, 1972

F. friedi has been found infecting the grass pickerel (Esox americanus) and the White sucker (Catostomus commersoni). It has a limited distribution, being found only in southeastern New Hampshire, southeastern Massachusetts (by Haley and Bullock in 1953), and from Northampton County, Pennsylvania (by Fried, Kitchen, and Koplin in 1964). F. friedi possesses lemnisci shorter than those of F. fessus and F. vancleavei, but longer than those of F. necturorum. It is the only species of Fessisentis in which branched lemnisci have not been observed. Although proboscis shape is variable, F. friedi differs from other species of the genus by possession, in general, of a long, cylindrical proboscis armed, especially in females, with more hooks per longitudinal row. The intermediate host is the isopod Caecidotea communis where F. friedi is free and unencysted in the hemocoel as cystacanths.

The transfer of Acanthocephalus vancleavei to F. vancleavei required renaming the original F. vancleavei to be renamed F. friedi by Nickol in 1972 to avoid duplication. The species name friedi was chosen to honour Dr. Bernard Fried who contributed to research on this species.

- Fessisentis necturorum Nickol, 1967

F. necturorum was found parasitizing the Marbled salamander (Ambystoma opacum) larvae near Athens, Georgia and the Gulf Coast waterdog (Necturus beyeri) from southern Louisiana. The intermediate host is an isopod Asellus scrupulosus.

- Fessisentis tichiganensis Amin, 1980

F. tichiganensis has been found parasitizing 11 species of fish. The species name was given after the location where it first discovered: Tichigan Lake in Racine County, Wisconsin. The proboscis is 448-616 um long in males and 616-826 um in females. The proboscis hook rows with 11-13 hooks in males and 12-15 in females.

- Fessisentis vancleavei (Hughes and Moore, 1943)

F. vancleavei has been found infecting the Oklahoma salamander (Eurycea tynerensis) in Oklahoma. It has also been found infecting the Many-ribbed salamander (Eurycea multiplicata) in Arkansas. The largest proboscis hooks are 35 to 49 um long and the smallest are 18 to 30 um long. Cement glands varied from 2 to 7 with 4 or 5 being the usual number. Proboscis receptacle wall musculature has 2 layers of tubular bundles with peripheral contractile fibers and a central noncontractile cytoplasm characteristic to other species in the genus.

== Distribution ==
The distribution of Fessisentis species are determined by that of its hosts. They are found across the United States.

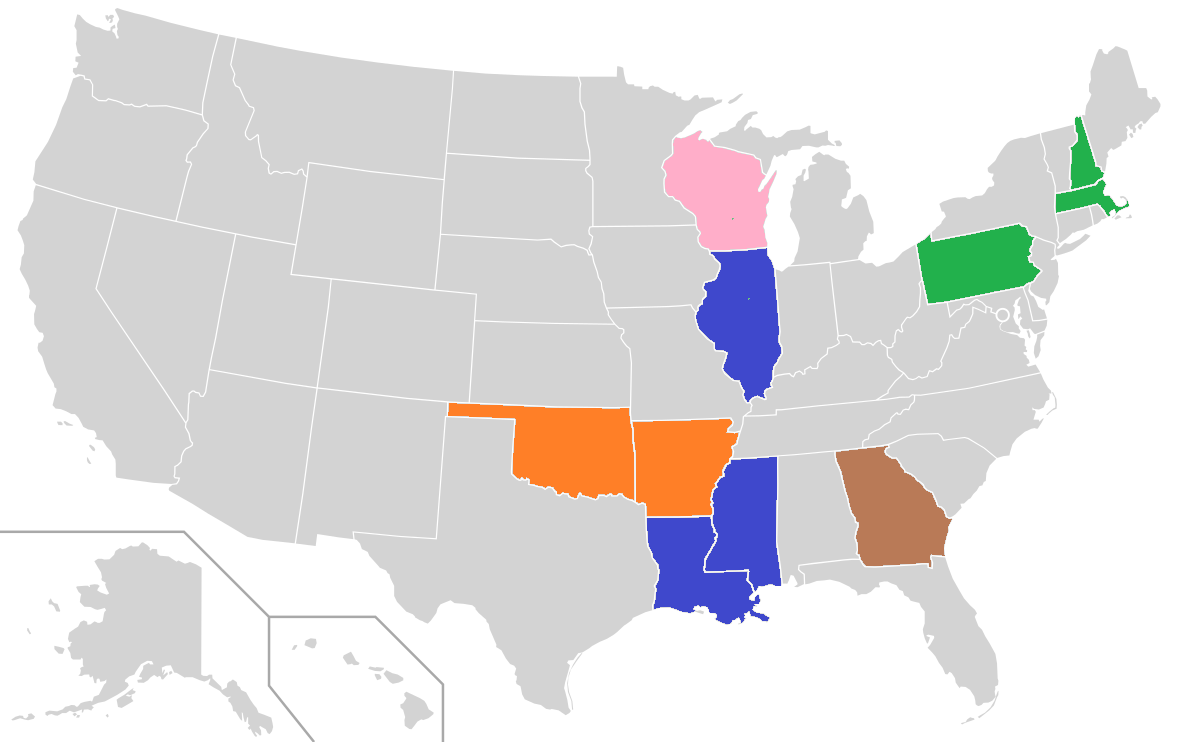
Location of Fessisentis species in the United States F. acutulus F. fessus F. friedi F. necturorum F. tichiganensis F. vancleavei

== Hosts ==
Fessisentis species exclusively parasitize, as adults, North American gilled salamanders and freshwater fishes.

Hosts for Fessisentis species

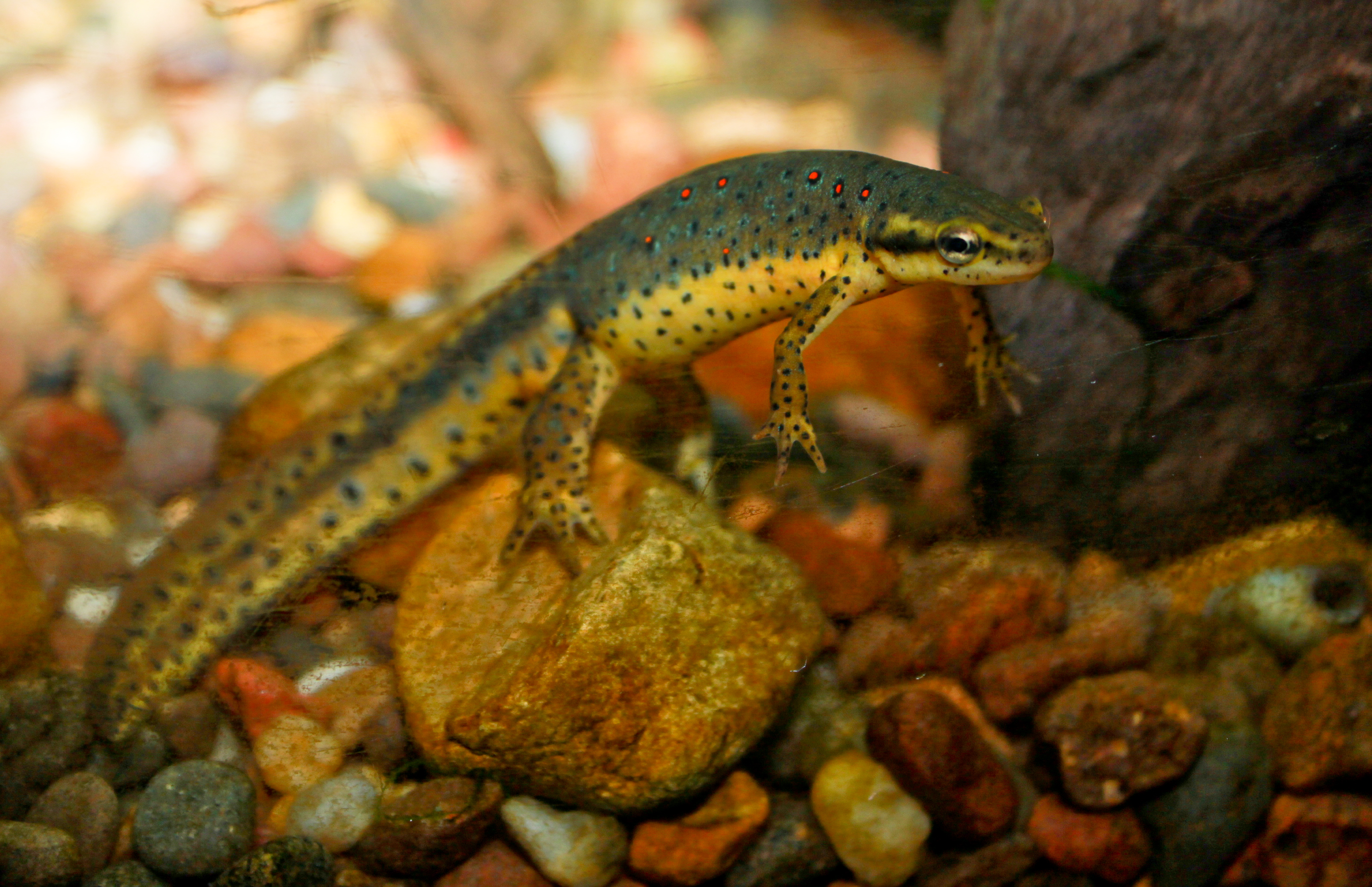
The Eastern newt is one of the hosts of F. acutulus

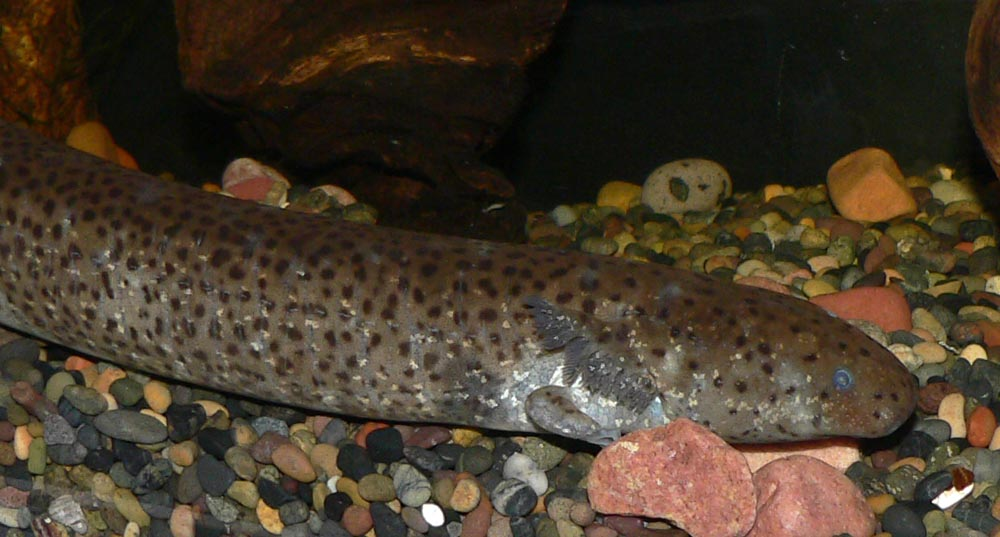
The Lesser siren is one of the hosts of F. fessus

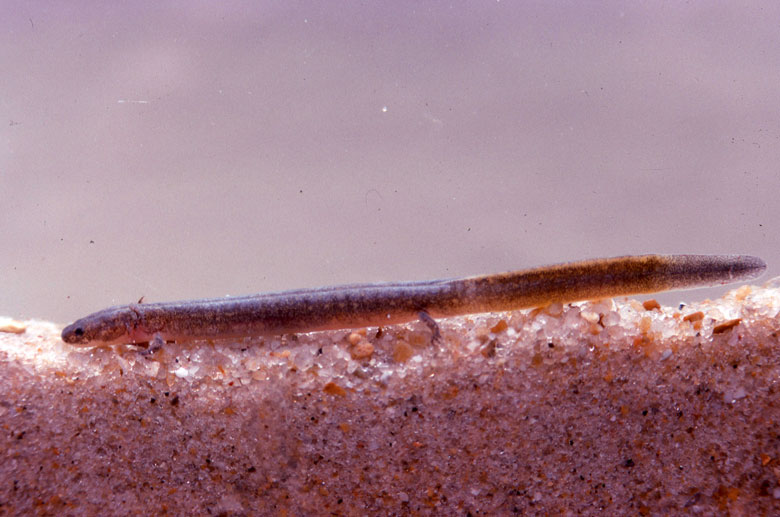
The Oklahoma salamander is one of the hosts of F. vancleavei
