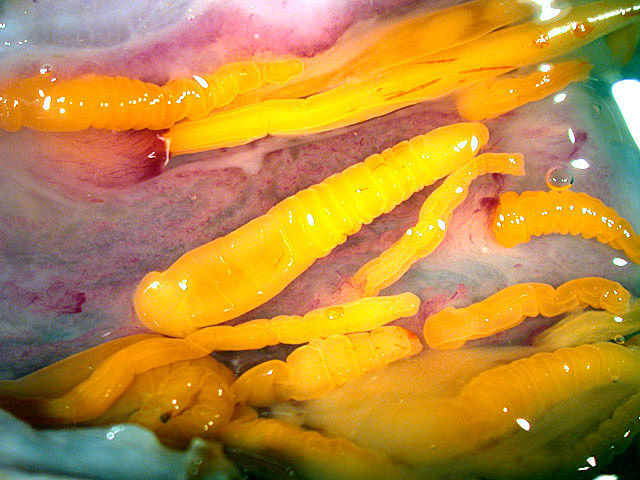
- Pomphorhynchus sp. in a bluefish

Scientific classification
- Kingdom: Animalia
- Phylum: Acanthocephala
- Class: Palaeacanthocephala
- Order: Echinorhynchida
- Family: Pomphorhynchidae; Yamaguti, 1939

= Pomphorhynchidae =

Family of thorny-headed worms

Pomphorhynchidae is a family of parasitic worms from the order Echinorhynchida.

== Species ==
Pomphorhynchidae has five genera which contain the following species: (Note: A binomial authority in parentheses indicates that the species was originally described in a genus other than the present genus.)

=== Longicollum ===
Longicollum Yamaguti, 1935 contains many species:

- Longicollum alemniscus (Harada, 1935)
- Longicollum cadenati Gupta & Naqvi, 1984
- Longicollum chabanaudi Dollfus & Golvan, 1963
- Longicollum dattai Saxena, Johri & Gupta, 2008
- Longicollum edmondsi Golvan, 1969
- Longicollum engraulisi Gupta & Fatma, 1985
- Longicollum indicum Gupta & Gupta, 1970
- Longicollum lutjani Jain & Gupta, 1980
- Longicollum noellae Golvan, 1969
- Longicollum pagrosomi Yamaguti, 1935

L. pagrosomi was found parasitizing the Atlantic horse mackerel (Trachurus trachurus) in the bay of Gemlik, Turkey. The body was between 5036 and 10164 μm long and 478 and 878) μm wide. The proboscis was cylindrical, wider anteriorly, between 2310 and 5313 μm long, and armed with 11 or 12 rows of hooks comprising 11 to 13 hooks in each. The anterior hooks were smaller than the posterior, measuring 34 (24 – 42) μm, 42 (40 – 44) μm, to 61 (54 – 70) μm long. The short proboscis sac consisted of two membranes. The lemnisci were level with the proboscis. One immature male sample had two spherical testes, 216 × 272 μm in diameter. The copulatory bursa was 80 by 140 μm. The cement glands were indistinct. The eggs measured between 70 and 210 μm long and 17 and 52 μm wide.

- Longicollum psettodesai Gupta & Gupta, 1980
- Longicollum quiloni Gupta & Naqvi, 1984
- Longicollum riouxi Golvan, 1969

=== Paralongicollum ===
Paralongicollum Amin, Bauer & Sidorov, 1991 contains two species:

- Paralongicollum nemacheili Amin, Bauer & Sidorov, 1991
- Paralongicollum sergenti (Choquette & Gayot, 1952)

=== Pomphorhynchus ===
Pomphorhynchus Monticelli, 1905 contains many species:

  - Pomphorhynchus bosniacus Kistaroly and Cankovic, 1969
  - Pomphorhynchus bufonis Fotedar, Duda and Raina, 1970
  - Pomphorhynchus bulbocolli Linkins in Van Cleave, 1919
  - Pomphorhynchus bullocki Gupta and Lata, 1968
  - Pomphorhynchus cylindrica Wang and Gu, 1983
  - Pomphorhynchus dubious Kaw, 1941
  - Pomphorhynchus francoisae Golvan, 1969
  - Pomphorhynchus jammuensis Fotedar and Dhar, 1977
  - Pomphorhynchus kashmirensis Kaw, 1941
  - Pomphorhynchus kawi Fotedar, Duda and Raina, 1970
  - Pomphorhynchus kostylewi Petrochenko, 1956
  - Pomphorhynchus laevis (Zoega in Müller, 1776)

P. laevis is a parasitic acanthocephalan worm that can influence the reaction of its intermediate host, the freshwater amphipod Gammarus pulex, to the smell of potential predators like perch, Perca fluviatilis.

P. laevis facilitates its movement from its initial host. Research has demonstrated that organisms affected by the parasite exhibit a diminished or inverted avoidance response to the scent of predators when compared to uninfested specimens, supporting the notion that the parasite manipulates its host, with the goal of passing itself on to its definitive host, a freshwater fish. Affected specimens also demonstrate vibrant changes in color, making them more visible to predators.

This worm swells its proboscis to press microneedles into the intestinal wall, with a very strong adhesive force. This has inspired a structural skin graft adhesive that sticks strongly but has minimal tissue damage while in place and upon removal.

  - Pomphorhynchus lucyi Williams & Rogers, 1984
  - Pomphorhynchus megacanthus Fotedar and Dhar, 1977
  - Pomphorhynchus moyanoi Olmes and Habit, 2007
  - Pomphorhynchus omarsegundoi Arredondo and Gil de Pertierra, 2010
  - Pomphorhynchus oreini Fotedar and Dhar, 1977
  - Pomphorhynchus orientalis Fotedar and Dhar, 1977
  - Pomphorhynchus patagonicus Ortubay, Ubeda, Semenas and Kennedy, 1991
  - Pomphorhynchus perforator (von Linstow, 1908)
  - Pomphorhynchus purhepechus García-Varela, Mendoza-Garfias, Choudhury & Pérez-Ponce de León, 2017
  - Pomphorhynchus rocci Cordonnier & Ward, 1967
  - Pomphorhynchus sebastichthydis Yamaguti, 1939
  - Pomphorhynchus sphaericus Pertierra, Spatz and Doma, 1996
  - Pomphorhynchus spindletruncatus Amin, Abdullah and Mhaisen, 2003
  - Pomphorhynchus tereticollis (Rudolphi, 1809)
  - Pomphorhynchus tori Fotedar and Dhar, 1977
  - Pomphorhynchus yamagutii Schmidt and Higgins, 1973
  - Pomphorhynchus yunnanensis Wang, 1981
  - Pomphorhynchus zhoushanensis Li, Chen, Amin & Yang, 2017

=== Tenuiproboscis ===
Tenuiproboscis Yamaguti, 1935 contains many species:

- Tenuiproboscis bilqeesae Gupta & Naqvi, 1992
- Tenuiproboscis clupei Gupta & Sinha, 1992
- Tenuiproboscis edmondi Gupta & Naqvi, 1992
- Tenuiproboscis ernakulensis Gupta & Naqvi, 1992
- Tenuiproboscis guptai Gupta & Sinha, 1989
- Tenuiproboscis keralensis Kaur, Shamal, Chandran, Binesh, Gishnu, Asokan & Sanil, 2017
- Tenuiproboscis meyeri Saxena & Gupta, 2007
- Tenuiproboscis misgurni Yamaguti, 1935
