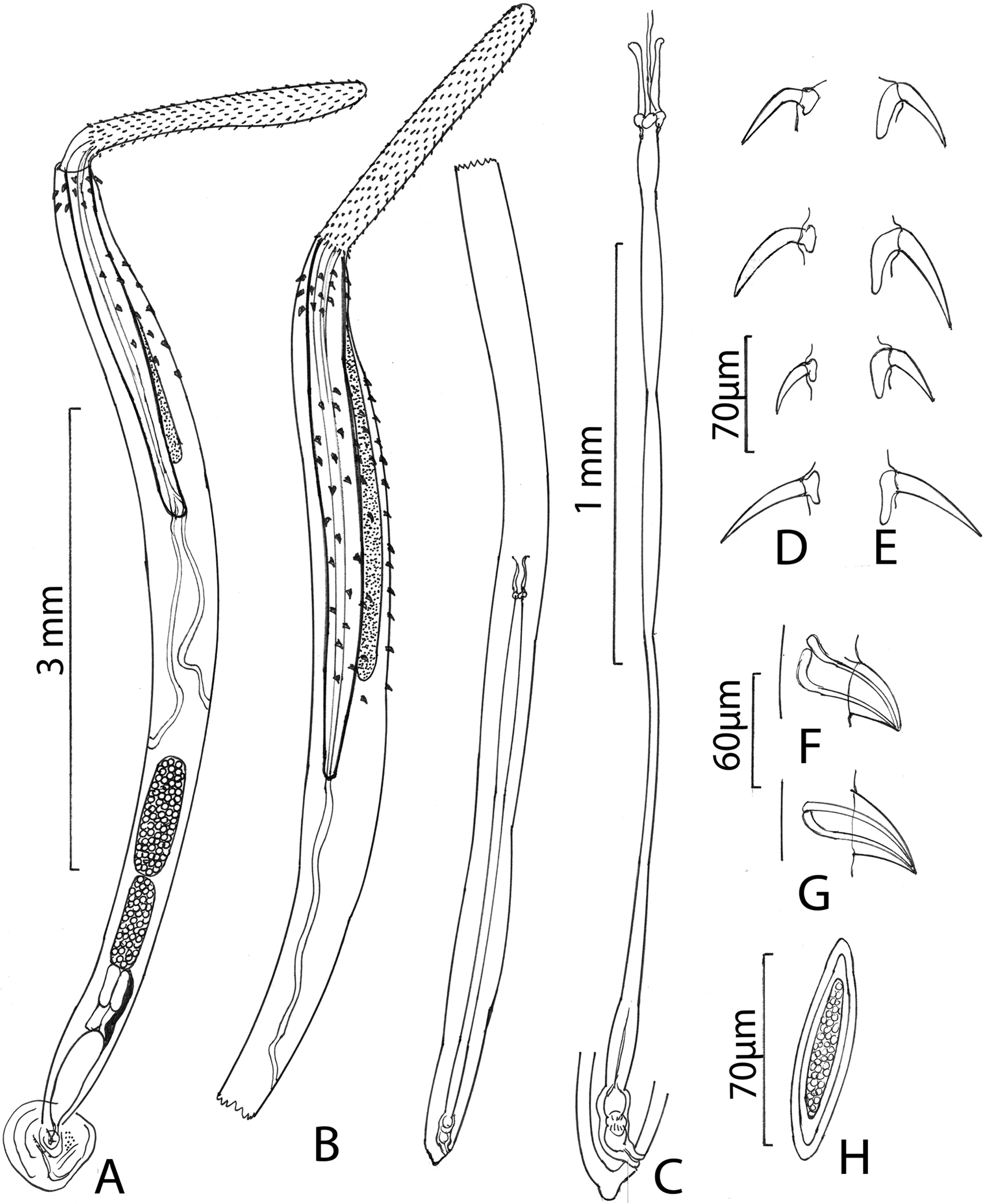
- Rhadinorhynchus oligospinosus

Scientific classification
- Kingdom: Animalia
- Phylum: Acanthocephala
- Class: Palaeacanthocephala
- Order: Echinorhynchida
- Family: Rhadinorhynchidae; Travassos, 1923

= Rhadinorhynchidae =

Family of worms

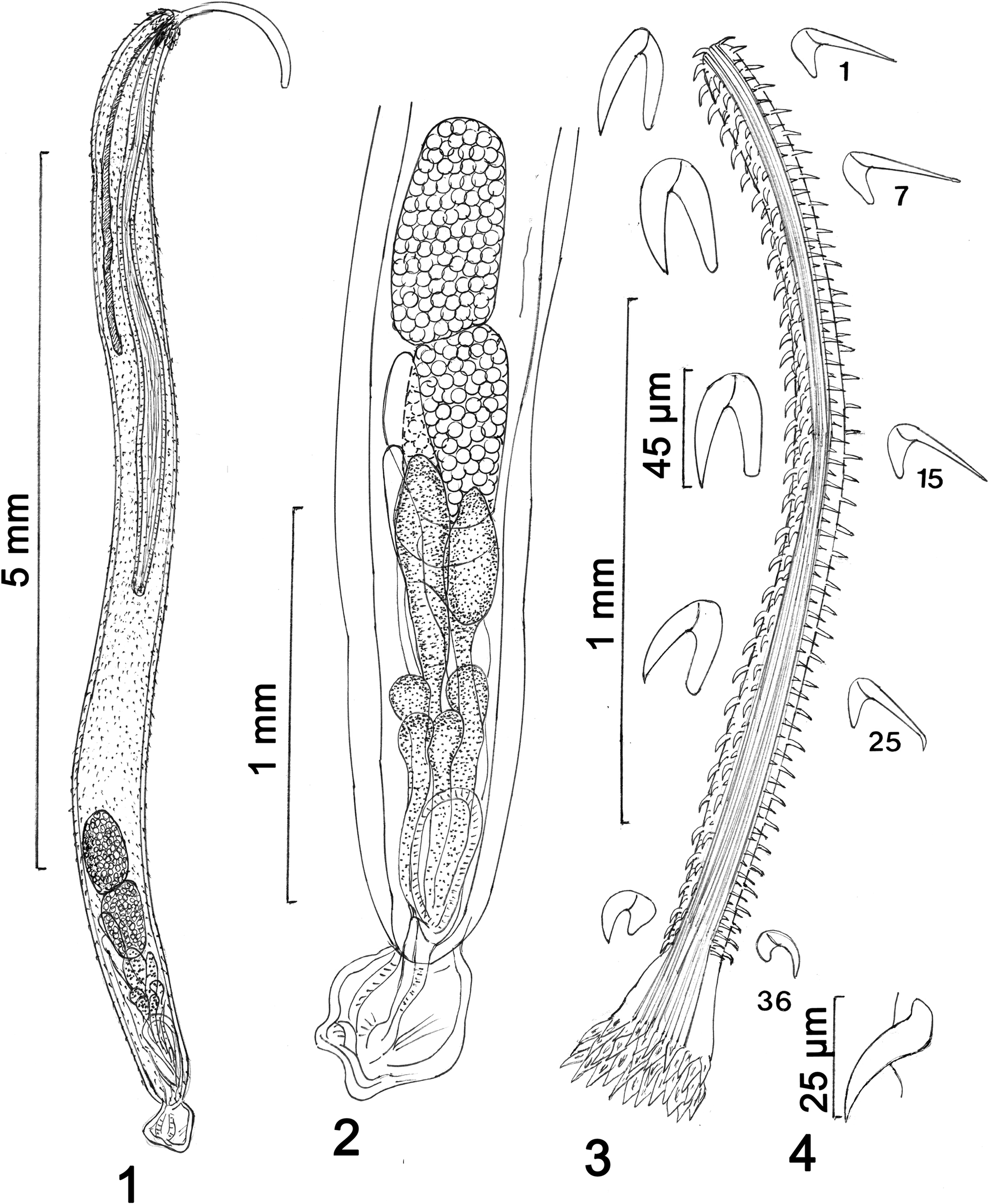
Cathayacanthus spinitruncatus

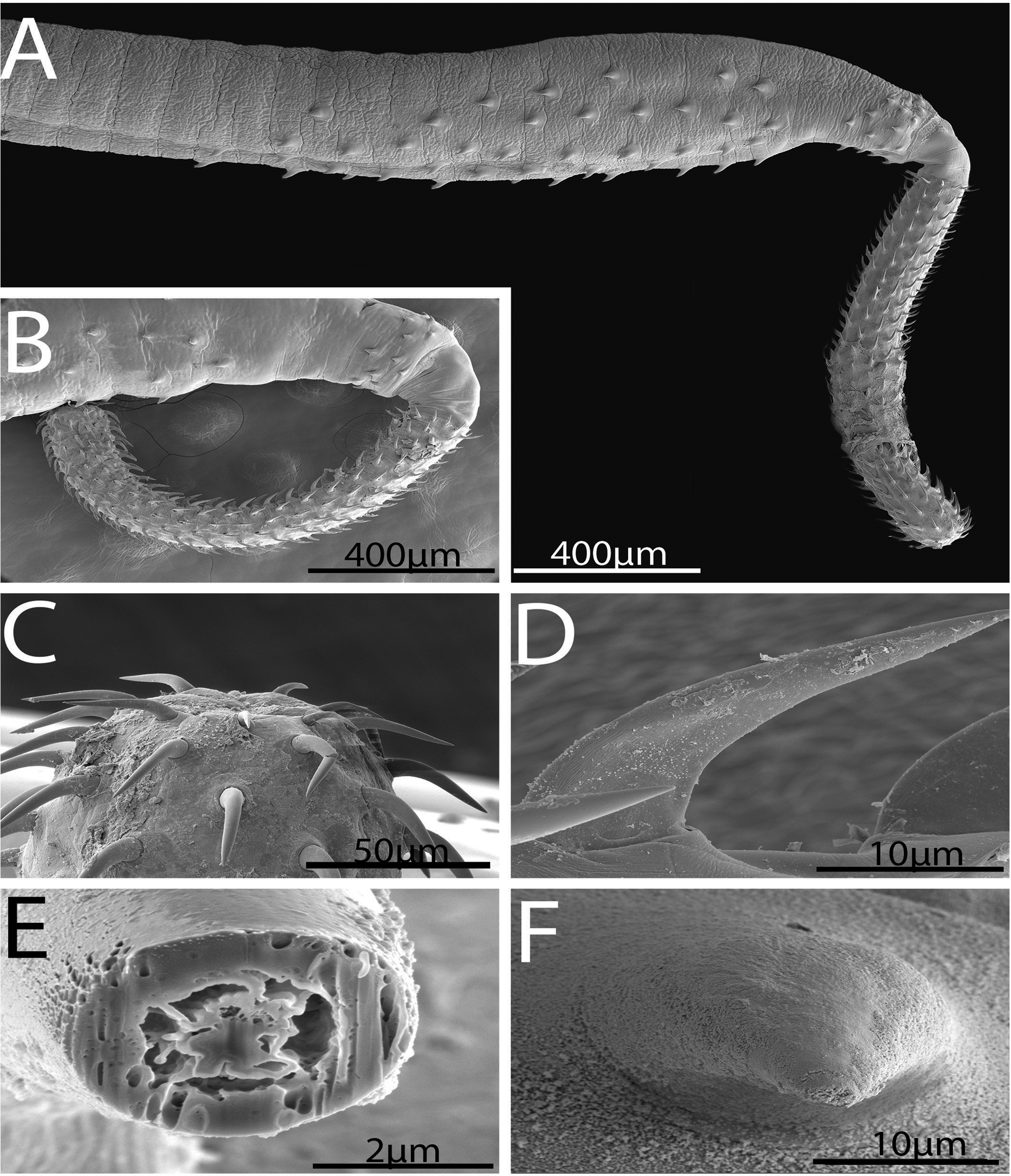
SEM of Rhadinorhynchus oligospinosus

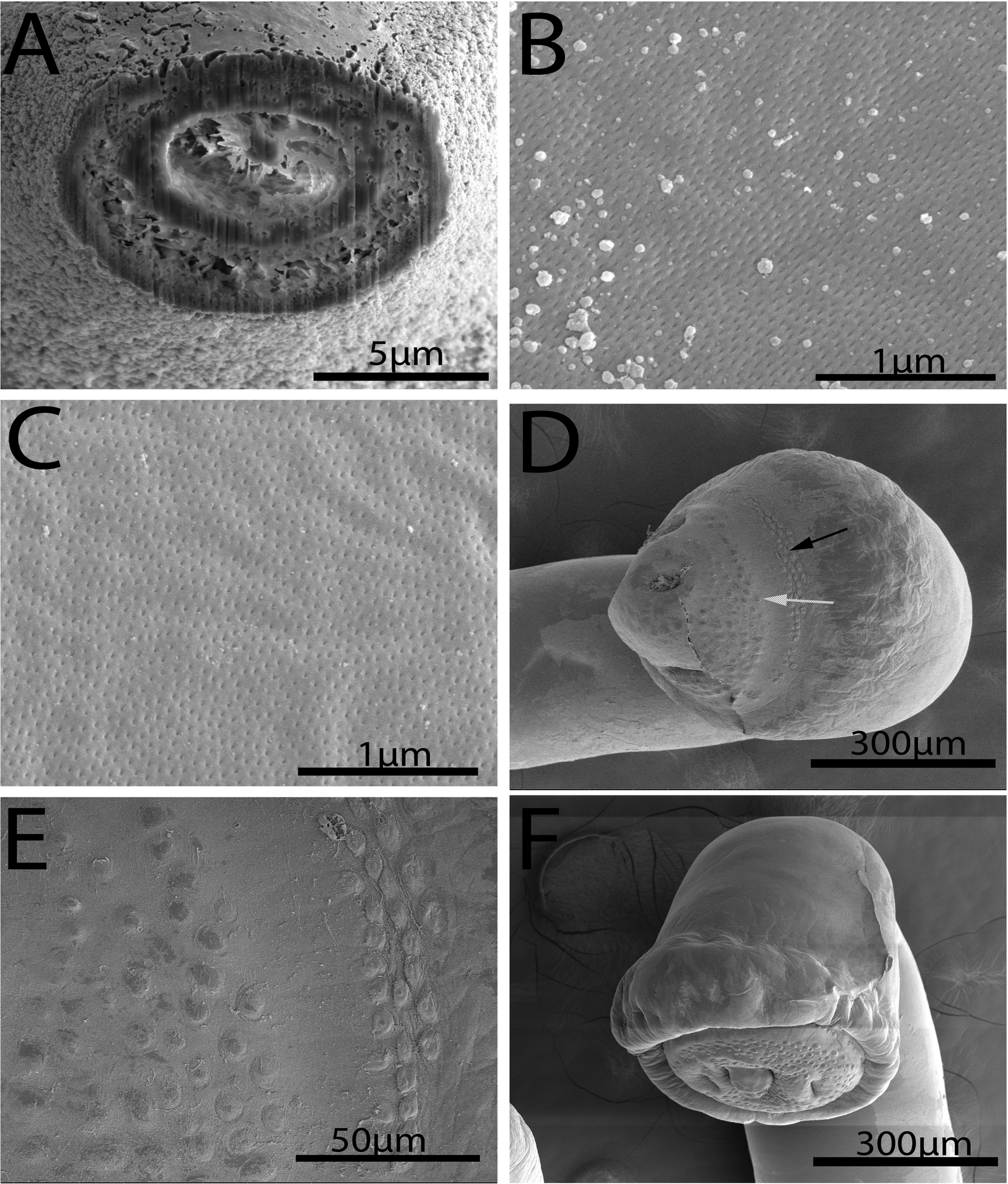
SEM of Rhadinorhynchus oligospinosus

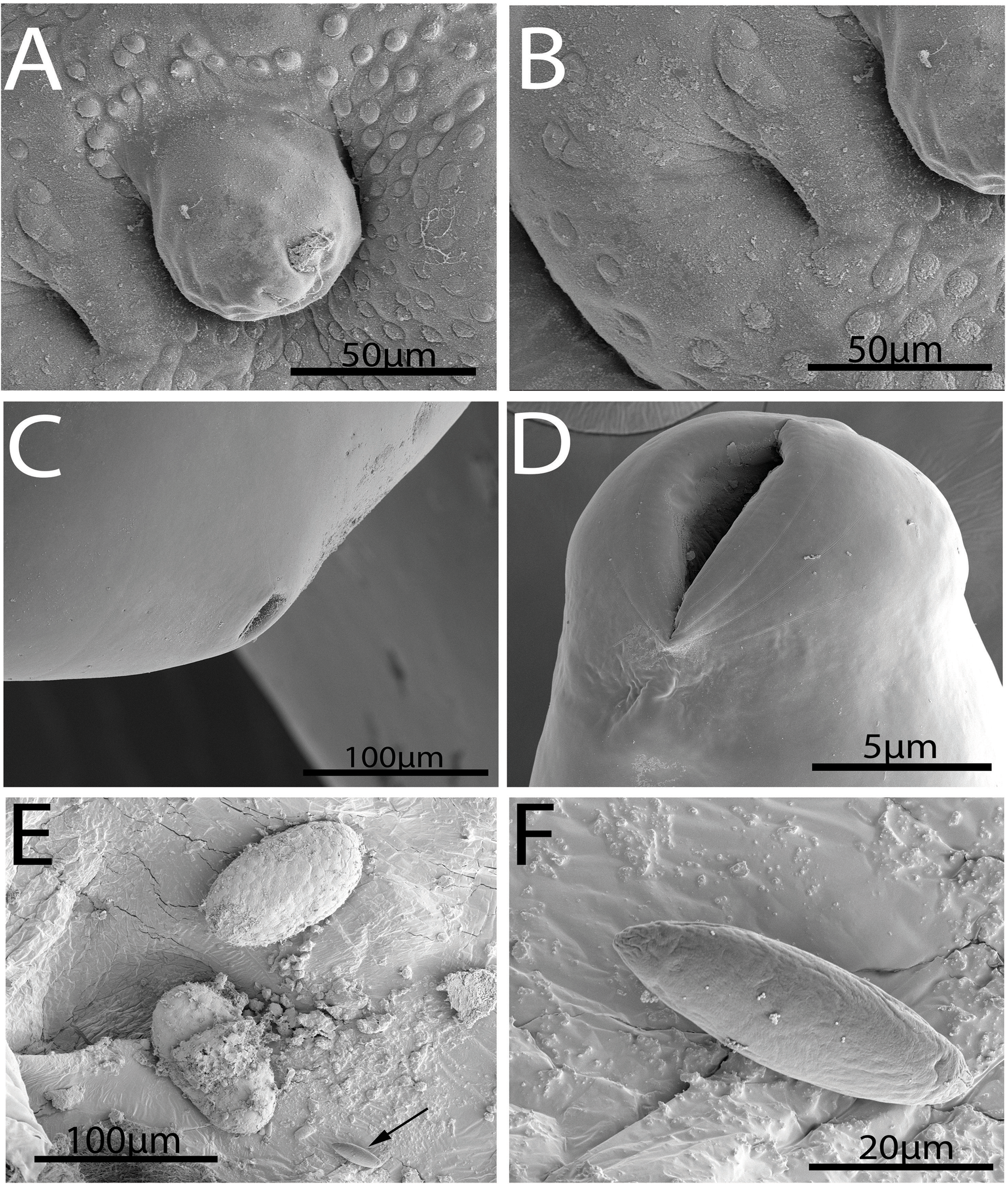
SEM of Rhadinorhynchus oligospinosus

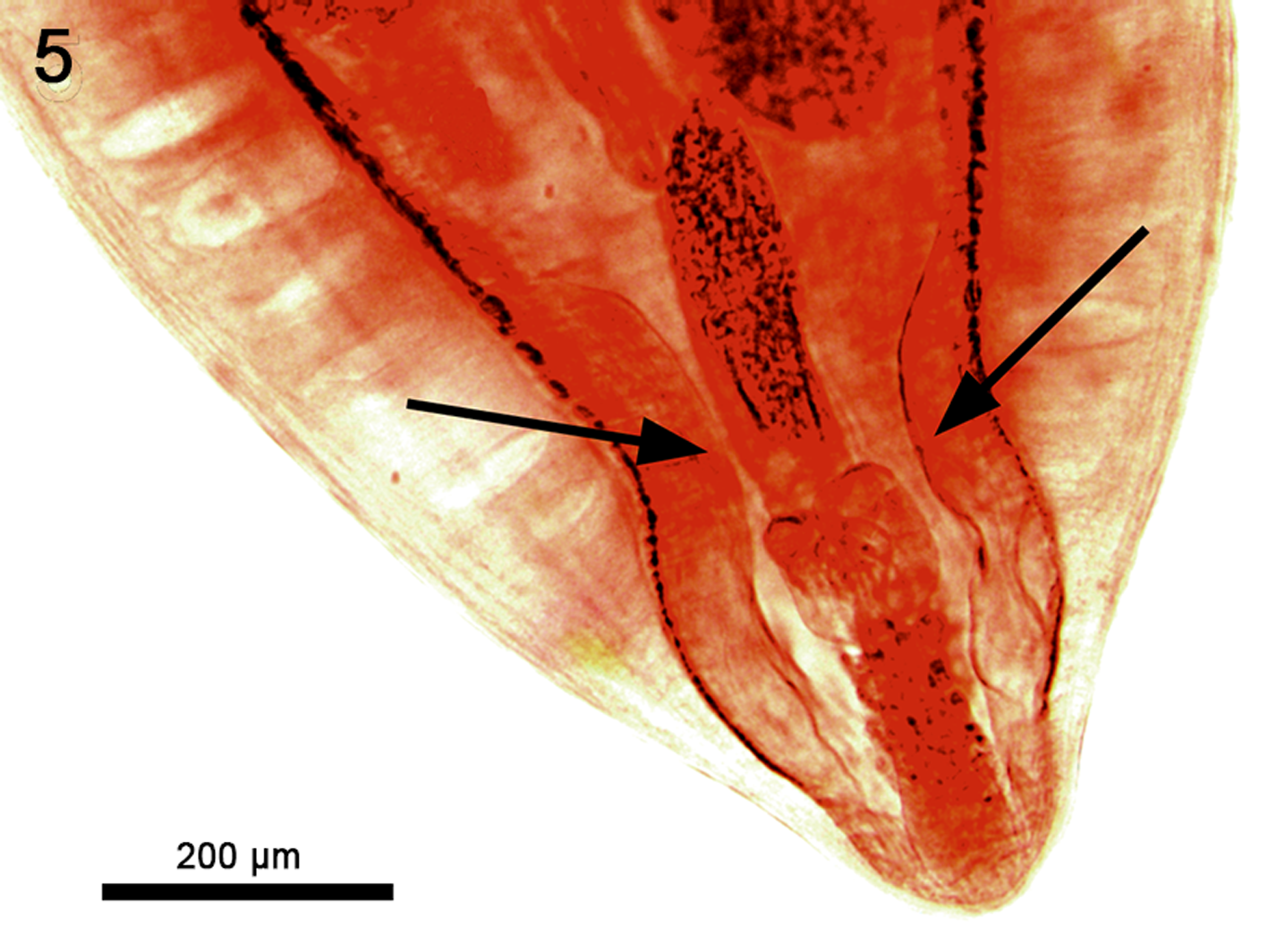
Posterior trunk of a female Cathayacanthus spinitruncatus

Rhadinorhynchidae is a family of parasitic worms from the order Echinorhynchida.

== Species ==
Rhadinorhynchidae has 4 subfamilies (Golvanacanthinae, Gorgorhynchinae, Rhadinorhynchinae, and Serrasentoidinae) and the following species: (Note: A binomial authority in parentheses indicates that the species was originally described in a genus other than the present genus.)

=== Golvanacanthinae Paggi and Orecchia, 1972 ===
==== Golvanacanthus ====
Golvanacanthus Paggi and Orecchia, 1972 contains one species:

- Golvanacanthus blennii Paggi and Orecchia, 1972

=== Gorgorhynchinae Van Cleave & Lincicome, 1940 ===
Australorhynchus Lebedev, 1967

- Australorhynchus tetramorphacanthus Lebedev, 1967

Cleaveius Subrahmanian, 1927

- Cleaveius circumspinifer Subrahmanian, 1927
- Cleaveius clupei (Gupta & Sinha, 1992)
- Cleaveius durdanae Kumar, 1992
- Cleaveius fotedari (Gupta & Naqvi, 1980)
- Cleaveius inglisi (Gupta & Fatma, 1987)
- Cleaveius leiognathi Jain & Gupta, 1979
- Cleaveius longirostris Moravec and Sey, 1989
- Cleaveius mysti (Sahay and Sinha, 1971)
- Cleaveius portblairensis Jain & Gupta, 1979
- Cleaveius prashadi (Datta, 1940)
- Cleaveius puriensis (Gupta & Sinha, 1992)
- Cleaveius secundus (Tripathi, 1959)
- Cleaveius singhai (Gupta & Fatma, 1987)
- Cleaveius thapari (Gupta & Naqvi, 1980)

Edmondsacanthus Smales, 2009

- Edmondsacanthus blairi Smales, 2009

Gorgorhynchus Chandler, 1934

- Gorgorhynchus celebesensis (Yamaguti, 1954)
- Gorgorhynchus clavatus Van Cleave, 1940
- Gorgorhynchus lepidus Van Cleave, 1940
- Gorgorhynchus medius (Linton, 1908) Chandler, 1934
- Gorgorhynchus nemipteri Parukhin, 1973
- Gorgorhynchus occultus Smales, Barton, and Chisholm

G. occultus has been found parasitising the Cobbler wobbegong (Sutorectus tentaculatus) in Bunbury, Western Australia. The proboscis of this worm has 18 to 20 rows of 8 or 9 hooks followed by a well-developed neck. The body contains irregular circles of small spines in a single anterior portion. The male reproductive system limited to the posterior quarter of the trunk. There are three cement glands.

- Gorgorhynchus ophiocephali Furtado & Lau, 1971
- Gorgorhynchus polymixiae Kovalenko, 1981
- Gorgorhynchus robertdollfusi Golvan, 1956
- Gorgorhynchus satoi Morisita, 1937
- Gorgorhynchus tonkinensis Amin & Ha, 2011
- Gorgorhynchus trachinotus Noronha, Vicente, Pinto & Fábio, 1986

Leptorhynchoides Kostylev, 1924

- Leptorhynchoides acanthidion Steinauer & Nickol, 2015
- Leptorhynchoides aphredoderi Buckner & Buckner, 1976
- Leptorhynchoides apoglyphicus Steinauer & Nickol, 2015
- Leptorhynchoides atlanteus Steinauer & Nickol, 2015
- Leptorhynchoides macrorchis Steinauer & Nickol, 2015
- Leptorhynchoides nebularosis Steinauer & Nickol, 2015
- Leptorhynchoides plagicephalus (Westrum, 1821)
- Leptorhynchoides polycristatus Amin, Heckmann, Halajian, El-Naggar & Tavakol, 2013
- Leptorhynchoides seminolus Steinauer & Nickol, 2015
- Leptorhynchoides thecatus (Linton, 1891) Kostylev, 1924

Metacanthocephaloides Yamaguti, 1959

- Metacanthocephaloides zebrini Yamaguti, 1959

Metacanthocephalus Yamaguti, 1959

- Metacanthocephalus campbelli (Leiper & Atkinson, 1914)
- Metacanthocephalus dalmori Zdzitowiecki, 1983
- Metacanthocephalus johnstoni Zdzitowiecki, 1983
- Metacanthocephalus ovicephalus (Zhukov, 1963)
- Metacanthocephalus pleuronichthydis Yamaguti, 1959
- Metacanthocephalus rennicki (Leiper & Atkinson, 1914)

Micracanthorhynchina Strand, 1936

- Micracanthorhynchina atherinomori Smales, 2014
- Micracanthorhynchina chandrai Bhattacharya, 2007
- Micracanthorhynchina cynoglossi Wang, 1980
- Micracanthorhynchina dakusuiensis (Harada, 1938)
- Micracanthorhynchina golvani Gupta & Sinha, 1992
- Micracanthorhynchina hemiculturus Demshin, 1965
- Micracanthorhynchina hemirhamphi (Baylis, 1944)
- Micracanthorhynchina indica Farooqi, 1980
- Micracanthorhynchina kuwaitensis Amin & Sey, 1996
- Micracanthorhynchina lateolabracis Wang, 1980
- Micracanthorhynchina motomurai (Harada, 1935)
- Micracanthorhynchina segmentata (Yamaguti, 1959)

Paracanthorhynchus Edmonds, 1967

- Paracanthorhynchus galaxiasus Edmonds, 1967

Pseudauchen Yamaguti, 1963

- Pseudauchen epinepheli (Yamaguti, 1939)

Pseudoleptorhynchoides Salgado-Maldonado, 1976

- Pseudoleptorhynchoides lamothei Salgado-Maldonado, 1976

=== Rhadinorhynchinae Lühe, 1912 ===
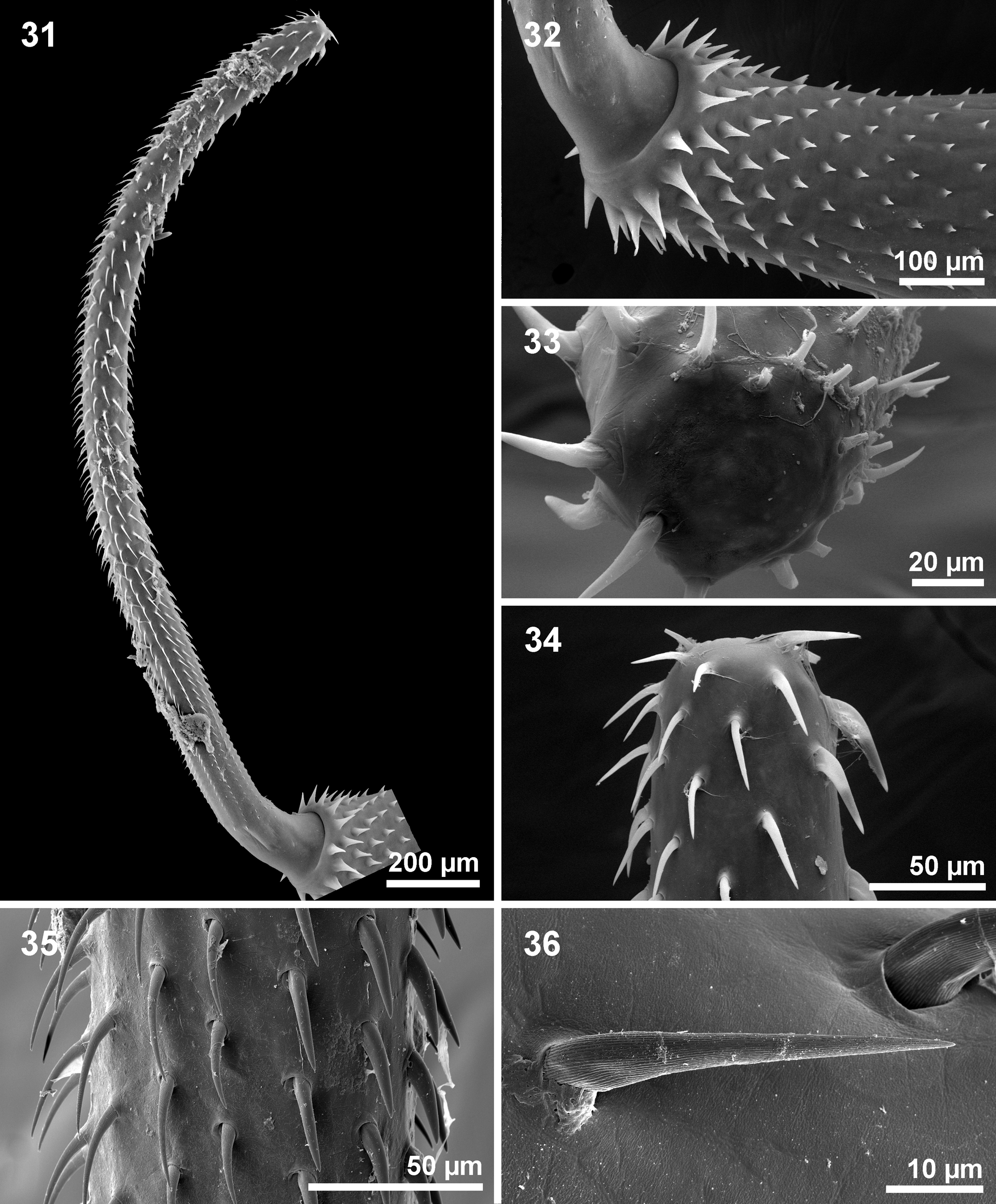
Scanning electron microscopy of proboscis of Cathayacanthus spinitruncatus

Cathayacanthus Golvan, 1969

- Cathayacanthus bagarii Moravec and Sey, 1989
- Cathayacanthus exilis (Van Cleave, 1928)
- Cathayacanthus spinitruncatus Amin, Heckmann & Ha, 2014

Megistacantha Golvan, 1960

- Megistacantha horridum (Lühe, 1912)
- Megistacantha sanghaensis Kvach, Jirků & Scholz, 2016

Paragorgorhynchus Golvan, 1957

- Paragorgorhynchus albertianus Golvan, 1957
- Paragorgorhynchus chariensis Troncy, 1970

Pseudogorgorhynchus Moravec, Wolter & Korting, 2000

- Pseudogorgorhynchus arii Moravec, Wolter & Korting, 2000

Raorhynchus Tripathi, 1959

- Raorhynchus cadenati Gupta & Sinha, 1992
- Raorhynchus guptai Gupta & Kumar, 1987
- Raorhynchus inexspectatus Golvan, 1969
- Raorhynchus megalaspisi Wang, Wang and Wu, 1993
- Raorhynchus mayeri (Heinz, 1934)
- Raorhynchus polynemi Tripathi, 1959
- Raorhynchus schmidti George & Nadakal, 1978
- Raorhynchus terebra Rudolphi, 1819
- Raorhynchus thapari Gupta & Fatma, 1981

Rhadinorhynchus Lühe, 1911

Worldwide distribution of Rhadinorhynchus samples collected in the field.
- Rhadinorhynchus africanus (Golvan, Houin and Deltour, 1963)
- Rhadinorhynchus atheri (Farooqui, 1981)
- Rhadinorhynchus bicircumspinis Hooper, 1983
- Rhadinorhynchus biformis Smales, 2014
- Rhadinorhynchus cadenati (Golvan & Houin, 1964)
- Rhadinorhynchus camerounensis Golvan, 1969
- Rhadinorhynchus capensis Bray, 1974
- Rhadinorhynchus carangis Yamaguti, 1939
- Rhadinorhynchus chongmingnensis Huang, Zheng, Deng, Fan and Ni, 1988
- Rhadinorhynchus cololabis Laurs & McCauley, 1964
- Rhadinorhynchus decapteri (Braicovich, Lanfranchi, Farber, Marvaldi, Luque and Timi, 2014) (Note: Gymnorhadinorhynchus decapteri was combined with Rhadinorhynchus decapteri based on genetic analysis. The original family and genus names are a combination of the Greek word gymnos (naked) and Rhadinorhynchidae/Rhadinorhynchus, a family/genus of similar morphology, but lacking somatic spines. A phylogenetic analysis had been conducted to confirm that Gymnorhadinorhynchus is a well supported clade within the monophyletic order Echinorhynchida but the new analysis superseded this one. Previously, Gymnorhadinorhynchidae can be distinguished from other families of Echinorhynchida by the combination of the following morphological characteristics: a cylindrical proboscis with longitudinal row of hooks, basal circle of hooks larger than anterior hooks, an absence of trunk spines, asymmetry of hook shape, four cement glands, and a spineless trunk.)

R. decapteri is a parasite of the marine fish Round scad (Decapterus punctatus) and is found coastal waters of Brazil. It has 10 longitudinal rows of 22–26 hooks. The species name decapteri was derived from the genus (Decapterus) of the type host.

- Rhadinorhynchus ditrematus Yamaguti, 1939
- Rhadinorhynchus dollfusi Gupta & Fatma, 1987
- Rhadinorhynchus dorsoventrospinosus Amin, Heckmann & Há, 2011
- Rhadinorhynchus dujardini Golvan, 1969
- Rhadinorhynchus echeneisi Gupta and Gupta, 1980
- Rhadinorhynchus erumeii (Gupta & Fatma, 1981)
- Rhadinorhynchus ganapatii Chandra, Hanumantha-Rao & Shyamasundari, 1985
- Rhadinorhynchus hiansi Soota & Bhattacharya, 1981
- Rhadinorhynchus japonicus Fujita, 1920
- Rhadinorhynchus johnstoni Golvan, 1969
- Rhadinorhynchus keralensis Gupta & Fatma, 1987
- Rhadinorhynchus laterospinosus Amin, Heckmann & Há, 2011
- Rhadinorhynchus lintoni Cable & Linderoth, 1963
- Rhadinorhynchus oligospinosus Amin & Heckmann, 2017
- Rhadinorhynchus mariserpentis (Steinauer, Garcia-Vedrenne, Weinstein & Kuris, 2019) (Note: Genetic analysis resulted in the move of Gymnorhadinorhynchus mariserpentis to the genus Rhadinorhynchus)

R. mariserpentis parasitizes the Oarfish, Regalecus russelii and has been collected near Wakamatsu-ku, Kitakyūshū, Japan.

- Rhadinorhynchus ornatus Van Cleave, 1918
- Rhadinorhynchus pelamysi Gupta & Gupta, 1980
- Rhadinorhynchus pichelinae Smales, 2014
- Rhadinorhynchus plagioscionis Thatcher, 1980
- Rhadinorhynchus plotosi Parukhin, 1985
- Rhadinorhynchus polydactyli Smales, 2014
- Rhadinorhynchus polynemi Gupta & Lata, 1967
- Rhadinorhynchus pomatomi Smales, 2014
- Rhadinorhynchus pristis (Rudolphi, 1802)
- Rhadinorhynchus saltatrix Troncy & Vassiliades, 1973
- Rhadinorhynchus selkirki Van Cleave, 1921
- Rhadinorhynchus seriolae (Yamaguti, 1963)
- Rhadinorhynchus stunkardii Gupta & Fatma, 1987
- Rhadinorhynchus trachuri Harada, 1935

R. trachuri is one of the most widespread acanthocephalans infesting fish from the Eastern Pacific, Western Pacific, and Indian Oceans. On the South pacific coast of Vietnam, it was found infesting the Frigate tuna (Auxis thazard), and the Torpedo scad (Megalaspis cordyla).

- Rhadinorhynchus trivandricus George & Nadkal, 1978
- Rhadinorhynchus vancleavei Golvan, 1969
- Rhadinorhynchus zhukovi Golvan, 1969

Slendrorhynchus Amin & Sey, 1996

- Slendrorhynchus breviclaviproboscis Amin & Sey, 1996

=== Serrasentoidinae Parukhin, 1982 ===
Serrasentoides Parukhin, 1971

- Serrasentoides fistulariae Parukhin, 1971

== Hosts ==
Rhadinorhynchidae species parasitize fish hosts.

Hosts for Rhadinorhynchidae species

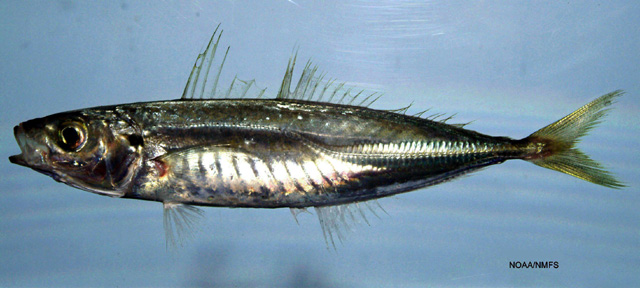
The Round scad is a host of Rhadinorhynchus decapteri

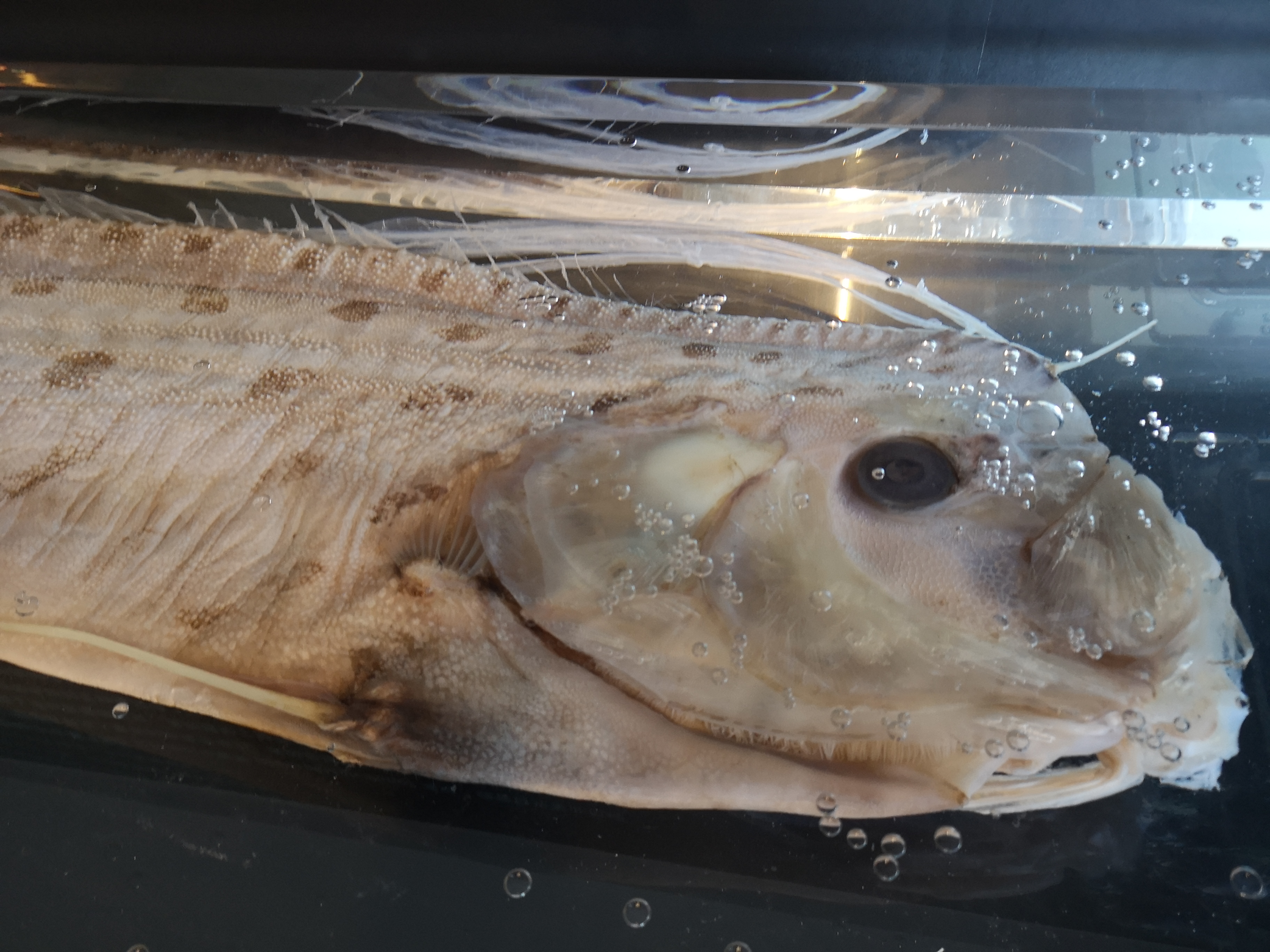
The oarfish Regalecus russelii is a host of Rhadinorhynchus mariserpentis
