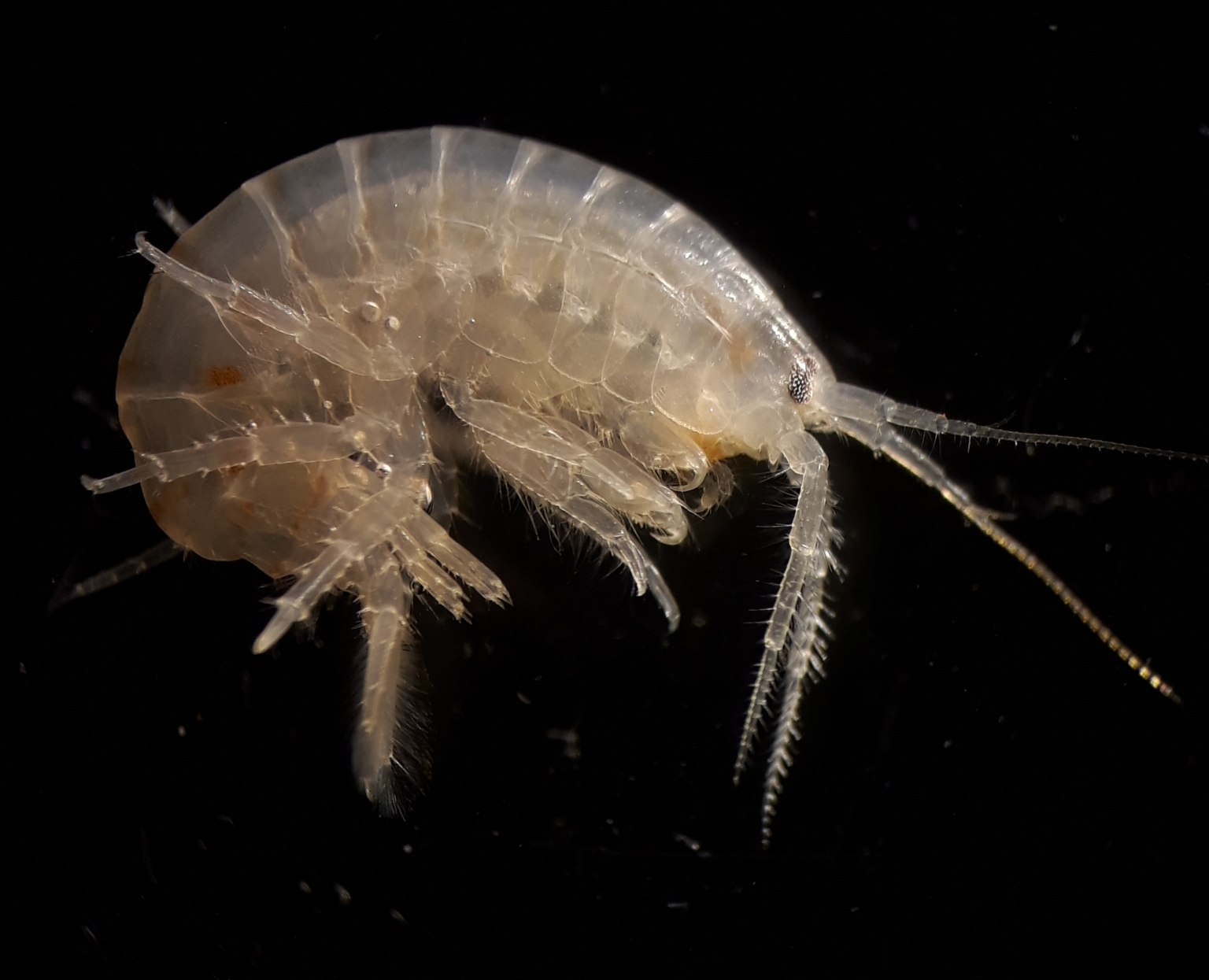

Scientific classification
- Kingdom: Animalia
- Phylum: Arthropoda
- Clade: Pancrustacea
- Class: Malacostraca
- Order: Amphipoda
- Family: Gammaridae
- Genus: Gammarus
- Species: G. pulex

Binomial name
- Gammarus pulex (Linnaeus, 1758)

Synonyms
- Cancer pulex Linnaeus, 1758; Rivulogammarus pulex (Linnaeus, 1758) [nom. inval.]

= Gammarus pulex =

Species of crustacean

Gammarus pulex is a species of crustacean found across much of Europe. It is a benthic (bottom-dwelling) amphipod, typically measuring 10–20 mm in length, that is greyish in color and lives in freshwater habitats.

== Description ==
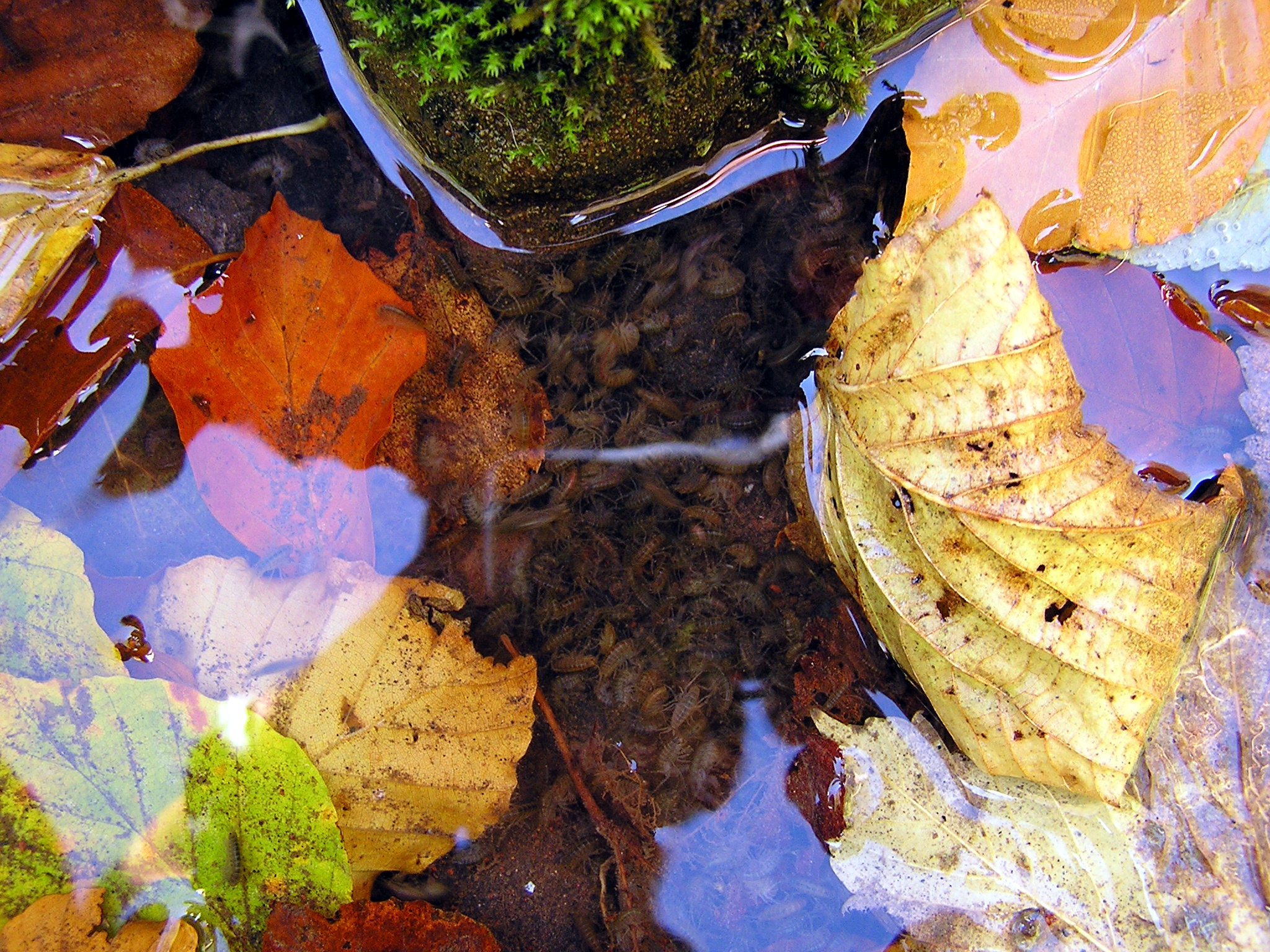
In Vogelsberg, Germany

Adults of the species are generally a translucent gray color with brown or green markings which vary with habitat, age, and diet. An example of this includes G. pulex individuals that live in caves; these are affected by their environment and have much less coloration than those at the surface. Infection by the endo-parasitic worm P. laevis is especially prevalent in this species and is indicated by a bright orange color in their gills.

=== Sexual dimorphism ===
Gammarus pulex display sexual dimorphism at maturity. Males of the species grow to 21 mm (0.83 in) while females grow to about to 14 mm (0.55 in). Beyond size, males also possess a larger second gnathopod, which is a defining feature of mature males.

=== Anatomy ===
G. pulex has compound eyes, two pairs of antennae, and seven pairs of thoracic limbs. The first two thoracic limbs on the amphipod are called gnathopods for feeding and mating. G. pulex has gills on the abdomen to breathe, and, as a crustacean, has an open circulatory and nervous system. They are able to sense and respond to light, vibrations, and chemical cues from the environment.

=== Taxonomic history ===
Gammarus pulex was first described by Linnaeus in 1758 in his tenth edition of Systema Naturae, and is the type species for the genus Gammarus. Linnaeus was originally called the species Cancer pulex, using a vague and extremely general description of amphipods. The name was revised in 1970 when the species was redescribed and more thoroughly differentiated by the relative lengths of antennae and the shape of the uropod. G. pulex has been classified as a part of the family Gammaridae in the order Amphipoda. Additionally, some species of the genus Gammarus have been called by the name Rivogammarus for further categorization, with the G. pulex being called Rivulogammarus pulex. However, this name is not valid nomenclature under the International Code of Zoological Nomenclature due to the fact that G. pulex is the type species for Gammarus, requiring it to contain that genus name.

== Life cycle ==
Gammarus pulex reproduce sexually, typically producing several broods per year depending on water temperature and food availability. Mating and fertilization occur immediately after the female molts and releases her eggs. Before mating, males will grasp females in a "precopulatory" position for hours or days, guarding her from other males. Females then carry developing embryos in a ventral brood pouch until they hatch into their juvenile forms. G. pulex usually lives about a year in temperate climates, but can survive through up to two winters.

=== Diet ===
Gammarus pulex is a detritivore, feeding on dead organic material. In natural environment, it primarily feeds on decomposing leaves and microorganisms such as fungi and bacteria. Specifically, G. pulex has been found to prefers conditioned leaves, leaves that have been colonized by microorganisms, likely due to improved the nutritional quality and digestibility. Juvenile G. pulex engage in coprophagy, as they feed on adult feces until they have matured enough to eat the conditioned leaves. This, along with the fact that they break down detritus into more accessible forms for the wider aquatic ecosystem, demonstrates the contributions G. pulex makes to nutrient cycling within their environments. In a laboratory setting with scarce resources, G. pulex also shown evidence of cannibalism.

The feeding rates of G. pulex vary depending on substrate type and temperature. Field studies have shown that feeding activity is normally highest at night during lower light hours, reducing exposure and visibility to predators.

=== Predation ===
Predators of Gammarus pulex include fish, birds, and other larger invertebrates. G. pulex has multiple behavioral and physiological defenses to mitigate this risk, including nocturnal activity, shelter construction, and camouflage. In order to evade predation, G. pulex primarily takes refuge in darker, more shaded areas during the daylight hours, staying active more during the nighttime. G. pulex also attempts to shelter in leaves and other submerged vegetation, since their coloration usually resembles the vegetation, offering acryptic advantage. Diverse predation threats have led to varying behavioral adaptions. For example, populations exposed to fish predators were less active and spend more time hiding and taking refuge compared to those with invertebrate predators. However, this behavior may change in response to parasite infection, as seen with the Pomphorhynchus laevis infection which causes its host to behave in a way that increases their chance of predation.

== Distribution ==
Gammarus pulex is found in most of Europe from the Atlantic to the Volga River drainage. It is native mostly to Western and Central Europe, but has been introduced to freshwater ecosystems outside its native range by human intervention, such as in parts of Ireland where it is replacing the native Gammarus duebeni. However, it has not been found in areas of northern Europe such as Norway and Scotland due to geographical barriers and competition.

=== Habitat ===
The primary habitat for Gammarus pulex is running freshwater systems with high oxygen levels, such as streams, rivers, springs, and sometimes lakes with in and outflow currents. Its habitat selection is influenced by the water flow, temperature, and presence of shelter. G. pulex prefers stoney substrates to allow for better camouflage from predators. During the day, individuals occupy more deep and shaded areas, while at night they tend to forage in the open areas.

=== Abundance ===
Gammarus pulex is widespread and abundant, expanding beyond its natural range and often outcompeting and displacing other native Gammarus species, such as is the case in northern Ireland with the native Gammarus duebeni. These invasions often occur through human intervention in the environment. While G. pulex remains abundant, local populations can decline due to their sensitivity to water quality and pollution. Due to this sensitivity along with its taxonomic importance as a type species, G. pulex has been used as a reliable biomonitor for stream quality in regard to pollution, oxygen depletion, and chemical contamination.

== Behavior ==
Gammarus pulex follows both 24-hour and seasonal behavior patterns. Individuals have a nocturnal schedule, reducing movement during daylight hours and increasing activity at night. In terms of movement, G. pulex tends to show passive movement and drift behavior, especially among juveniles and during disturbances.

=== Aggression ===
During mating, G. pulex males will often show aggression during mate guarding, or precopulatory guarding, in order to increase his chance of fertilizing eggs. Males grasp females with their gnathopods prior to the female molting and releasing of eggs, sometimes fighting off other males. Environmental factors such as resource availability can increase aggressive encounters, with cannibalism being seen in lab environments.

=== Parasitic influence ===
The species Gammarus pulex is known to be infected by several types of acanthocephalan and microsporidian parasites, including Pomphorhynchus laevis, Polymorphus minutus, and Pomphorhynchus tereticollis, that can affect their host's behavior. These changes in behavior include responses to light and smell. P. laevis can cause G. pulex to seek out light and fish odors, instead of avoiding them as they would when uninfected. Additionally, P. laevis causes G. pulex to turn a bright orange color in contrast to their usual light greyish color, making the host more visible and vulnerable to predators. This increased risk of predation allows for more chances for transmission to other organisms.
