= Pyrirhynchus =

Scientific classification
- Kingdom: Animalia
- Phylum: Acanthocephala
- Class: Palaeacanthocephala
- Order: Heteramorphida; Amin and Ha, 2008
- Family: Pyrirhynchidae; Amin and Ha, 2008
- Genus: Pyrirhynchus; Amin and Ha, 2008
- Species: P. heterospinus

Binomial name
- Pyrirhynchus heterospinus Amin and Ha, 2008

Genus of thorny-headed worms

Pyrirhynchus is a genus of thorny-headed worms. It is the only genus in the order Heteramorphida and family Pyrirhynchidae. It contains a single species Pyrirhynchus heterospinus. It was found in the common sandpiper (Actitis hypoleucos) in Quang Ninh Province, Vietnam. The proboscis contains 17 to 20 rows of 17 to 19 hooks each, with anterior 9-11 hooks rooted and posterior 6-10 spines without roots.
