= Pomphorhynchus =

Scientific classification
- Domain: Eukaryota
- Kingdom: Animalia
- Phylum: Rotifera
- Class: Palaeacanthocephala
- Order: Echinorhynchida
- Family: Pomphorhynchidae
- Genus: Pomphorhynchus; Monticelli, 1905

Genus of worms

Pomphorhynchus is a genus of parasitic worms belonging to the family Pomphorhynchidae.

The species of this genus are found in Europe and Northern America.

Species:

- Pomphorhynchus bosniacus Kistaroly & Cankovic, 1969
- Pomphorhynchus bufonis Fotedar, Duda & Raina, 1970
- Pomphorhynchus bulbocolli Linkins, 1919
- Pomphorhynchus bullocki Gupta and Lata, 1968
- Pomphorhynchus cylindrica Wang and Gu, 1983
- Pomphorhynchus dubious Kaw, 1941
- Pomphorhynchus francoisae Golvan, 1969
- Pomphorhynchus jammuensis Fotedar and Dhar, 1977
- Pomphorhynchus kashmirensis Kaw, 1941
- Pomphorhynchus kawi Fotedar, Duda and Raina, 1970
- Pomphorhynchus kostylewi Petrochenko, 1956
- Pomphorhynchus laevis (Zoega in Müller, 1776)

P. laevis is a parasitic acanthocephalan worm that can influence the reaction of its intermediate host, the freshwater amphipod Gammarus pulex, to the smell of potential predators like perch, Perca fluviatilis. P. laevis facilitates its movement from its initial host. Research has demonstrated that organisms affected by the parasite exhibit a diminished or inverted avoidance response to the scent of predators when compared to uninfested specimens, supporting the notion that the parasite manipulates its host, with the goal of passing itself on to its definitive host, a freshwater fish. Affected specimens also demonstrate vibrant changes in color, making them more visible to predators. This worm swells its proboscis to press microneedles into the intestinal wall, with a very strong adhesive force. This has inspired a structural skin graft adhesive that sticks strongly but has minimal tissue damage while in place and upon removal.

- Pomphorhynchus lucyi Williams & Rogers, 1984
- Pomphorhynchus megacanthus Fotedar and Dhar, 1977
- Pomphorhynchus moyanoi Olmes and Habit, 2007
- Pomphorhynchus omarsegundoi Arredondo and Gil de Pertierra, 2010
- Pomphorhynchus oreini Fotedar and Dhar, 1977
- Pomphorhynchus orientalis Fotedar and Dhar, 1977
- Pomphorhynchus patagonicus Ortubay, Ubeda, Semenas and Kennedy, 1991
- Pomphorhynchus perforator (von Linstow, 1908)
- Pomphorhynchus purhepechus García-Varela, Mendoza-Garfias, Choudhury & Pérez-Ponce de León, 2017
- Pomphorhynchus rocci Cordonnier & Ward, 1967
- Pomphorhynchus sebastichthydis Yamaguti, 1939
- Pomphorhynchus sphaericus Pertierra, Spatz and Doma, 1996
- Pomphorhynchus spindletruncatus Amin, Abdullah and Mhaisen, 2003
- Pomphorhynchus tereticollis (Rudolphi, 1809)
- Pomphorhynchus tori Fotedar and Dhar, 1977
- Pomphorhynchus yamagutii Schmidt and Higgins, 1973
- Pomphorhynchus yunnanensis Wang, 1981
- Pomphorhynchus zhoushanensis Li, Chen, Amin & Yang, 2017
