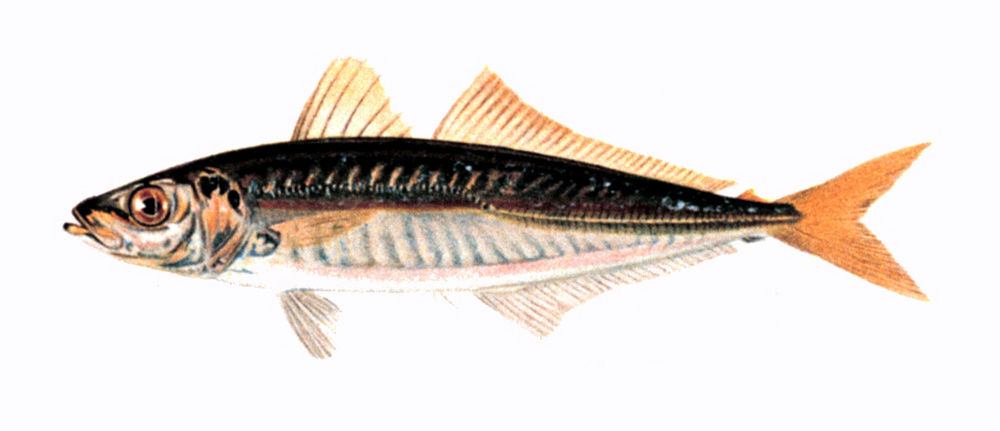

Conservation status
- Least Concern (IUCN 3.1)

Scientific classification
- Kingdom: Animalia
- Phylum: Chordata
- Class: Actinopterygii
- Division: Teleostei
- Order: Carangiformes
- Suborder: Carangoidei
- Family: Carangidae
- Genus: Decapterus
- Species: D. punctatus

Binomial name
- Decapterus punctatus (G. Cuvier, 1829)

Synonyms
- Caranx punctatus Cuvier, 1829; Caranx sanctaehelenae Cuvier, 1833; Decapterus sanctaehelenae (Cuvier, 1833)

= Round scad =

Species of fish

The round scad (Decapterus punctatus) (or cigar minnow) is a species of fish in the Carangidae. It was described in 1829 by the French naturalist and zoologist, Georges Cuvier. Although the round scad is considered a good food fish, it is mostly caught for use as bait.

== Description ==
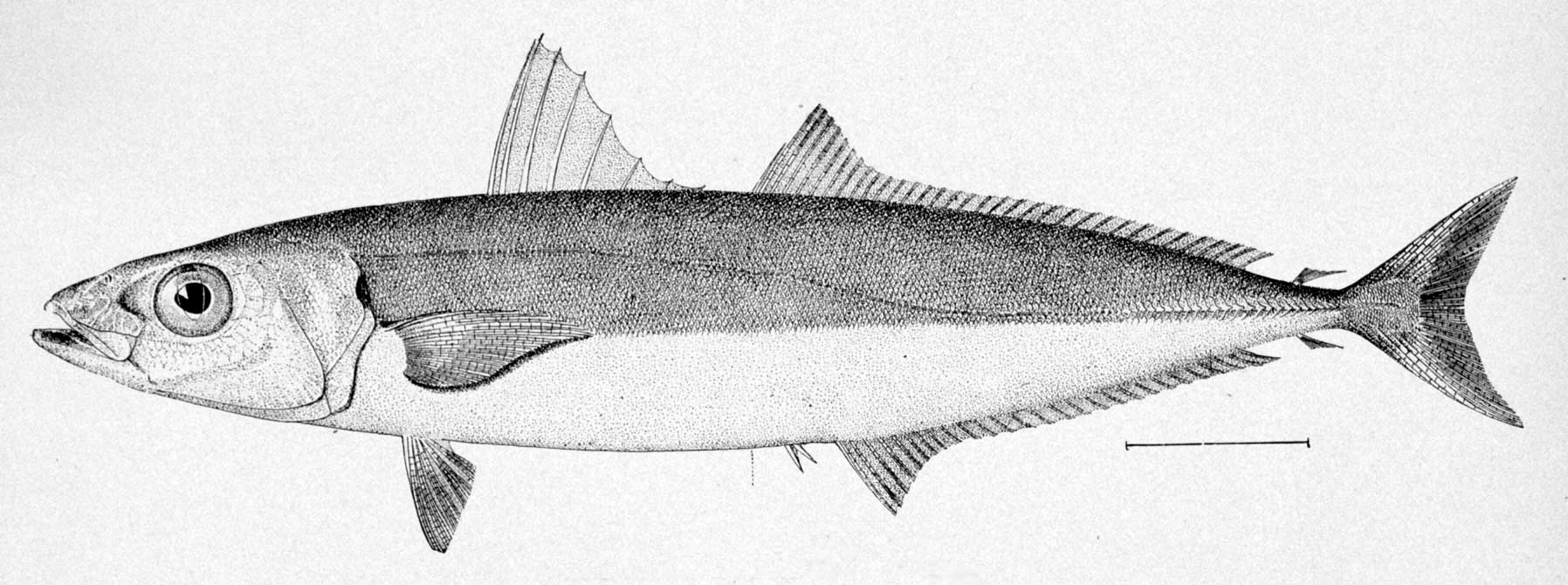
An illustration of the round scad

The round scad is a cigar-shaped fish, with greenish coloration on top and white below. Their opercles usually have a small, black spot. The round scad has nine spines on its dorsal fin and 30 to 34 soft rays. Their anal fins have only three spines and 26–29 soft rays. Round scad often have a yellow stripe running from the head to the caudal peduncle. The longest round scad recorded was 30 centimeters long, which is not far from the average estimated adult length of 12 inches (30.48 cm). It is claimed that the heaviest recorded specimen weighed 300 grams.

== Distribution and habitat ==
Known only from the Atlantic Ocean, the round scad is known from Nova Scotia in the north to Rio de Janeiro in the south, including the Caribbean Sea and Gulf of Mexico on the western side. On the eastern side, they are known from Morocco in the north to South Africa in the south, including the islands of Madeira, the Canary Islands, Cape Verde, Ascension Island and St. Helena.

Round scad make their home in the ocean's Neritic zone and are also common near beaches. They are also known to gather near the bottom in large shoals. Round scad mostly eat copepods, but have also been known to eat pteropods, ostracods, and gastropod larvae.

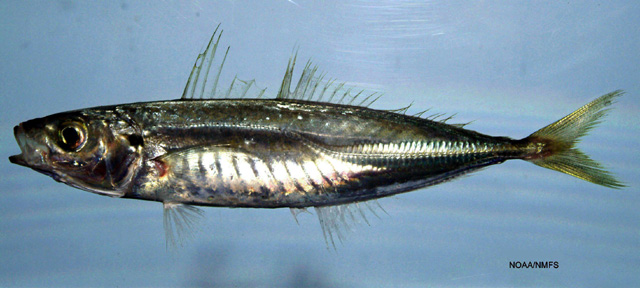
D. punctatus collected in the Gulf of Mexico.

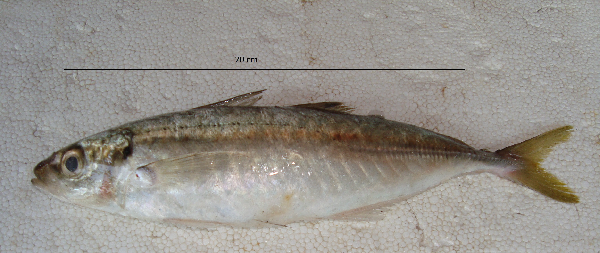
Similar specimen collected near Santos, Brazil.

== Reproduction ==
Round scad spawn year-round in waters well offshore. Their eggs float in pelagic waters before hatching.
