= Cement glands =

Small organs in thorny-headed worms

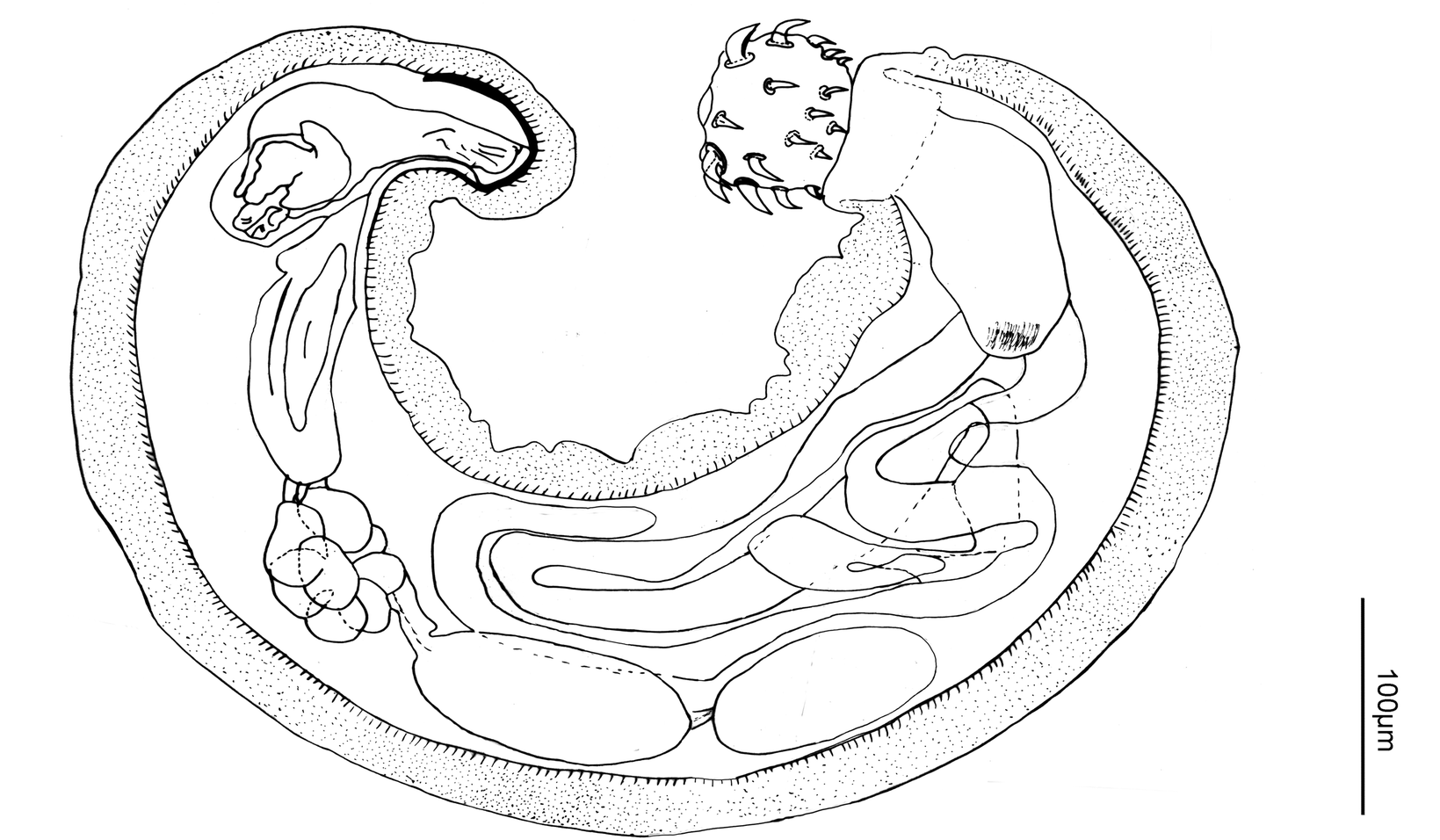
Diagram of a male P. lauroi showing the anterior and posterior testes, and eight cement glands in a clustered arrangement.

Cement glands are small organs found in Acanthocephala that are used to temporarily close the posterior end of the female after copulation.

Cement glands are also mucus-secreting organs that can attach embryos or larvae to a solid substrate. These can be found in frogs such as those in the genus Xenopus, fish such as the Mexican tetra, and crustaceans.
