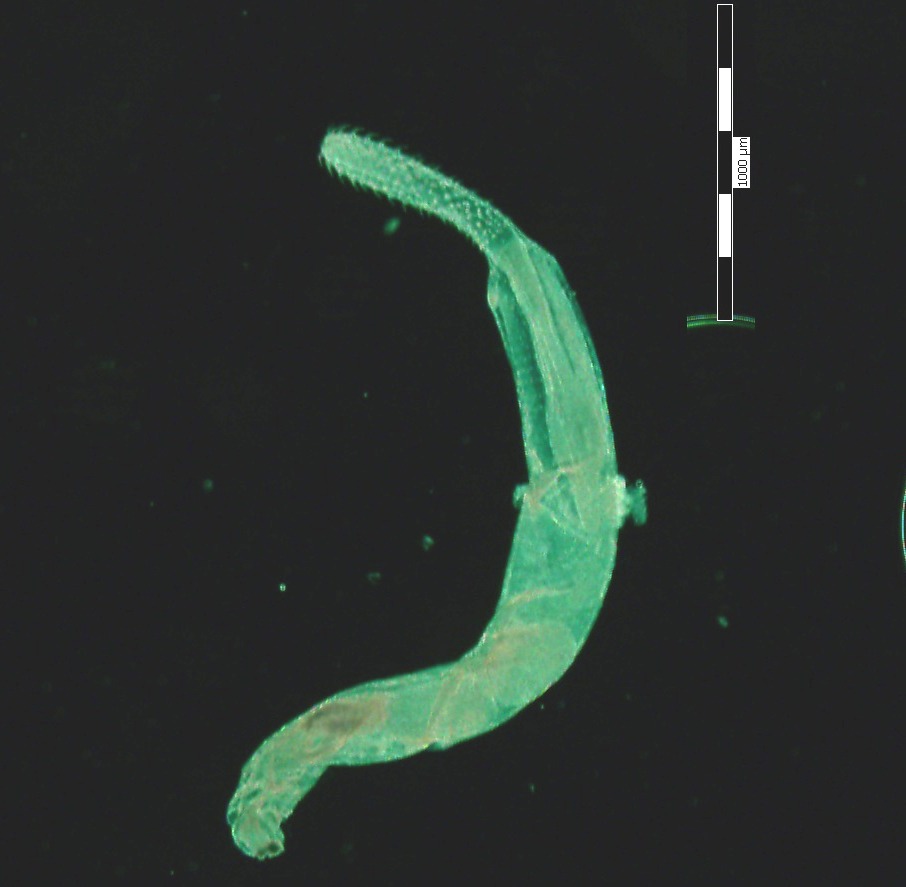
- Telosentis exiguus

Scientific classification
- Domain: Eukaryota
- Kingdom: Animalia
- Phylum: Acanthocephala
- Class: Palaeacanthocephala
- Order: Echinorhynchida; Petrochenko, 1956

= Echinorhynchida =

Order of thorny-headed worms

Echinorhynchida, from Ancient Greek ἐχῖνος (ekhînos), meaning "hedgehog", and ῥύγχος (rhúnkhos), meaning "snout", is an order of parasitic worms in the phylum Acanthocephala. It contains 13 known families:

- Arhythmacanthidae Yamaguti, 1935
- Cavisomidae Meyer, 1932
- Diplosentidae Tubangui and Masiluñgan, 1937
- Echinorhynchidae Cobbold, 1876
- Fessisentidae Van Cleave, 1931
- Gymnorhadinorhynchidae Braicovich, Lanfranchi, Farber, Marvaldi, Luque and Timi, 2014
- Heteracanthocephalidae Petrochenko, 1956
- Illiosentidae Golvan, 1960
- Isthmosacanthidae Smales, 2012
- Pomphorhynchidae Yamaguti, 1939
- Rhadinorhynchidae Lühe, 1912
- Sauracanthorhynchidae Bursey, Goldberg and Kraus, 2007
- Transvenidae Pichelin and Cribb, 2001
