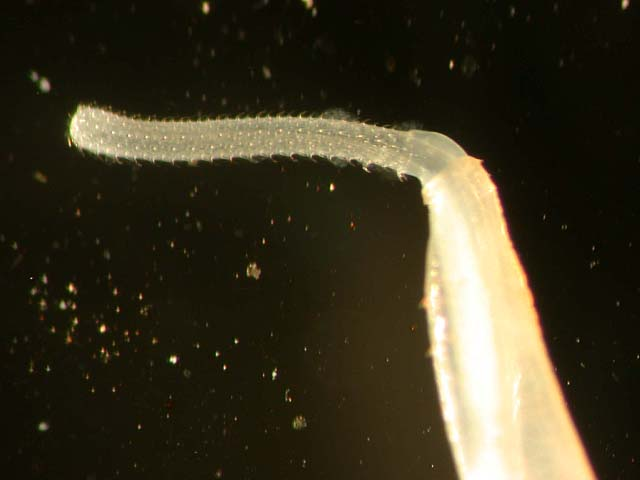
- Proboscis of a Rhadinorhynchus species

Scientific classification
- Kingdom: Animalia
- Phylum: Acanthocephala
- Class: Palaeacanthocephala; Meyer, 1931

Orders
- Echinorhynchida; Heteramorphida; Polymorphida

= Palaeacanthocephala =

Class of thorny-headed worms

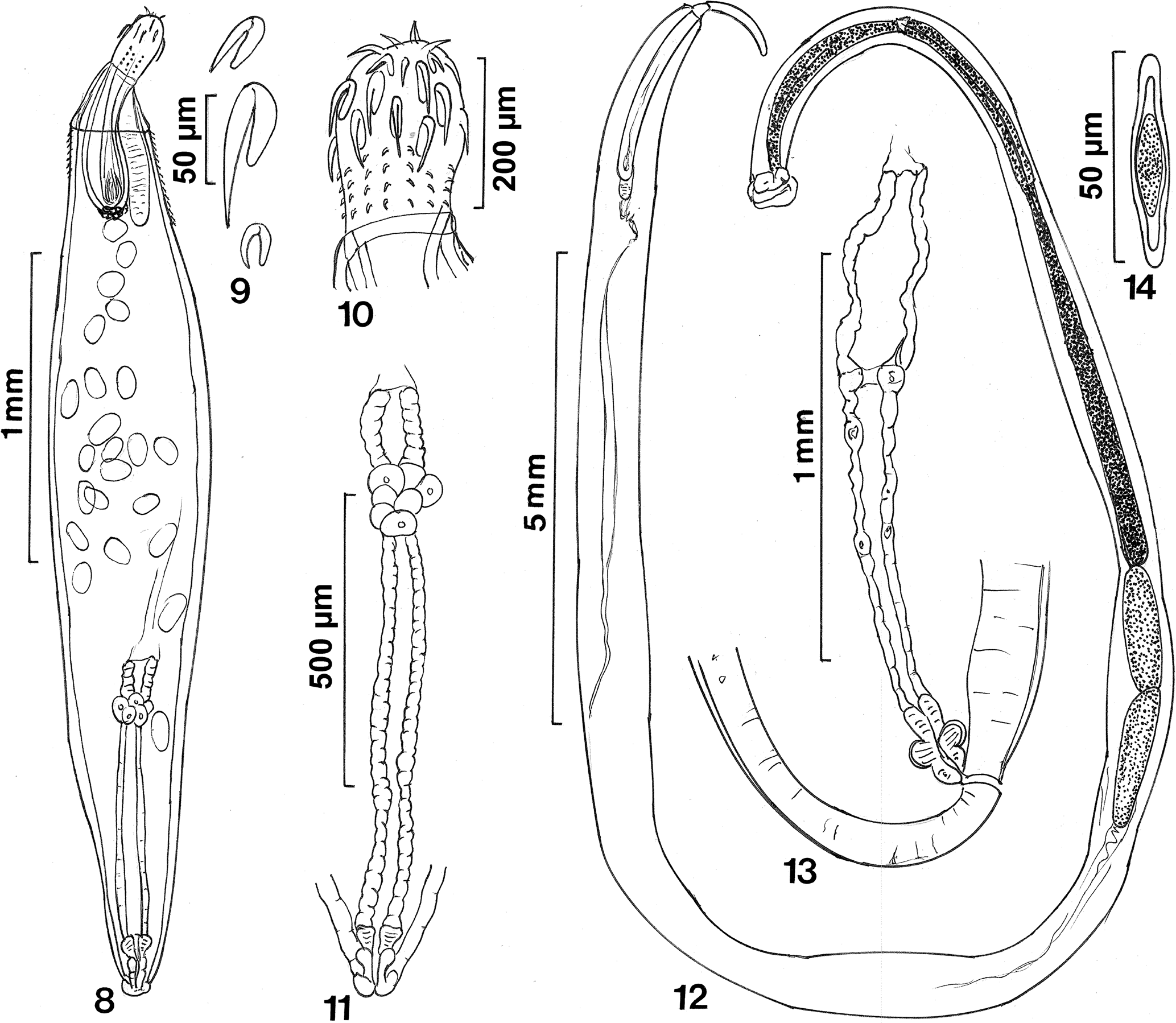
Two paleoacanthocephalans, Heterosentis mongcai Amin, Heckmann & Ha, 2014 and Filisoma indicum Van Cleave, 1928

Palaeacanthocephala ("ancient thornheads") is a class within the phylum Acanthocephala. The adults of these parasitic platyzoans feed mainly on fish, aquatic birds and mammals. This order is characterized by the presence of lateral longitudinal lacunar canals and a double-walled proboscis receptacle. The nuclei of the hypodermis (outer layer of skin) are fragmented and the males have two to seven cement glands, unlike their relatives the Archiacanthocephala, which always have eight.

There are three orders in the class Palaeacanthocephala:

- Echinorhynchida Southwell and Macfie, 1925
- Heteramorphida Amin and Ha, 2008
- Polymorphida Petrochenko, 1956
