= Steven J. R. Allain =

Steven J. R. Allain is a British herpetologist, conservation biologist and academic specialising in the ecology and conservation of amphibians and reptiles. His research has focused particularly on British herpetofauna, emerging infectious diseases, introduced species, amphibian bioacoustics, population monitoring and population genetics. He is a Senior Lecturer in Animal Science at Anglia Ruskin University and has been involved in wildlife recording and conservation organisations including the British Herpetological Society and the IUCN Species Survival Commission Amphibian Specialist Group.

Allain has undertaken research on diseases affecting British reptiles and amphibians, including ophidiomycosis, and has conducted long-term monitoring of introduced populations of the common midwife toad (Alytes obstetricans) in Great Britain. He received the National Biodiversity Network Award for Wildlife Recording – Terrestrial in 2022 for his contribution to recording and verifying amphibian and reptile records in several English counties.

== Education ==
Allain studied zoology at Anglia Ruskin University, where he obtained a Bachelor of Science degree. He subsequently completed a Master of Research degree in ecology, Evolution and Conservation at Imperial College London. He completed a Doctor of Philosophy in Biodiversity Management at the University of Kent. His doctoral research investigated the population dynamics and health of the barred grass snake (Natrix helvetica), with particular attention to disease and the ecology of wild snake populations.

== Academic career ==
Allain joined Anglia Ruskin University as a lecturer in animal science in 2023. His academic work is based within the Writtle School of Agriculture, Animal and Environmental Sciences. His teaching and research interests include animal science, conservation, herpetology and wildlife health. According to the university, his research interests include emerging infectious diseases of herpetofauna, introduced amphibians and reptiles, herpetological survey techniques, amphibian bioacoustics and population genetics and genomics. Before his appointment at Anglia Ruskin University, Allain was associated with the University of Kent's Durrell Institute of Conservation and Ecology and the Institute of Zoology of the Zoological Society of London.

== Research ==
=== British herpetofauna ===
A significant part of Allain's work has concerned the distribution, ecology and conservation of British amphibians and reptiles. He has participated in wildlife recording and verification schemes and has worked with local amphibian and reptile groups in England. His research and recording activities have included native British species as well as introduced and non-native amphibians and reptiles. Among the subjects of his work have been midwife toads, great crested newts, grass snakes, terrapins and other non-native herpetofauna.

Allain has undertaken long-term monitoring of midwife toad populations in Great Britain. The species was introduced to Britain and has established several feral populations. His research has examined the history and provenance of these populations, including the use of genetic techniques to investigate their origins.

=== Wildlife recording ===
Allain has been active in biological recording and the verification of amphibian and reptile records. His recording work has included Bedfordshire, Cambridgeshire, Norfolk and Kent. In 2022 he received the National Biodiversity Network Award for Wildlife Recording – Terrestrial. The award recognised his work generating and verifying amphibian and reptile records and sharing those records with local recording groups and conservation organisations. He has worked with local Amphibian and Reptile Groups to improve knowledge of the distribution of native and introduced herpetofauna. Allain has been involved with the organisation and operation of the Cambridgeshire and Peterborough Amphibian and Reptile Group, Norfolk Amphibian and Reptile Group and Bedfordshire Reptile and Amphibian Group.

=== Emerging infectious diseases ===
A major area of Allain's research has been the study of emerging infectious diseases affecting amphibians and reptiles. He co-authored a review of emerging infectious disease threats to European herpetofauna, covering amphibian pathogens including Batrachochytrium dendrobatidis, Batrachochytrium salamandrivorans and ranaviruses, as well as reptile diseases including ophidiomycosis. His subsequent research has examined Ophidiomyces ophidiicola, the fungal pathogen responsible for ophidiomycosis, also known as snake fungal disease. A 2024 study involving Allain investigated the prevalence and severity of skin lesions associated with the disease in a population of wild snakes. Allain has also written about the presence of Ophidiomyces ophidiicola in Britain and its significance as a cause of ophidiomycosis in British snakes.

=== Amphibian conservation ===
Allain's conservation research has included both in situ and ex situ approaches to amphibian conservation. His interests include population monitoring, disease surveillance, captive breeding and the conservation of threatened amphibian populations. His work has also included research into the use of acoustic methods for detecting and monitoring amphibians. Bioacoustics is particularly relevant to species such as frogs and toads because many species can be detected and identified through their advertisement calls. Allain co-authored the scientific description of Pseudoacanthocephalus goodmani, a previously undescribed species of parasitic acanthocephalan (spiny-headed worm) discovered in the introduced guttural toad (Sclerophrys gutturalis) population in Mauritius.

== Professional activities ==
Allain has published a number of peer-reviewed scientific papers on aspects of amphibian and reptile conservation, the impacts of emerging infectious disease, palaeontology and other topics related to his research interests. As of the 1 November 2026, Allain has 441 citations for his published work according to Google Scholar.

=== Professional organisations ===
Allain is a member of the British Herpetological Society and has served on its council and as a trustee. He is Fellow of the Linnean Society of London, a Fellow of the Zoological Society of London and a Fellow of the Higher Education Authority. He is also a member of the British Ecological Society, the British Mycological Society, the Natural Sciences Collections Association, the Royal Society of Biology, the Society for the History of Natural History, and the IUCN SSC Amphibian and Snake Specialist Groups. He has served as an editor of Reptiles and Amphibians and has contributed to scientific and natural-history publications concerning amphibians, reptiles, conservation and wildlife recording.

== Awards and recognition ==
In 2022 Allain received the National Biodiversity Network Award for Wildlife Recording – Terrestrial. The award was presented at the Natural History Museum in London as part of the 2022 NBN Awards for Wildlife Recording. The University of Kent reported that the award recognised Allain's contribution to generating and verifying amphibian and reptile records across several English counties. The British Herpetological Society subsequently reported his completion of his PhD at the University of Kent and his receipt of the NBN award.

== Selected publications ==
- Allain, Steven J. R.; Duffus, Amanda L. J. (2019). "Emerging infectious disease threats to European herpetofauna". Herpetological Journal. 29 (4): 189–206. doi:10.33256/hj29.4.189206.
- Allain, Steven J. R.; Gandola, Robert; Tighe, Andrew; Wilkinson, John W. (2019). "An investigation into the provenance of Bedford's midwife toads". Bedfordshire Naturalist. 74 (1): 48–54.
- Allain, Steven J. R.; Leech, David I.; Hopkins, Kevin; Seilern-Moy, Katharina; Rodriguez-Ramos Fernandez, Julia; Griffiths, Richard A.; Lawson, Becki (2024). "Characterisation, prevalence and severity of skin lesions caused by ophidiomycosis in a population of wild snakes". Scientific Reports. 14 (1): 5162. doi:10.1038/s41598-024-55354-5.
- Allain, Steven J. R. (2024). "A beep in the dark: 120 years of the Common Midwife Toad in Britain". British Wildlife. 35 (6): 401–406.
- Allain, Steven J. R.; Leech, Tony (2024). "Ophidiomyces ophidiicola in Britain, the cause of ophidiomycosis (snake fungal disease)". Field Mycology. 25 (3): 102–104.

== Books ==
- Allain, Steven, J. R. (2027). Reptiles: 10 Things You Should Know. London: Orion Publishing Group. ISBN 978-1-3996-4455-6.

== See also ==
- Herpetology
- Amphibian conservation
- British Herpetological Society
- National Biodiversity Network
- Ophidiomycosis
- Common midwife toad
- British reptiles
