= Centrorhynchus (worm) =

Scientific classification
- Kingdom: Animalia
- Phylum: Acanthocephala
- Class: Palaeacanthocephala
- Order: Polymorphida
- Family: Centrorhynchidae
- Genus: Centrorhynchus; Lühe, 1911

Genus of worms

Centrorhynchus is a genus of parasitic worms belonging to the family Centrorhynchidae.

The genus has cosmopolitan distribution.

Species:

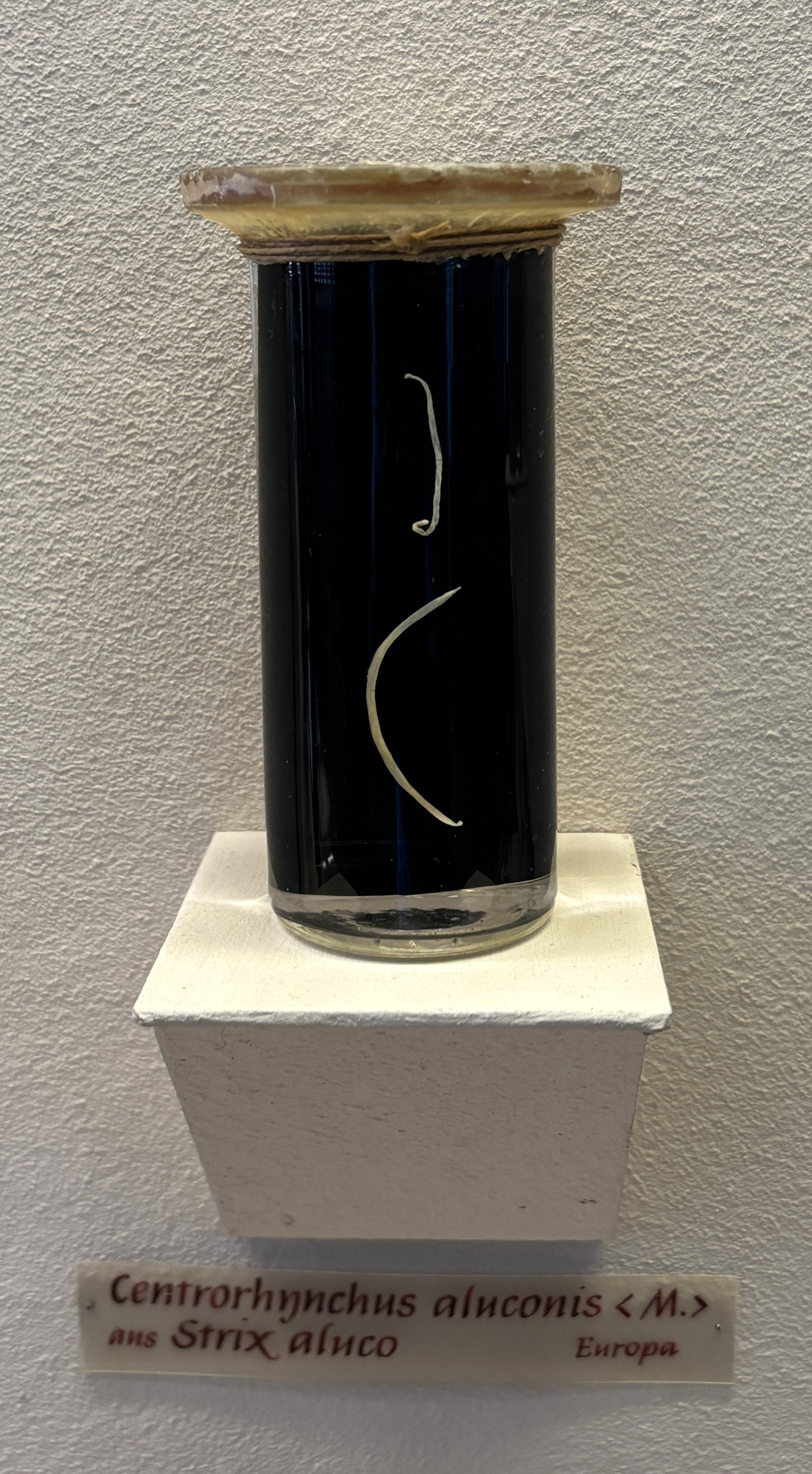
Centrorhynchus aluconis

- Centrorhynchus acanthotrias (von Linstow, 1883)
- Centrorhynchus albensis Rengaraju and Das, 1975
- Centrorhynchus albidus Meyer, 1932
- Centrorhynchus aluconis (Mueller, 1780)

The complete mitochondrial genome of C. aluconis has been sequenced.

- Centrorhynchus amini Khan, Muti-ur-Rahman, Bilqees and Khatoon, 2010
- Centrorhynchus amphibius Das, 1950
- Centrorhynchus appendiculatus (Westrumb, 1821)
- Centrorhynchus asturinus (Johnston, 1912)
- Centrorhynchus atheni Gupta and Fatma, 1983
- Centrorhynchus bancrofti (Johnston and Best, 1943)
- Centrorhynchus bazaleticus Kuraschvili, 1955
- Centrorhynchus bengalensis Datta and Soota, 1954
- Centrorhynchus bethaniae George and Nadakal, 1987
- Centrorhynchus bilqeesae Ghazi, Khan and Noorun-Nisa, 2005
- Centrorhynchus brama Rengaraju and Das, 1980
- Centrorhynchus brevicaudatus Das, 1949
- Centrorhynchus brumpti Golvan, 1965
- Centrorhynchus brygooi Golvan, 1965
- Centrorhynchus bubonis Yamaguti, 1939
- Centrorhynchus buckleyi Gupta and Fatma, 1983
- Centrorhynchus buteonis (Schrank, 1788)
- Centrorhynchus californicus Millzner, 1924
- Centrorhynchus chabaudi Golvan, 1958
- Centrorhynchus clitorideus (Meyer, 1931)
- Centrorhynchus conspectus Van Cleave and Pratt, 1940
- Centrorhynchus crotophagicola Schmidt and Neiland, 1966
- Centrorhynchus dimorphocephalus (Westrumb, 1821)
- Centrorhynchus dipsadis (Linstow, 1888)
- Centrorhynchus elongatus Yamaguti, 1935
- Centrorhynchus falconis (Johnston and Best, 1943)
- Centrorhynchus fasciatus (Westrumb, 1821)
- Centrorhynchus fisheri Bhattacharya, 1999
- Centrorhynchus freundi (Hartwick, 1953)
- Centrorhynchus fukiensis Wang, 1966
- Centrorhynchus galliardi Golvan, 1956
- Centrorhynchus gendrei (Golvan, 1957)
- Centrorhynchus gibsoni Khan, Ghazi and Bilqees, 2002
- Centrorhynchus giganteus Travassos, 1921
- Centrorhynchus glaucidii Wang, 1966
- Centrorhynchus globirostris Amin, Heckmann, Wilson, Keele, and Khan, 2014

C. globirostris infests the pheasant crow (Centropus sinensis) in Pakistan. A genetic analysis has been completed.

- Centrorhynchus globocaudatus (Zeder, 1800)
- Centrorhynchus golvani Anantaraman, et al., 1969
- Centrorhynchus grassei Golvan, 1965
- Centrorhynchus guira Lunaschi and Drago, 2010
- Centrorhynchus guptai Golvan, 1969
- Centrorhynchus hagiangensis (Petrochenko and Fan, 1969)
- Centrorhynchus halcyonicola Smales, 2011
- Centrorhynchus hartwichi Golvan, 1994
- Centrorhynchus horridus (Linstow, 1897)
- Centrorhynchus indicus Golvan, 1956
- Centrorhynchus insularis Tubangui, 1833
- Centrorhynchus itatsinsis Fukui, 1929
- Centrorhynchus javanicans Rengaraju and Das, 1975
- Centrorhynchus knowlesi Datta and Soota, 1955
- Centrorhynchus kuntzi Schmidt and Neiland, 1966
- Centrorhynchus latai Golvan, 1994
- Centrorhynchus leptorhynchus Meyer, 1932
- Centrorhynchus longicephalus Das, 1950
- Centrorhynchus lucknowensis Gupta and Fatma, 1983
- Centrorhynchus mabuiae (Linstow, 1908)
- Centrorhynchus macrorchis Das, 1949
- Centrorhynchus madagascariensis (Golvan, 1957)
- Centrorhynchus magnus Fukui, 1929
- Centrorhynchus mariauxi Smales, 2011
- Centrorhynchus merulae Dolfus and Golvan, 1961
- Centrorhynchus microcephalus (Bravo-hollis, 1947)
- Centrorhynchus migrans Zuberi and Faroog, 1974
- Centrorhynchus milvus Ward, 1956
- Centrorhynchus mysentri Gupta and Fatma, 1983
- Centrorhynchus nahuelhuapensis Steinauer, Flores and Rauque, 2020

C. nahuelhuapensis was found in the intestine of the rufous-legged owl (Strix rufipes) in Patagonia, Argentina. The proboscis is armed with 31–33 rows of hooks 16 or 17 hooks per row. The hooks in each row are distributed into 5 true hooks, 4 transitional hooks, and 7–8 spiniform hooks. It has three cement glands. The worm has a filiform body. Phylogenetic analysis was conducted using the small and large ribosomal subunits confirming the placement of this species in the genus Centrorhynchus.

- Centrorhynchus narcissae Florescu, 1942
- Centrorhynchus nicaraguensis Schmidt and Neiland, 1966
- Centrorhynchus nickoli Khan, Bilqees and Ghazi, 2001
- Centrorhynchus ninni (Stossich, 1891)
- Centrorhynchus owli Bhattacharya, 1999
- Centrorhynchus paramaryasis Amin, 2013
- Centrorhynchus petrochenkoi Kuraschvilli, 1955
- Centrorhynchus polemaeti Troncy, 1970
- Centrorhynchus ptyasus Gupta, 1950
- Centrorhynchus pycnonoti Wang, 1986
- Centrorhynchus renardi (Lindemann, 1865)
- Centrorhynchus robustus Richardson and Nickol, 1995
- Centrorhynchus sharmai Gupta and Lata, 1966
- Centrorhynchus sholapurensis Rengaraju and Das, 1975
- Centrorhynchus sikkimensis Bhattacharya, 2003
- Centrorhynchus simplex Meyer, 1932
- Centrorhynchus sindhensis Khan, Khatoon and Bilqees, 2002
- Centrorhynchus sinicus Wang, 1966
- Centrorhynchus smyrnensis Bhattacharya, 2007
- Centrorhynchus spilornae Schmidt and Kuntz, 1969
- Centrorhynchus spinosus (Kaiser, 1893)
- Centrorhynchus tumidulus (Rudolphi, 1819)
- Centrorhynchus tyotensis Rengaraju and Das, 1975
- Centrorhynchus undulatus Dollfus, 1951
