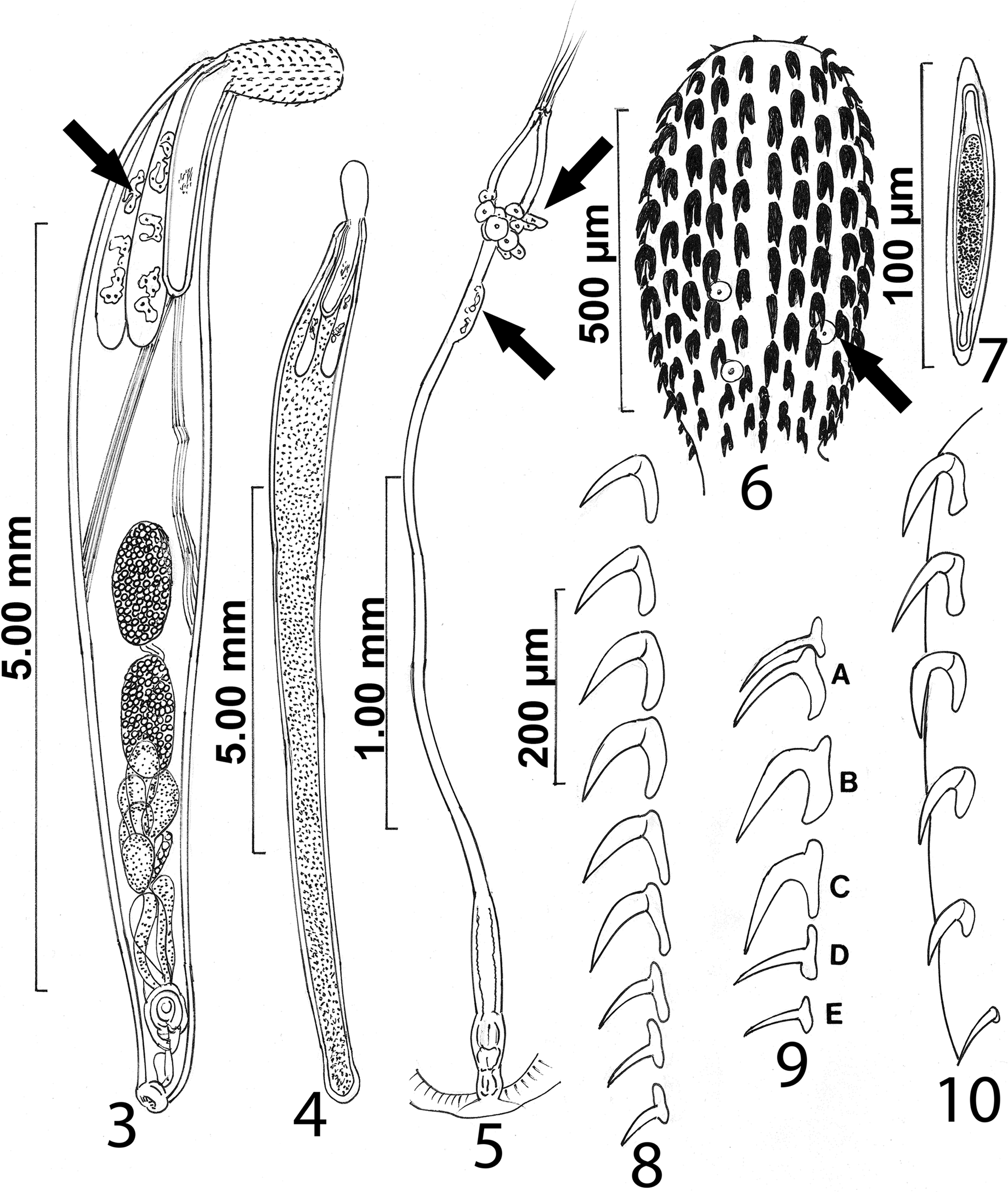
- Echinorhynchus baeri

Scientific classification
- Kingdom: Animalia
- Phylum: Acanthocephala
- Class: Palaeacanthocephala
- Order: Echinorhynchida
- Family: Echinorhynchidae
- Genus: Echinorhynchus; Zoega in Müller, 1776

Species
- See text

Synonyms
- Metechinorhynchus Petrochenko, 1956

= Echinorhynchus =

Genus of thorny-headed worms

Echinorhynchus, from Ancient Greek ἐχῖνος (ekhînos), meaning "hedgehog", and ῥύγχος (rhúnkhos), meaning "snout", is a genus of acanthocephalan parasitic worms. They parasitize a wide variety of fishes from both marine and fresh waters. The intermediate host is usually a crustacean.

- Echinorhynchus abyssicola Dollfus, 1931
- Echinorhynchus acanthotrias Linstow, 1883
- Echinorhynchus alcedinis Westrumb, 1821
- Echinorhynchus armoricanus Golvan, 1969
- Echinorhynchus astacifluviatilis Diesing, 1851
- Echinorhynchus attenuatus Linton, 1891
- Echinorhynchus baeri Kostylev, 1928
- Echinorhynchus bipennis Kaiser, 1893
- Echinorhynchus blenni Rudolphi, 1810
- Echinorhynchus briconi Machado, 1959
- Echinorhynchus calloti Golvan, 1969
- Echinorhynchus canyonensis Huffman and Kleiver, 1977
- Echinorhynchus cestodicola Linstow, 1905
- Echinorhynchus chierchiae Monticelli, 1889
- Echinorhynchus cinctulus Porta, 1905
- Echinorhynchus corrugatus Sars, 1885
- Echinorhynchus cotti Yamaguti, 1939
- Echinorhynchus cryophilus (Sokolowskaja, 1962)
- Echinorhynchus debenhami Leiper and Atkinson, 1914
- Echinorhynchus dendrocopi Westrumb, 1821
- Echinorhynchus diffuens Zenker, 1832
- Echinorhynchus dissimilis Yamaguti, 1939
- Echinorhynchus eperlani Linstow, 1884
- Echinorhynchus gadi Zoega, 1776
- Echinorhynchus galbulae Diesing, 1851
- Echinorhynchus garzae Zeder, 1803
- Echinorhynchus gazae Gmelin, 1790
- Echinorhynchus gomesi Machado, 1948
- Echinorhynchus gracilis Machado, 1948
- Echinorhynchus gymnocyprii Wang and Yang, 1981
- Echinorhynchus hexacanthus Dujardin, 1845
- Echinorhynchus hexagrammi Beava, 1965
- Echinorhynchus inflexus Cobbold, 1861
- Echinorhynchus jucundus Travassos, 1923
- Echinorhynchus kushiroensis Fujita, 1921
- Echinorhynchus labri Rudolphi, 1819
- Echinorhynchus lageniformis Ekbaum, 1838
- Echinorhynchus lateralis Leidy, 1851
- Echinorhynchus laurentianus Roland, 1957
- Echinorhynchus leidyi Van Cleave, 1924
- Echinorhynchus lendix (Phipps, 1774)
- Echinorhynchus lenoki Achmerov, et al., 1941
- Echinorhynchus lotellae Yamaguti, 1939
- Echinorhynchus melanoglaeae Dollfus, 1960
- Echinorhynchus monticelli Porta, 1904
- Echinorhynchus nardoi Molin, 1859
- Echinorhynchus nitzschi Giebel, 1866
- Echinorhynchus oblitus Golvan, 1969
- Echinorhynchus orestiae Neveu-Lemaire, 1905
- Echinorhynchus orientalis Kaw, 1951
- Echinorhynchus paranensis Machado, 1959
- Echinorhynchus parasiluri Fukui, 1929
- Echinorhynchus pardi Huxley, 1902
- Echinorhynchus pari Rudolphi, 1819
- Echinorhynchus peleci Grimm, 1870
- Echinorhynchus platessae Rudolphi, 1809
- Echinorhynchus platessoides Gmelin, 1790
- Echinorhynchus pleuronectis Gmelin, 1790
- Echinorhynchus pleuronectisplatessoides Viborg, 1795
- Echinorhynchus praetextus Molin, 1858
- Echinorhynchus pupa Linstow, 1905
- Echinorhynchus rhenanus (Golvan, 1969)
- Echinorhynchus rhytidodes Monticelli, 1905
- Echinorhynchus robustus Datta, 1928
- Echinorhynchus salmonis Mueller, 1784
- Echinorhynchus salobrensis Machado, 1948
- Echinorhynchus sciaenae Rudolphi, 1819
- Echinorhynchus scopis Gmelin, 1790
- Echinorhynchus scorpaenae Rudolphi, 1819
- Echinorhynchus serpentulus Grimm, 1870
- Echinorhynchus sipunculus Schrank, 1788
- Echinorhynchus solitarium Molin, 1858
- Echinorhynchus stridulae Goeze, 1782
- Echinorhynchus strigis Gmelin, 1782
- Echinorhynchus taeniaeforme Linstow, 1890
- Echinorhynchus tardae Rudolphi, 1809
- Echinorhynchus tenuicollis Froelich, 1802
- Echinorhynchus truttae Schrank, 1788
- Echinorhynchus urniger Dujardin, 1845
- Echinorhynchus yamagutii Golvan, 1969
- Echinorhynchus zanclorhynchi Johnston and Best, 1937

== Gallery ==
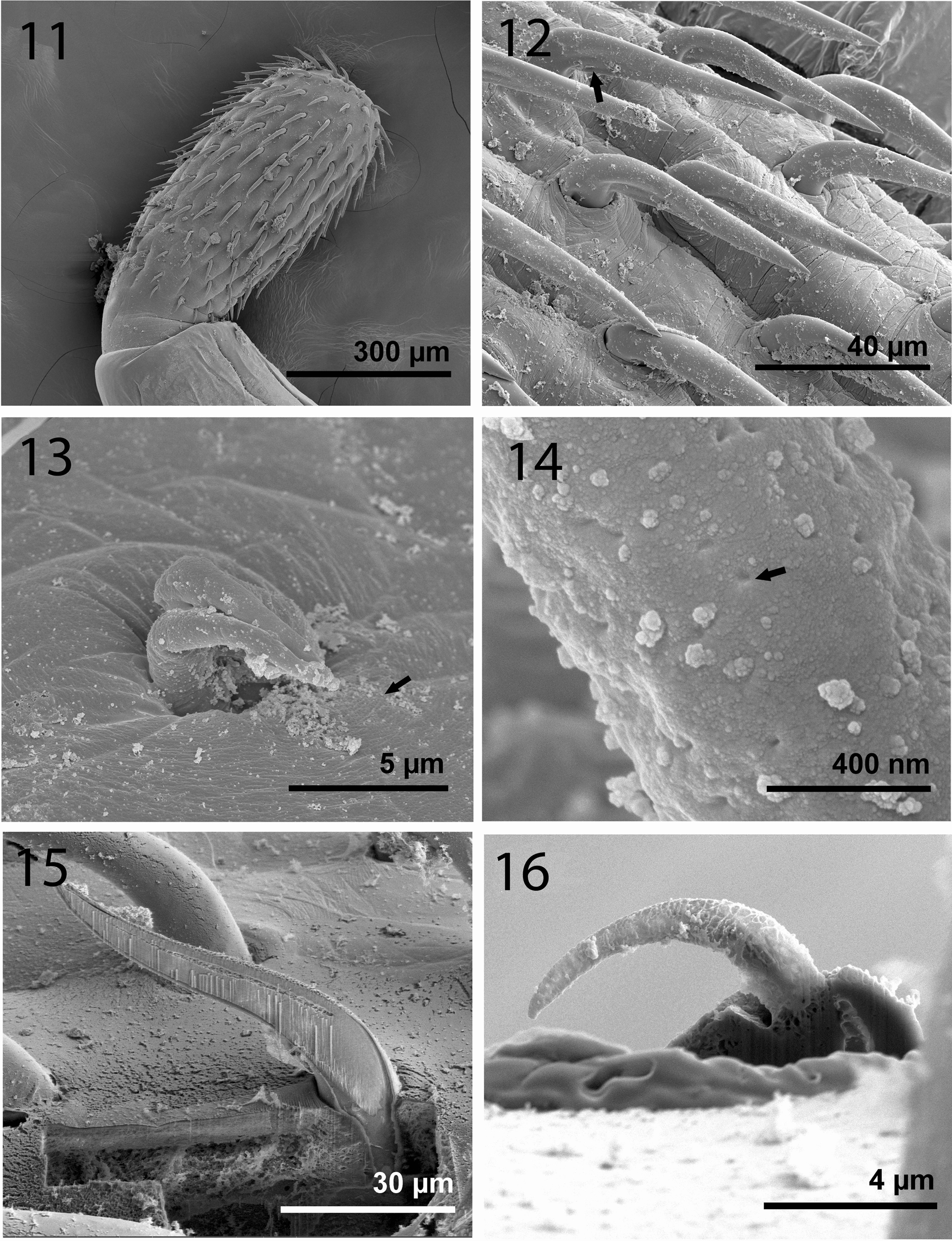
SEM of mature specimens of Echinorhynchus baeri

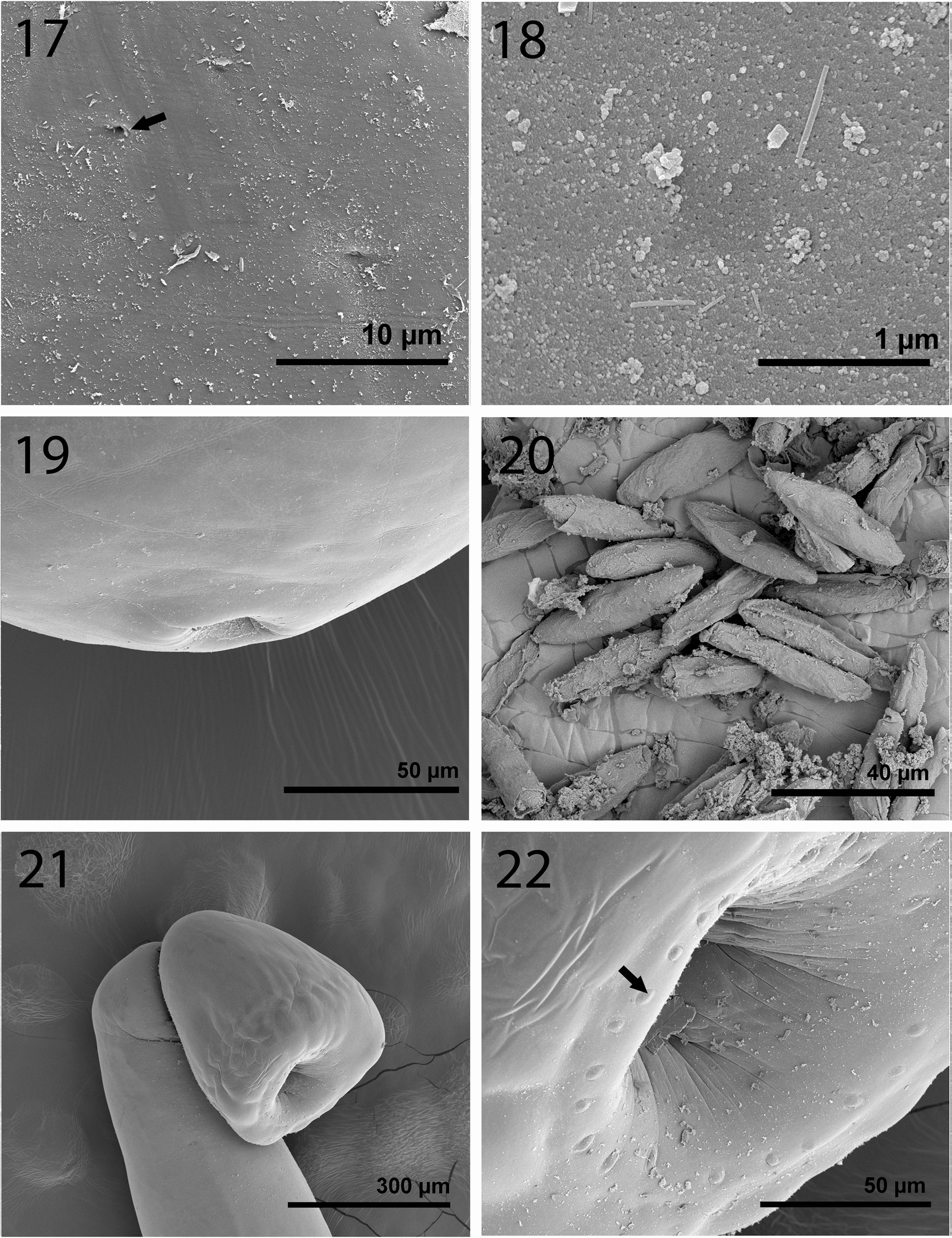
SEM of mature specimens of Echinorhynchus baeri
