= Acanthocephalus dirus =

Scientific classification
- Kingdom: Animalia
- Phylum: Acanthocephala
- Class: Palaeacanthocephala
- Order: Echinorhynchida
- Family: Echinorhynchidae
- Genus: Acanthocephalus
- Species: A. dirus

Binomial name
- Acanthocephalus dirus (Van Cleve, 1931)

Synonyms
- Acanthocephalus jacksoni (Bullock, 1962); Acanthocephalus parksidei (Amin, 1975); Echinorhynchus dirus (Van Cleve, 1931)

Species of thorny-headed worm

Acanthocephalus dirus is a species of parasitic worm in the Echinorhynchidae family. Instead of having its eggs expelled from the host in feces, the gravid female detaches itself from the host's digestive tract and sinks to the bottom, where her body is consumed by the species' intermediate host, Caecidotea intermedius, a species of isopod. Upon hatching, the larvae begin to alter their host's behavior. This will manifest in lighter pigmentation and an increased attraction to predators, such as A. dirus' primary hosts.

== Hosts ==
Acanthocephalus dirus is commonly found parasitizing the following species of fish:

- Alewife (Alosa pseudoharengus)
- Longnose Sucker (Catostomus catostomus)
- White Sucker (Catostomus commersonii)
- Lake whitefish (Coregonus clupeaformis)
- Mottled sculpin (Cottus bairdii)
- Slimy sculpin (Cottus cognatus)
- Spoonhead sculpin (Cottus ricei)
- Brook stickleback (Culaea inconstans)
- Northern pike (Esox lucius)
- Burbot (Lota lota)
- White bass (Morone chrysops)
- Coho salmon (Oncorhynchus kisutch)
- Rainbow trout (Oncorhynchus mykiss)
- Sockeye salmon (Oncorhynchus nerka)
- Rainbow smelt (Osmerus mordax)
- Yellow perch (Perca flavescens)
- Trout-perch (Percopsis omiscomaycus)
- Round whitefish (Prosopium cylindraceum)
- Ninespine stickleback (Pungitius pungitius)
- Brown trout (Salmo trutta)
- Brook trout (Salvelinus fontinalis)
- Lake trout (Salvelinus namaycush)
