= Sphaerirostris =

Scientific classification
- Kingdom: Animalia
- Phylum: Acanthocephala
- Class: Palaeacanthocephala
- Order: Polymorphida
- Family: Centrorhynchidae
- Genus: Sphaerirostris; Golvan, 1956

Genus of worms

Sphaerirostris is a genus of parasitic worms belonging to the family Centrorhynchidae.

The species of this genus are found in Europe, Russia and Northern America.

Species:

- Sphaerirostris areolatus (Rudolphi, 1819)
- Sphaerirostris batrachus (Das, 1952)
- Sphaerirostris bipartitus (Soloviev, 1912)
