= Acanthocephalus anguillae =

Scientific classification
- Kingdom: Animalia
- Phylum: Acanthocephala
- Class: Palaeacanthocephala
- Order: Echinorhynchida
- Family: Echinorhynchidae
- Genus: Acanthocephalus
- Species: A. anguillae

Binomial name
- Acanthocephalus anguillae (Müller, 1780)

Species of thorny-headed worm

Acanthocephalus anguillae is a species of parasitic worm in the phylum Acanthocephala. An intestinal parasite, it is found both in the Baltic Sea and along the coast of California, where it is often found in the fore- and mid-gut of the brown and rainbow trouts.
