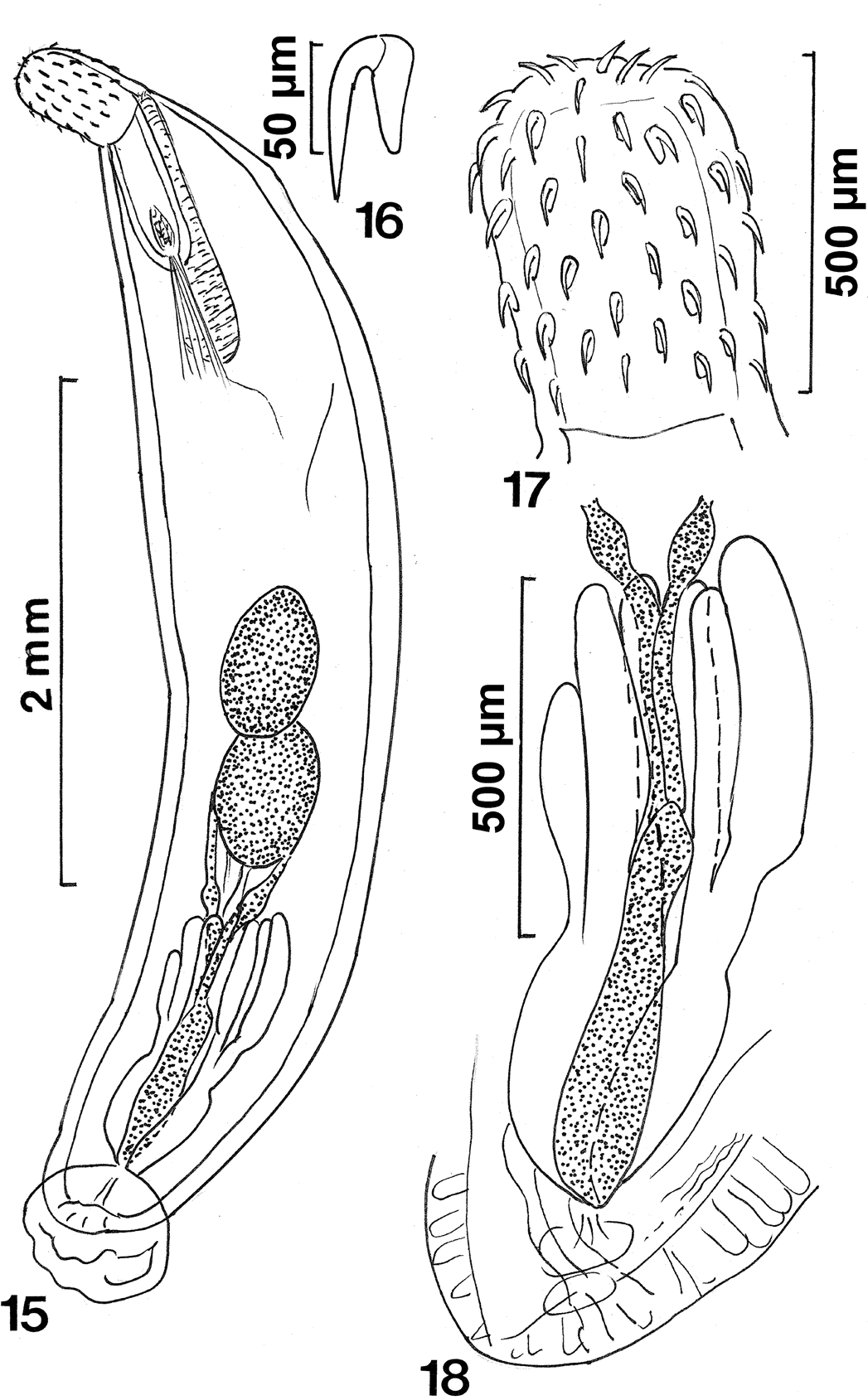
- Acanthocephalus parallelcementglandatus from Clarias batrachus. 15) Holotype male. Note the piercing of the incomplete outer proboscis receptacle posteriorly with retractor muscles. 16) A typical hook near the middle of the proboscis 17. Proboscis 18) Posterior part of the reproductive system showing detail of the parallel cement glands, common cement ducts, and sperm duct system (dotted).

Scientific classification
- Kingdom: Animalia
- Phylum: Acanthocephala
- Class: Palaeacanthocephala
- Order: Echinorhynchida
- Family: Echinorhynchidae
- Genus: Acanthocephalus; Koelreuter, 1771

Species
- See text

= Acanthocephalus (acanthocephalan) =

Genus of thorny-headed worms

Acanthocephalus (meaning "spine head") is a genus of parasitic worms. One of the species in this genus is Acanthocephalus anguillae (Mueller, 1780), a fish parasite. Acanthocephalans are also found in humans and primates, causing a common zoonotic infection called "human acanthocephaliasis". While pathogens can be transferred among animals and humans, the main source of human acanthocephaliasis is the diet of infected raw fish and insects (Lotfy, 2020). Because they are lacking circulatory, respiratory, and digestive systems, Acanthocephalus are exceptionally well-adapted to a symbiotrophic existence (Margulis & Chapman, 2009).

== Life cycle ==
There are five steps in which Acanthocephala cycles through life; (1)Their eggs shed in feces. (2)These eggs are then ingested by their host. (3)The definitive host then gets infected due to ingesting the eggs from the first host. (4)The definitive host is either rats or raccoons and therefore, in this step the Acanthocephala matures in the small intestine. (5)Lastly, the Acanthocephala matures and also produces eggs inside the definitive host (Centers for Disease Control and Prevention, 2019).

== Species ==
Contains the following species:

- Acanthocephalus acutispinus Machado, 1891
- Acanthocephalus acutulus Van Cleave, 1931
- Acanthocephalus alabamensis Amin and Williams, 1983
- Acanthocephalus anguillae (Mueller, 1780)

An intestinal parasite, it is found both in the Baltic Sea and along the coast of California, where it is often found in the fore- and mid-gut of the brown and rainbow trouts.

- Acanthocephalus anthuris (Dujardin, 1845)
- Acanthocephalus balkanicus Batchvoarov, 1974
- Acanthocephalus breviprostatus Kennedy, 1982
- Acanthocephalus bufonis Burton & Pichelin, 1999
- Acanthocephalus clavula (Dujardin, 1845)
- Acanthocephalus correalimai Machado, 1970
- Acanthocephalus criniae Anow, 1971
- Acanthocephalus curtus (Achenrov, et al., 1941)
- Acanthocephalus dirus (Van Cleave, 1931)

Instead of having its eggs expelled from the host in feces, the gravid female detaches itself from the host's digestive tract and sinks to the bottom, where her body is consumed by the species' intermediate host, Caecidotea intermedius, a species of isopod. Upon hatching, the larvae begin to alter their host's behavior. This will manifest in lighter pigmentation and an increased attraction to predators, such as A. dirus' primary hosts.

- Acanthocephalus domerguei (Golvan, et al., 1972
- Acanthocephalus echigoensis Fujita, 1920

Found both in California and in Thailand, it has been known to parasitize the sockeye salmon, chum salmon, rainbow trout, and barramundi.

- Acanthocephalus elongatus Van Cleave, 1937
- Acanthocephalus falcatus (Froelich, 1789)
- Acanthocephalus fluviatilis Paperna, 1964
- Acanthocephalus galaxii Hine, 1977
- Acanthocephalus goaensis Jain and Gupta, 1981
- Acanthocephalus gotoi Van Cleave, 1925
- Acanthocephalus graciliacanthus Meyer, 1932
- Acanthocephalus haranti Golvan and Oliver, 1969
- Acanthocephalus hastae Bayliss, 1944
- Acanthocephalus japonicus (Fukui and Morisita, 1936)
- Acanthocephalus kaskmirensis Datta, 1936
- Acanthocephalus kubulensis Datta and Soota, 1956
- Acanthocephalus lucidus Van Cleave, 1925
- Acanthocephalus lucii (Müller, 1776)

It is native to Europe.

- Acanthocephalus lutzi (Linstow, 1896)
- Acanthocephalus madagascariensis Golvan, 1965
- Acanthocephalus minor Yamaguti, 1935
- Acanthocephalus nanus Van Cleave, 1925
- Acanthocephalus opsariichthydis
- Acanthocephalus parallelcementglandatus Amin, Heckmann & Ha, 2014
- Acanthocephalus parallelotestis Achmerov, et al., 1941
- Acanthocephalus paronai (Condorelli, 1897)
- Acanthocephalus pesteri Tadros, 1966
- Acanthocephalus ranae (Schrank, 1788)
- Acanthocephalus rauschi (Schmidt, 1969)
- Acanthocephalus reunionensis Smales, Sasal & Taraschewski, 2007
- Acanthocephalus sameguiensis
- Acanthocephalus serendibensis Crusz and Mills, 1970
- Acanthocephalus srilankensis Crusz and Ching, 1976
- Acanthocephalus tahleguahensis Oetinger and Buckner, 1976
- Acanthocephalus tenuirostris (Achmerov, et al., 1941)
- Acanthocephalus tigrinae (Shipley, 1903)
- Acanthocephalus tumescens (Linstow, 1896)
