= Pseudoacanthocephalus xenopeltidis =

Scientific classification
- Kingdom: Animalia
- Phylum: Acanthocephala
- Class: Palaeacanthocephala
- Order: Echinorhynchida
- Family: Echinorhynchidae
- Genus: Pseudoacanthocephalus
- Species: P. xenopeltidis

Binomial name
- Pseudoacanthocephalus xenopeltidis Shipley (1903)

Species of worm

Pseudoacanthocephalus xenopeltidis is a species of parasitic worm in the genus Pseudoacanthocephalus.
