= Pseudoacanthocephalus goodmani =

Scientific classification
- Kingdom: Animalia
- Phylum: Acanthocephala
- Class: Palaeacanthocephala
- Order: Echinorhynchida
- Family: Echinorhynchidae
- Genus: Pseudoacanthocephalus
- Species: P. goodmani

Binomial name
- Pseudoacanthocephalus goodmani Smales, Allain, Wilkinson & Harris, 2020

Species of acantocephalan

Pseudoacanthocephalus goodmani is a species of parasitic worm in the phylum Acanthocephala, first described in 2020.

The species is an intestinal parasite of the guttural toad (Sclerophyrs gutturalis) but has so far only been found in a single individual that originated from Mauritius, where the toads have been introduced. Pseudoacanthocephalus goodmani may have a wider host range that extends into other amphibian species in South Africa which is the source of the toads introduced into Mauritius, further surveys are needed to confirm this.

This newly described species of parasite was collected from the faecal pellets of a guttural toad that was a stowaway from Mauritius where it entered Cambridge. The worms were found after the most unusual set of events with the toad surviving a cycle in a washing machine before being discovered by the family that had unwittingly brought it back with them.

Pseudoacanthocephalus goodmani gets its name from the British herpetologist Mark J. Goodman as a dedication to his commitment to amphibian conservation.
