= Acanthocephalus echigoensis =

Scientific classification
- Kingdom: Animalia
- Phylum: Acanthocephala
- Class: Palaeacanthocephala
- Order: Echinorhynchida
- Family: Echinorhynchidae
- Genus: Acanthocephalus
- Species: A. echigoensis

Binomial name
- Acanthocephalus echigoensis (Fujita, 1920)

Synonyms
- Acanthocephalus oncorhynchi (Fujita, 1921); Acanthocephalus aculeatus (Van Cleave, 1931); Acanthocephalus acerbus (Van Cleave, 1931)

Species of thorny-headed worm

Acanthocephalus echigoensis is a species of parasitic worm in the phylum Acanthocephala. Found both in California and in Thailand, it has been known to parasitize the sockeye salmon, chum salmon, rainbow trout, and barramundi.
