= Philadelphia Herpetological Society =

- PHS logo
- Formation: 1952
- Purpose: Education about and conservation of reptiles
- Headquarters: Philadelphia, Pennsylvania
- Region served: Southeastern Pennsylvania and South Jersey
- President: Mark F. Miller
- Website: http://www.herpetology.com/phs.html

The Philadelphia Herpetological Society (PHS) is the oldest, continually operated reptile group in North America. It was founded by Roger Conant (herpetologist) and a group of like-minded herpetologists in 1952. PHS is a US 501(c)3 non-profit educational organization. The current president is Mark Miller.

PHS has published the Bulletin and occasional newsletters throughout its history.

They seem to meet infrequently at present but operate a reptile rescue in the Philadelphia metro area, and own and operate a wildlife conservation area in Burlington, New Jersey.
