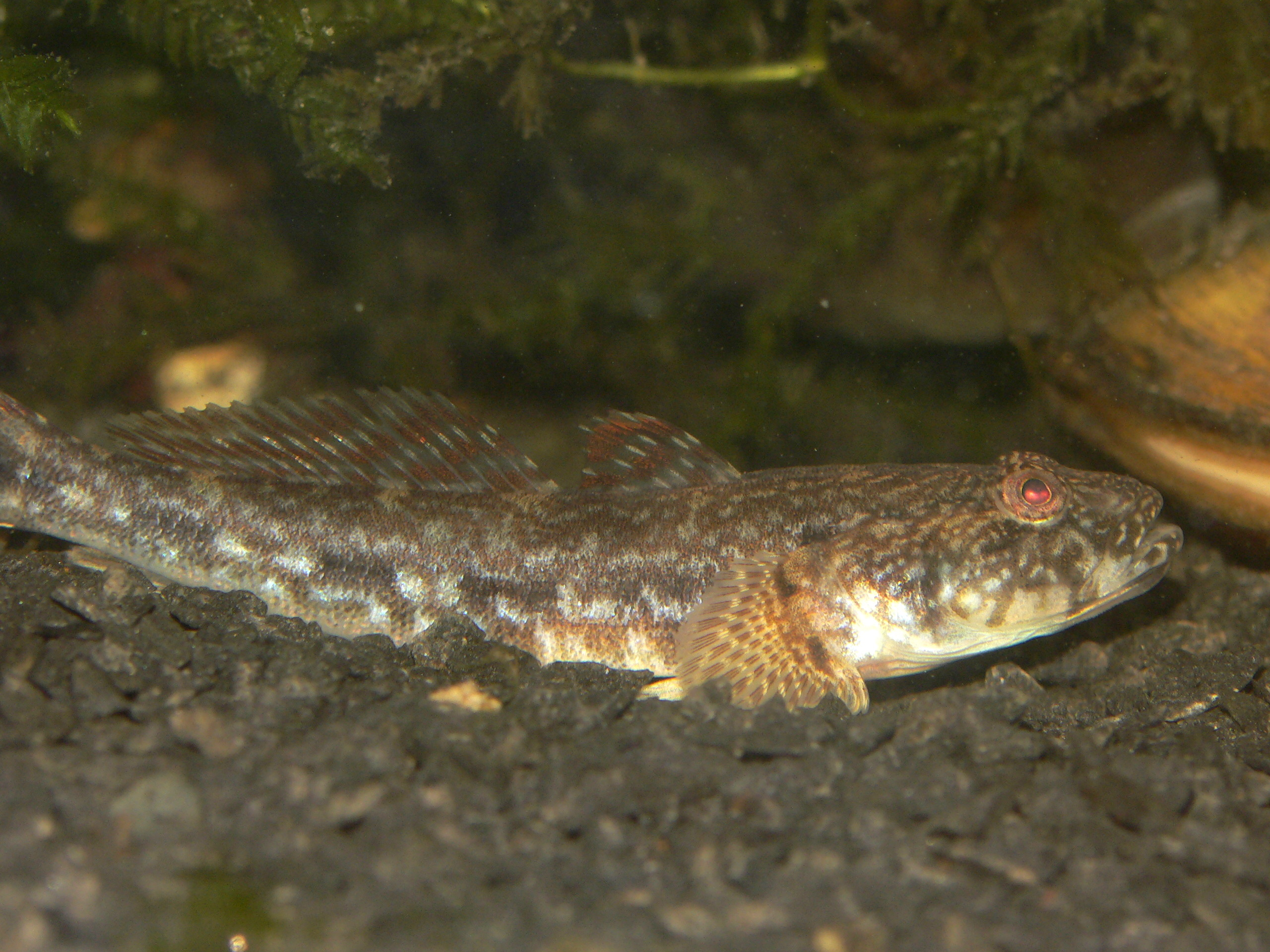

Conservation status
- Least Concern (IUCN 3.1)

Scientific classification
- Kingdom: Animalia
- Phylum: Chordata
- Class: Actinopterygii
- Order: Gobiiformes
- Family: Gobiidae
- Genus: Ponticola
- Species: P. kessleri

Binomial name
- Ponticola kessleri (Günther, 1861)
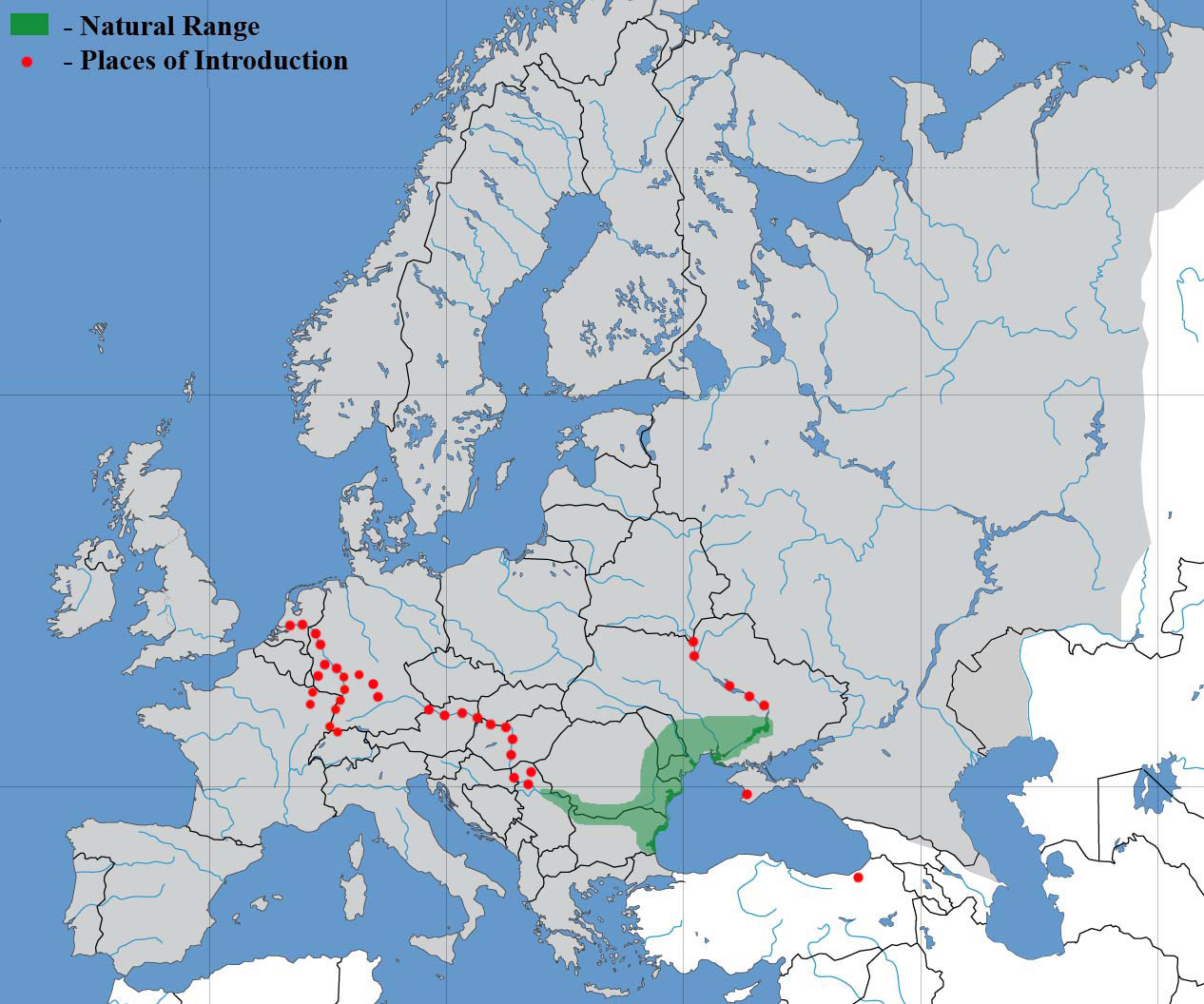
- The range of the bighead goby

Synonyms
- Gobius kessleri Günther, 1861; Neogobius kessleri (Günther, 1861); Gobius platycephalus Kessler, 1857 (ambiguous name)

= Ponticola kessleri =

Species of fish

Ponticola kessleri, the bighead goby or Kessler's goby, is a species of goby native to Eurasia. The bighead goby is a Ponto-Caspian relict species. It inhabits the fresh and oligohaline waters, with mineralisation from 0–0.5‰ up to 1.5–3.0‰.

== Characteristics ==
This species has a big flattened head, strongly expended upper lip, prolonged-conical body and thickened anterior. The mandibula is longer than maxilla. It reaches 22 centimeters (8.7 in). A triangular dark spot is visible near the caudal fin. The collar of its abdominal sucker has blades. The sucker does not reach the anus. It is red- or grey-brown with 5 transverse lines on the back, one of which is on the basis of the caudal fin. The head has light round spots with a white margin on sides. The basis of the pectoral fin has wave-shaped brown spots, odd fins have lines of black spots.

This species is distinguished from related Black Sea basin inhabitants by the following: 75–95% of its length is between its origin and anus; ctenoid scales completely cover the predorsal area and nape; pelvic disc fraenum with angular lobes, Distinguishing characteristics include a frenum with length 1/6-1/2 of its width at base, midlateral series scales 68-72 +3-4, a snout length 1.5-2.0 times its eye diameter, that its first branched ray of second dorsal is about as long as penultimate ray and that the posterior part of first dorsal is without a black spot.

== Ecology ==
=== Range ===
It is present in lagoons and estuaries of the north-western Black Sea, near the Bulgarian coast, especially in lakes Mandra, Vaya, Varna, Beloslavsko. In the Danube River the original distribution of the bighead goby reached Vidin and was common in the lakes of the Danube Delta. It inhabits the rivers Dniester up to Kamianets-Podilskyi, small rivers Zbruch and Bystrytsia. Dnieper up to Dnipropetrovsk, also in the Southern Bug River.

The bighead goby was recorded as non-indigenous species in the Slovak section of the Danube River in 1996, and until 2004, this species had the widest density and distribution among the four Gobiidae species. In the Danube River basin, species is also mentioned as non-indigenous in the Tisza River. In the Upper Danube it was registered in Austrian and German parts up to the City of Straubing. During 2000–2002 рр. this species was registered in small streams of the Black Sea coast of Eastern Turkey Since March 2009 the fish is registered in the North Sea basin, in the Waal River, the Netherlands. At the German part of the Lower Rhine, between the cities of Cologne and Rees, this species consists of 52% of gobies catchments in 2009. In 2011, the range of this species comprised the Rhine River in Germany, France, and Switzerland, also in the French part of the Moselle River.

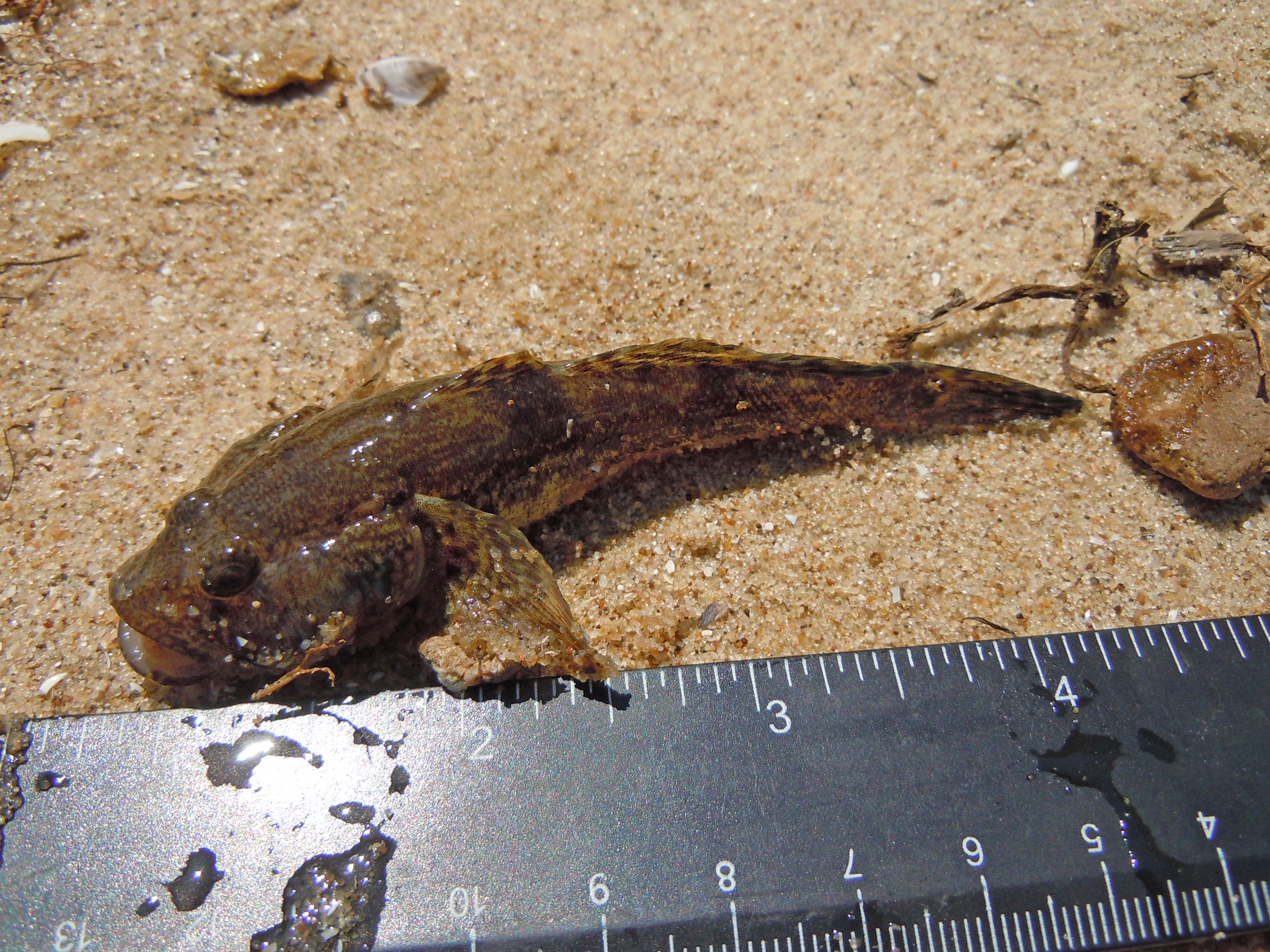
Young Bighead goby from the Dniester Estuary, Ukraine

=== Feeding ===
In the Dniester Estuary the bighead mostly eats fish—up to 92% by weight. The crustaceans (Corophium chelicorne, Paramysis intermedia) also provides up to 7% of its diet. Molluscs and polychaetes have less importance (2% each).

=== Predators and parasites ===
The bighead plays an important role in the diet of predatory fish, such as zander.

In the Dniester Estuary the bighead goby hosts parasites such as trematodes Nicolla skrjabini and larvae of nematodes Eustrongylides excisus. In the Middle Danube this goby species supports 33 species of parasites. The core of the parasitefauna are acanthocephalans Pomphorhynchus laevis, glochidia of molluscs Anadonta anatina, and nematodes Raphidascaris acus. The bighead goby host the larvae of invasive Far Eastern nematode Anguillicoloides crassus.

In the Austrian sector of the Danube, 5 parasite species are registered: infusoria Trichodina sp., parasitic crustaceans Ergasilus sieboldi, trematodes Diplostomum sp. and N. skrjabini, and also acanthocephalans Acanthocephalus lucii.
