= Society for the Study of Amphibians and Reptiles =

Nonprofit organization in United States

- Website: http://www.ssarherps.org

History
- Founded: 1958
- Founders: Kraig Adler; David Dennis

Current Executive
- President: Richard Shine
- President-Elect: Marty Crump
- Immediate Past-President: Aaron Bauer
- Treasurer: Ann V. Paterson
- Secretary: Marion R. Preest

The Society for the Study of Amphibians and Reptiles (SSAR) is an international herpetological society. It is a non-profit organization supporting education, conservation, and research related to reptiles and amphibians. Regular publications include the Journal of Herpetology and Herpetological Review. It is the largest international herpetological society, and is recognized worldwide for having the most diverse program of publications, meetings, and other activities.

The SSAR Conservation Committee brings conservation issues that affect reptiles and amphibians to the attention of state and federal government agencies, non-government organizations, and herpetologists worldwide. The committee serves as a liaison between the SSAR and public and private groups to provide expert advice, factual knowledge, and educational information about problems confronting amphibians and reptiles, including habitat protection, endangered, threatened, and special concern species, commercial and private use, contaminants, and priorities for conservation-oriented research. The committee coordinates SSAR responses to proposed national and international legislation and other conservation matters involving reptiles and amphibians. Official responses are submitted for approval by the President and Secretary before public release. Chair submits annual report to Secretary prior to the annual meeting of the Board. The SSAR also supports numerous grants programs, international exchanges and international cooperative efforts for study and publications.

== History ==
The society was founded as a regional organization, The Ohio Herpetological Society (OHS), by two young but serious-minded amateurs, Kraig Adler and David M. Dennis, then 16 and 17 years of age respectively. They decided in the fall of 1957 to formalize interactions amongst a small group of amateur herpetologists throughout Ohio and began publishing a combined journal and newsletter (called the Trimonthly Report) in January 1958. The name of the society was changed to The Society for the Study of Amphibians and Reptiles on January 1, 1967.

== Publications ==
The SSAR publishes a number of books and series including:

- Catalogue of American Amphibians and Reptiles
- Contributions to Herpetology
- Facsimile Reprints in Herpetology
- Herpetological Circulars
- Herpetological Conservation
- Herpetological Review
- Journal of Herpetology

== Endowments ==
The SSAR has established several endowments including the Bobby Witcher Society. The society was co-founded by Dean E. (Doc) Metter, a member of the biology faculty at the University of Missouri. The society now funds the SSAR's Dean E. Metter Memorial Award for outstanding herpetology students seeking further education for a career in vertebrate biology.
