= Centrorhynchus =

Centrorhynchus may refer to:

- Centrorhynchus (worm), a genus of parasitic worms in the family Centrorhynchidae
- Centrorhynchus, a fossil genus of brachiopods in the family Trigonirhynchiidae, synonym of Sartenaerus
- Centrorhynchus, a genus of weevils in the family Curculionidae, synonym of Ceutorhynchus
