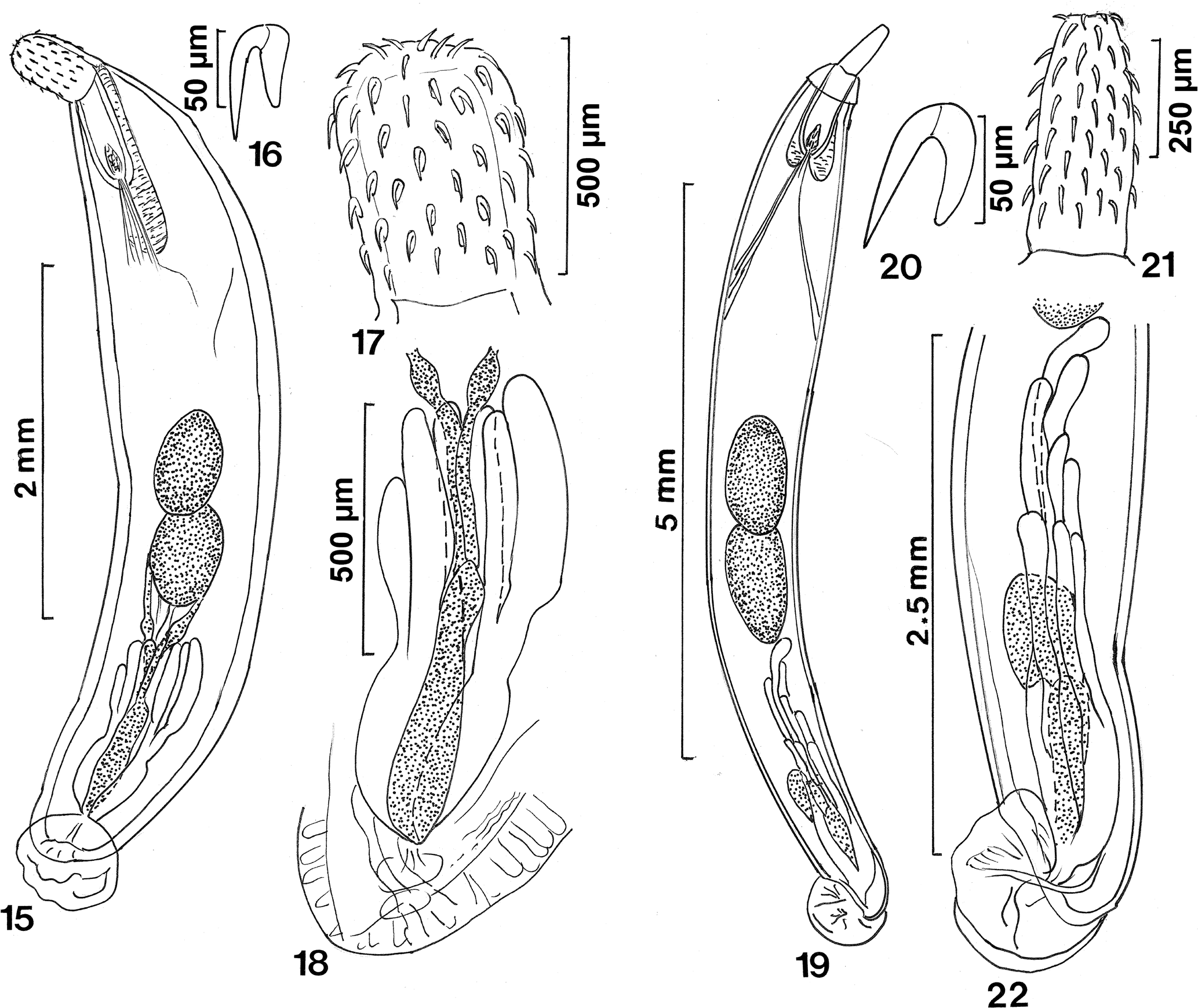

Scientific classification
- Domain: Eukaryota
- Kingdom: Animalia
- Phylum: Rotifera
- Class: Palaeacanthocephala
- Order: Echinorhynchida
- Family: Echinorhynchidae
- Genus: Pseudoacanthocephalus; Petrochenko, 1956

= Pseudoacanthocephalus =

Genus of worms

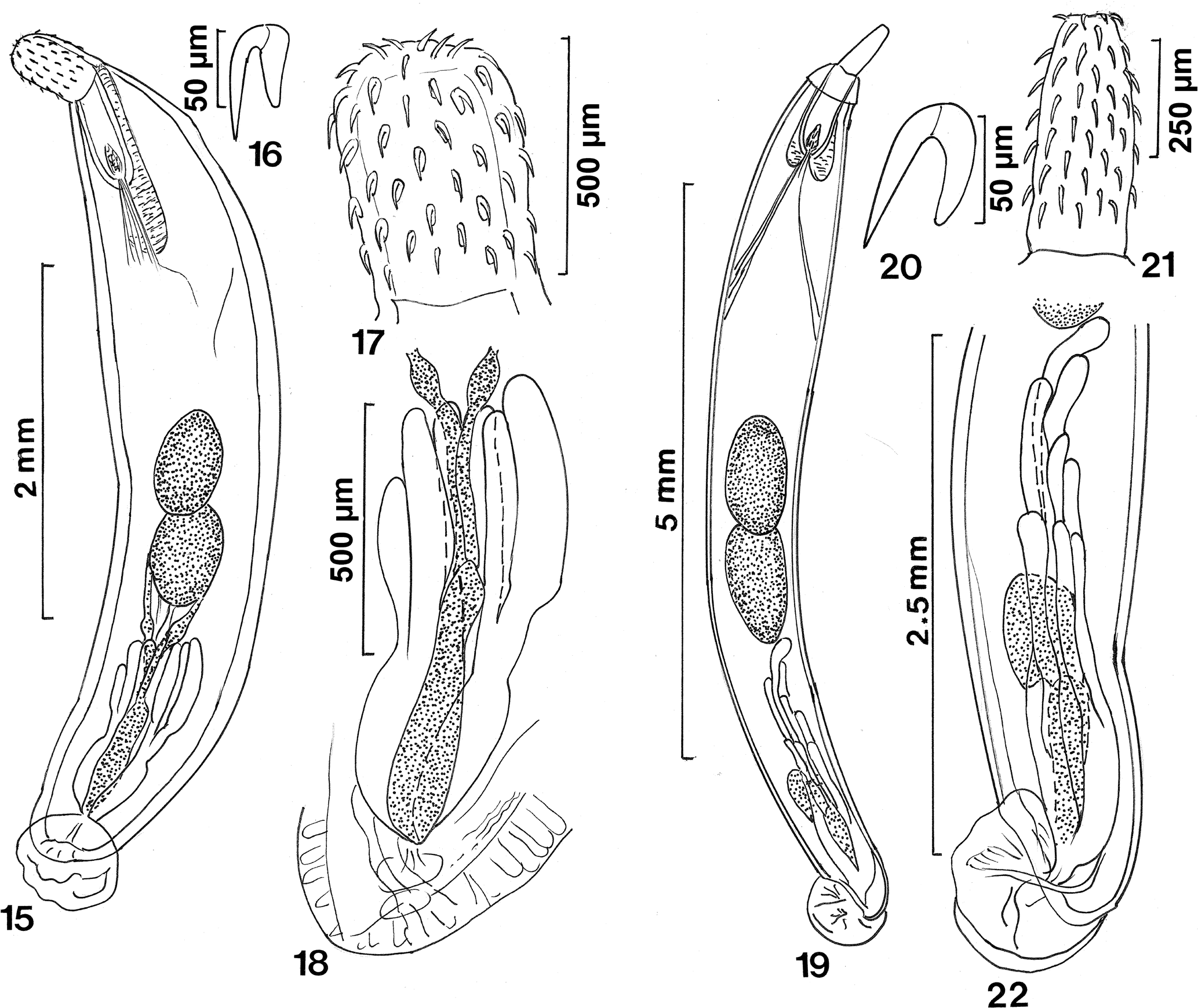
Anatomy of Acanthocephalus sp. (15–18) contrasted with Pseudoacanthocephalus sp. (19–22)

Pseudoacanthocephalus is a genus of parasitic worms belonging to the family Echinorhynchidae.

The genus has almost cosmopolitan distribution.

Species:

- Pseudoacanthocephalus betsileo Golvan, Houin & Bygoo, 1969
- Pseudoacanthocephalus bigueti (Houin, Golvan & Bygoo, 1965)
- Pseudoacanthocephalus bufonicola (Kostylew, 1941)
- Pseudoacanthocephalus bufonis (Shipley, 1903)
- Pseudoacanthocephalus caspanensis (Fernández & Ibarra Vidal, 1989)
- Pseudoacanthocephalus caucasicus (Petrochenko, 1953)
- Pseudoacanthocephalus coniformis Amin, Heckmann & Ha, 2014
- Pseudoacanthocephalus elongatus (Van Cleave, 1937)
- Pseudoacanthocephalus goodmani Smales, Allain, Wilkinson & Harris, 2020
- Pseudoacanthocephalus lucidus Nakao, 2016
- Pseudoacanthocephalus lutzi (Hamann, 1891)
- Pseudoacanthocephalus nguyenthileae Amin, Ha, & Heckmann, 2008
- Pseudoacanthocephalus nickoli Tkach, Lisitsyna, Crossley, Binh & Bush, 2013
- Pseudoacanthocephalus paratiensis Bhattacharya, 2000
- Pseudoacanthocephalus perthensis Edmonds, 1971
- Pseudoacanthocephalus rauschi Gupta & Fatma, 1986
- Pseudoacanthocephalus reesei Bush, Duszynski & Nickol, 2009
- Pseudoacanthocephalus rhampholeontos Smales, 2005
- Pseudoacanthocephalus shillongensis Bhattacharya, 1999
- Pseudoacanthocephalus smalesi Tkach, Lisitsyna, Crossley, Binh & Bush, 2013
- Pseudoacanthocephalus toshimai Nakao, 2016
- Pseudoacanthocephalus xenopeltidis (Shipley, 1903)
