= Acanthocephalus lucii =

Scientific classification
- Kingdom: Animalia
- Phylum: Acanthocephala
- Class: Palaeacanthocephala
- Order: Echinorhynchida
- Family: Echinorhynchidae
- Genus: Acanthocephalus
- Species: A. lucii

Binomial name
- Acanthocephalus lucii (Müller, 1776)

Species of thorny-headed worm

Acanthocephalus lucii, also known as the fish acanthocephalan, the spiny-headed worm, or the thorny-headed worm of fish, is a species of parasitic worms belonging to the family Echinorhynchidae.

It is native to Europe.
