= Harpagorhynchus =

Scientific classification
- Kingdom: Animalia
- Phylum: Acanthocephala
- Class: Palaeacanthocephala
- Order: Echinorhynchida
- Family: Echinorhynchidae
- Genus: Harpagorhynchus; Kvach & de Buron, 2019
- Species: H. golvaneuzeti

Binomial name
- Harpagorhynchus golvaneuzeti Kvach & de Buron, 2019

Genus of parasitic worms

Harpagorhynchus is a monotypic genus of acanthocephalans (thorny-headed or spiny-headed parasitic worms) containing a single species, Harpagorhynchus golvaneuzeti, that infests animals.

== Taxonomy ==
The species was described by Kvach and de Buron in 2019. The National Center for Biotechnology Information does not indicate that any phylogenetic analysis has been published on Harpagorhynchus that would confirm its position as a unique genus in the family Echinorhynchidae.

== Description ==
Harpagorhynchus golvaneuzeti consists of a proboscis covered in hooks and a long trunk.

== Distribution ==
The distribution of Harpagorhynchus golvaneuzeti is determined by that of its hosts. They have been found in Mediterranean Sea and the Sea of Marmara.

== Hosts ==
Life cycle of Acanthocephala. (Note: There are no known aberrant human infections for Harpagorhynchus golvaneuzeti species.)

The life cycle of an acanthocephalan consists of three stages beginning when an infective acanthor (development of an egg) is released from the intestines of the definitive host and then ingested by an arthropod, the intermediate host. Although the intermediate hosts of Harpagorhynchus are unknown, it is likely an arthropod. When the acanthor molts, the second stage called the acanthella begins. This stage involves penetrating the wall of the mesenteron or the intestine of the intermediate host and growing. The final stage is the infective cystacanth which is the larval or juvenile state of an Acanthocephalan, differing from the adult only in size and stage of sexual development. The cystacanths within the intermediate hosts are consumed by the definitive host, usually attaching to the walls of the intestines, and as adults they reproduce sexually in the intestines. The acanthor is passed in the feces of the definitive host and the cycle repeats. There may be paratenic hosts (hosts where parasites infest but do not undergo larval development or sexual reproduction) for Harpagorhynchus.

Harpagorhynchus golvaneuzeti parasitizes the Common sole (Solea solea). There are no reported cases of Harpagorhynchus golvaneuzeti infesting humans in the English language medical literature. But they may be medically important.

Hosts for Harpagorhynchus golvaneuzeti

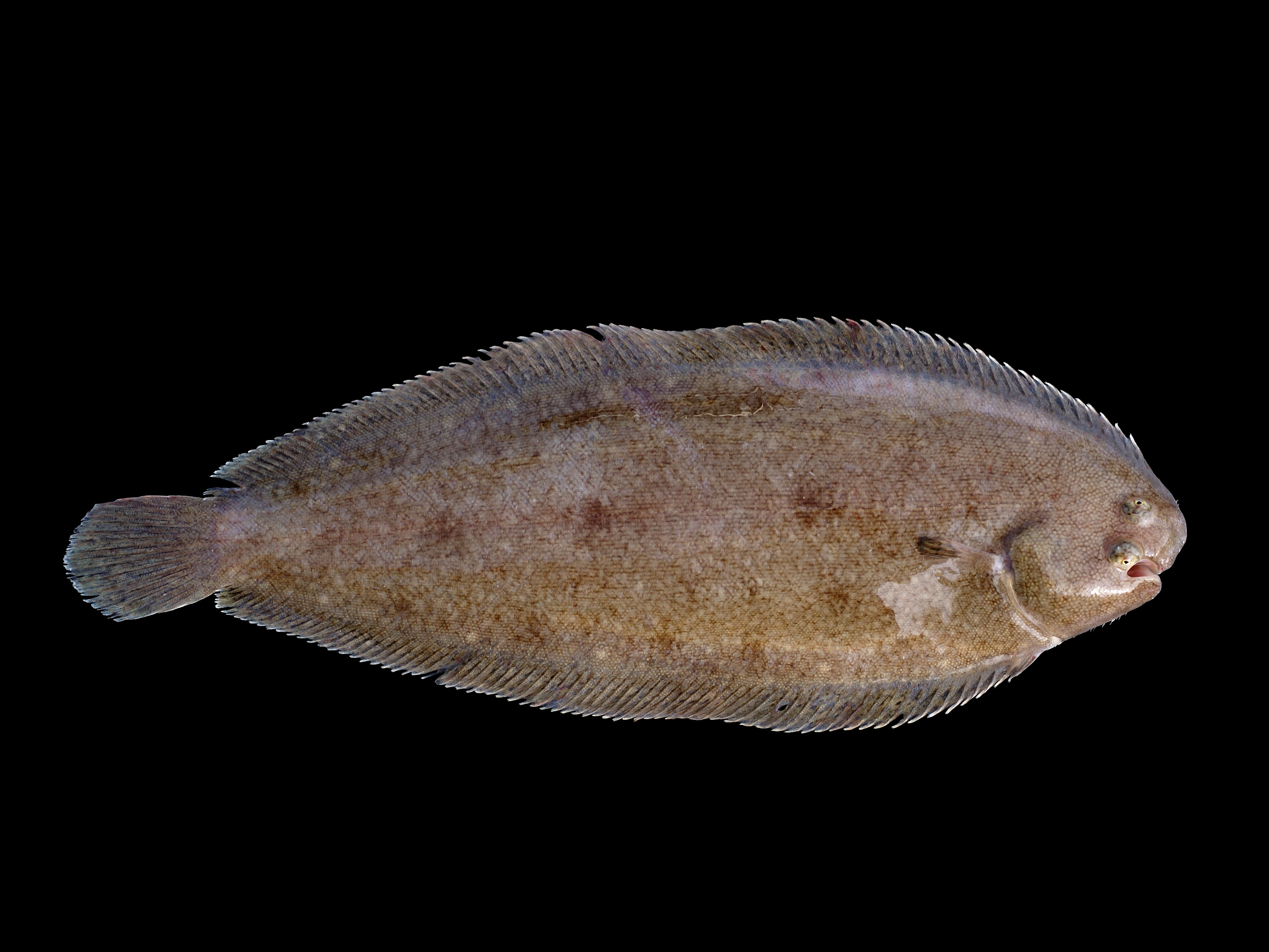
The common sole is a host for Harpagorhynchus golvaneuzeti
