= Herpetological society =

Term for group of reptile and amphibian enthusiasts

Herpetological society is a commonly used term for a club or organized group of reptile and amphibian enthusiasts. The term is derived from herpetology, the branch of zoology dealing with the study of those organisms.

Herpetological societies are typically non-profit, private organizations in which members pay dues for the benefit of the group. In general they are geographically focused around a specific state, province, or region, but most groups accept members from anywhere in the world. Some herptological societies run amphibian and/or reptile sanctuaries.

A few groups devote their endeavors to the most technical and scientific aspects of herpetology as a science, and therefore require academic or professional credentials of their members. However, most clubs are open to the public, having been founded by hobbyists and non-professionals to promote education and conservation while often sharing knowledge related to husbandry and breeding.

== Herpetological societies ==
- American Society of Ichthyologists and Herpetologists
- British Herpetological Society
- Madras Crocodile Bank Trust
- Philadelphia Herpetological Society
- The Society for the Study of Amphibians and Reptiles
