= Centrorhynchidae =

Scientific classification
- Kingdom: Animalia
- Phylum: Acanthocephala
- Class: Palaeacanthocephala
- Order: Polymorphida
- Family: Centrorhynchidae; Van Cleave, 1916

Family of thorny-headed worms

Centrorhynchidae is a family of parasitic worms. Three species of these thorny-headed worms in the genus Centrorhynchus were found to parasitize birds of prey and owls Slovakia. These hosts include Buteo buteo, Buteo rufinus, Falco tinnunculus, Asio otus, Strix aluco, Strix uralensis and Tyto alba.

== Species ==
Centrorhynchidae contains three genera and many species: (Note: A binomial authority in parentheses indicates that the species was originally described in a genus other than the present genus.)

=== Centrorhynchus ===
Centrorhynchus Lühe, 1911 contains numerous species:

- Centrorhynchus acanthotrias (von Linstow, 1883)
- Centrorhynchus albensis Rengaraju and Das, 1975
- Centrorhynchus albidus Meyer, 1932
- Centrorhynchus aluconis (Mueller, 1780)

The complete mitochondrial genome of C. aluconis has been sequenced.

- Centrorhynchus amini Khan, Muti-ur-Rahman, Bilqees and Khatoon, 2010
- Centrorhynchus amphibius Das, 1950
- Centrorhynchus appendiculatus (Westrumb, 1821)
- Centrorhynchus asturinus (Johnston, 1912)
- Centrorhynchus atheni Gupta and Fatma, 1983
- Centrorhynchus bancrofti (Johnston and Best, 1943)
- Centrorhynchus bazaleticus Kuraschvili, 1955
- Centrorhynchus bengalensis Datta and Soota, 1954
- Centrorhynchus bethaniae George and Nadakal, 1987
- Centrorhynchus bilqeesae Ghazi, Khan and Noorun-Nisa, 2005
- Centrorhynchus brama Rengaraju and Das, 1980
- Centrorhynchus brevicaudatus Das, 1949
- Centrorhynchus brumpti Golvan, 1965
- Centrorhynchus brygooi Golvan, 1965
- Centrorhynchus bubonis Yamaguti, 1939
- Centrorhynchus buckleyi Gupta and Fatma, 1983
- Centrorhynchus buteonis (Schrank, 1788)
- Centrorhynchus californicus Millzner, 1924
- Centrorhynchus chabaudi Golvan, 1958
- Centrorhynchus clitorideus (Meyer, 1931)
- Centrorhynchus conspectus Van Cleave and Pratt, 1940
- Centrorhynchus crotophagicola Schmidt and Neiland, 1966
- Centrorhynchus dimorphocephalus (Westrumb, 1821)
- Centrorhynchus dipsadis (Linstow, 1888)
- Centrorhynchus elongatus Yamaguti, 1935
- Centrorhynchus falconis (Johnston and Best, 1943)
- Centrorhynchus fasciatus (Westrumb, 1821)
- Centrorhynchus fisheri Bhattacharya, 1999
- Centrorhynchus freundi (Hartwick, 1953)
- Centrorhynchus fukiensis Wang, 1966
- Centrorhynchus galliardi Golvan, 1956
- Centrorhynchus gendrei (Golvan, 1957)
- Centrorhynchus gibsoni Khan, Ghazi and Bilqees, 2002
- Centrorhynchus giganteus Travassos, 1921
- Centrorhynchus glaucidii Wang, 1966
- Centrorhynchus globirostris Amin, Heckmann, Wilson, Keele, and Khan, 2014

C. globirostris infests the pheasant crow (Centropus sinensis) in Pakistan. A genetic analysis has been completed.

- Centrorhynchus globocaudatus (Zeder, 1800)
- Centrorhynchus golvani Anantaraman, et al., 1969
- Centrorhynchus grassei Golvan, 1965
- Centrorhynchus guira Lunaschi and Drago, 2010
- Centrorhynchus guptai Golvan, 1969
- Centrorhynchus hagiangensis (Petrochenko and Fan, 1969)
- Centrorhynchus halcyonicola Smales, 2011
- Centrorhynchus hartwichi Golvan, 1994
- Centrorhynchus horridus (Linstow, 1897)
- Centrorhynchus indicus Golvan, 1956
- Centrorhynchus insularis Tubangui, 1833
- Centrorhynchus itatsinsis Fukui, 1929
- Centrorhynchus javanicans Rengaraju and Das, 1975
- Centrorhynchus knowlesi Datta and Soota, 1955
- Centrorhynchus kuntzi Schmidt and Neiland, 1966
- Centrorhynchus latai Golvan, 1994
- Centrorhynchus leptorhynchus Meyer, 1932
- Centrorhynchus longicephalus Das, 1950
- Centrorhynchus lucknowensis Gupta and Fatma, 1983
- Centrorhynchus mabuiae (Linstow, 1908)
- Centrorhynchus macrorchis Das, 1949
- Centrorhynchus madagascariensis (Golvan, 1957)
- Centrorhynchus magnus Fukui, 1929
- Centrorhynchus mariauxi Smales, 2011
- Centrorhynchus merulae Dolfus and Golvan, 1961
- Centrorhynchus microcephalus (Bravo-hollis, 1947)
- Centrorhynchus migrans Zuberi and Faroog, 1974
- Centrorhynchus milvus Ward, 1956
- Centrorhynchus mysentri Gupta and Fatma, 1983
- Centrorhynchus nahuelhuapensis Steinauer, Flores and Rauque, 2020

C. nahuelhuapensis was found in the intestine of the rufous-legged owl (Strix rufipes) in Patagonia, Argentina. The proboscis is armed with 31–33 rows of hooks 16 or 17 hooks per row. The hooks in each row are distributed into 5 true hooks, 4 transitional hooks, and 7–8 spiniform hooks. It has three cement glands. The worm has a filiform body. Phylogenetic analysis was conducted using the small and large ribosomal subunits confirming the placement of this species in the genus Centrorhynchus.

- Centrorhynchus narcissae Florescu, 1942
- Centrorhynchus nicaraguensis Schmidt and Neiland, 1966
- Centrorhynchus nickoli Khan, Bilqees and Ghazi, 2001
- Centrorhynchus ninni (Stossich, 1891)
- Centrorhynchus owli Bhattacharya, 1999
- Centrorhynchus paramaryasis Amin, 2013
- Centrorhynchus petrochenkoi Kuraschvilli, 1955
- Centrorhynchus polemaeti Troncy, 1970
- Centrorhynchus ptyasus Gupta, 1950
- Centrorhynchus pycnonoti Wang, 1986
- Centrorhynchus renardi (Lindemann, 1865)
- Centrorhynchus robustus Richardson and Nickol, 1995
- Centrorhynchus sharmai Gupta and Lata, 1966
- Centrorhynchus sholapurensis Rengaraju and Das, 1975
- Centrorhynchus sikkimensis Bhattacharya, 2003
- Centrorhynchus simplex Meyer, 1932
- Centrorhynchus sindhensis Khan, Khatoon and Bilqees, 2002
- Centrorhynchus sinicus Wang, 1966
- Centrorhynchus smyrnensis Bhattacharya, 2007
- Centrorhynchus spilornae Schmidt and Kuntz, 1969
- Centrorhynchus spinosus (Kaiser, 1893)
- Centrorhynchus tumidulus (Rudolphi, 1819)
- Centrorhynchus tyotensis Rengaraju and Das, 1975
- Centrorhynchus undulatus Dollfus, 1951

=== Neolacunisoma ===
Neolacunisoma Amin and Canaris, 1997 contains only one genus:

- Neolacunisoma geraldschmidti Amin and Canaris, 1997

=== Sphaerirostris ===
Sphaerirostris Golvan, 1956 contains many species:

- Sphaerirostris areolatus (Rudolphi, 1819)
- Sphaerirostris batrachus (Das, 1952)
- Sphaerirostris bipartitus (Soloviev, 1912)
- Sphaerirostris cinctus (Rudolphi, 1819)
- Sphaerirostris corvi (Fukui, 1929)
- Sphaerirostris dollfusi Golvan, 1994
- Sphaerirostris embae (Cholodkowski and Kostylew, 1916)
- Sphaerirostris erraticus (Chandler, 1925)
- Sphaerirostris globuli (Nama and Rathore, 1984)
- Sphaerirostris lancea (Westrumb, 1821)
- Sphaerirostris lanceoides (Petrochenko, 1949)
- Sphaerirostris leguminosus (Soloviev, 1912)
- Sphaerirostris lesiniformis (Molin, 1859)
- Sphaerirostris maryasis (Datta, 1932)
- Sphaerirostris opimus (Travassos, 1919)
- Sphaerirostris physocoracis (Porta, 1913)
- Sphaerirostris picae (Rudolphi, 1819)
- Sphaerirostris pinguis (Van Cleave, 1918)
- Sphaerirostris reptans (Bhalerao, 1931)
- Sphaerirostris robustus (Datta, 1928)
- Sphaerirostris saxicoloides (Nama and Rathore, 1984)
- Sphaerirostris scanensis (Lundström, 1942)
- Sphaerirostris serpenticola (Linstow, 1908)
- Sphaerirostris skrjabini (Petrochenko, 1949)
- Sphaerirostris tenuicaudatus (Marotel, 1889)
- Sphaerirostris turdi (Yamaguti, 1939)
- Sphaerirostris wertheimae Schmidt, 1975
