= Circinatechinorhynchus =

Scientific classification
- Kingdom: Animalia
- Phylum: Acanthocephala
- Class: Palaeacanthocephala
- Order: Echinorhynchida
- Family: Echinorhynchidae
- Subfamily: Circinatechinorhynchinae; Bhattacharya, 2007
- Genus: Circinatechinorhynchus; Bhattacharya, 2007
- Species: C. pseudorhombi

Binomial name
- Circinatechinorhynchus pseudorhombi Bhattacharya, 2007

Genus of thorny-headed worms

Circinatechinorhynchus is a genus of parasitic worms belonging to the family Echinorhynchidae (spiny-headed worms). It was discovered by Subhendu Bikas Bhattacharya in 2007. Circinatechinorhynchus is monotypic, containing the single species Circinatechinorhynchus pseudorhombi.

== Hosts and pathology ==
Life cycle of Acanthocephala (Note: A 2001 survey of the literature found no known cases of human infection by Circinatechinorhynchus.)

The specific life cycle of Circinatechinorhynchus is unknown, but the life cycle of acanthocephala (thorny-headed worms) in general unfolds in three distinct stages. It begins when an egg develops into an infective form known as an acanthor. This acanthor is released with the feces of its definitive host, typically a vertebrate, and must be ingested by an intermediate host, an arthropod such as an insect, to continue its development. Although the specific intermediate hosts for the genus Circinatechinorhynchus are unidentified, it is generally accepted that insects serve as the primary intermediaries as they make up the diet of the host.

Inside the intermediate host, the acanthor molts its outer layer, becoming an acanthella (the immature larval stage). At this stage it burrows into the host's intestinal wall and continues to grow. The life cycle culminates in the formation of a cystacanth, a larval stage able to infect the definitive host while retaining juvenile features (differing from the adult only in size and stage of sexual development), which awaits ingestion by the definitive host to mature fully. Once inside the definitive host, these larvae attach themselves to the intestinal wall using the hooks on their proboscis, mature into sexually reproductive adults, and complete the cycle by releasing new acanthors into the host's feces.

A survey of the medical literature published in 2021 did not list Circinatechinorhynchus as infecting humans.
