= Karl Rudolphi =

Swedish-German biologist (1771–1832)

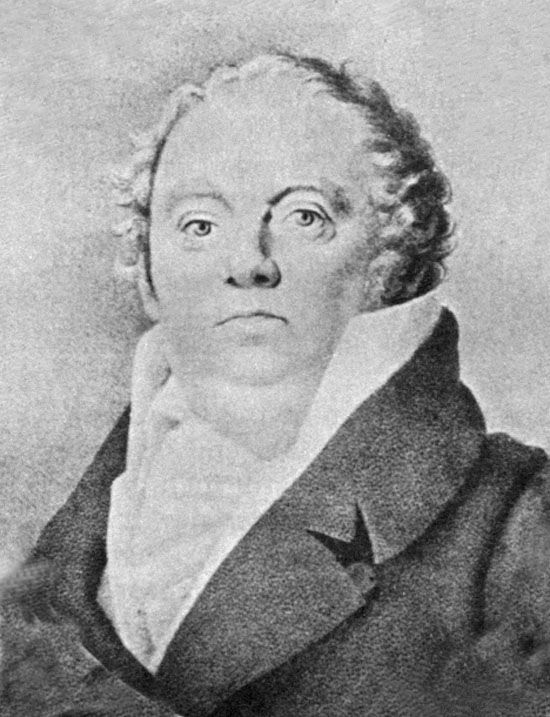
- Born: Karl Asmund Rudolphi; 14 July 1771; Stockholm, Sweden
- Died: 29 November 1832 (aged 61); Berlin, German Confederation
- Education: University of Greifswald (PhD, 1793, M.D., 1794)
- Known for: Father of helminthology Sei whale
- Scientific career
- Fields: Natural history
- Institutions: University of Greifswald; University of Berlin
- Thesis: Observationes circa vermes intestinales (1794)
- Doctoral advisor: Christian von Weigel
- Doctoral students: Johannes Peter Müller
- Author abbrev. (botany): Rudolphi

Karl Asmund Rudolphi (14 July 1771 – 29 November 1832) was a Swedish-born German naturalist, who is credited with being the "father of helminthology".

== Life ==
Rudolphi was born in Stockholm to German parents. He was awarded his PhD in 1793 and his medical doctorate in 1794 from the University of Greifswald, where he was appointed Professor of Anatomy. He worked widely across the fields of botany, zoology, anatomy and physiology. He investigated the anatomy of nerves, carried out studies of plant growth and was an early champion of the view that the cell is the basic structural unit of plants. In 1804, Karl Rudolphi, along with J.H.F. Link were awarded the prize for "solving the problem of the nature of cells" by the Königliche Societät der Wissenschaft (Royal Society of Science), Göttingen, for proving that cells had independent rather than common walls.

His first great publication was a study of parasitic worms, the Enterozoorum Sive Vermium Intestinalium Historia Naturalis. This is the first publication to describe the Nematoda. His second, the "Synopsis cui accedunt mantissima duplex et indices locupletissima" was the first work to detail the life cycle of important nematode parasites of humans, such as Ascaris lumbricoides.

In 1810 he was appointed Professor of Anatomy and Physiology at the University of Berlin, a position he held until his death. He served two terms as rector of the University, and founded the |Berlin Zootomical Museum (later the Museum für Naturkunde). In 1816, he was elected a foreign member of the Royal Swedish Academy of Sciences.

In 1821, Rudolphi published his "Grundriss der Physiologie", where he argued that the human genus should be divided into species, not into races. His work therefore predates "scientific" racism of the Nazi period in German and Scandinavian countries.

Rudolphi died in Berlin in 1832, and was succeeded in his position at the University of Berlin by his greatest student, Johannes Müller. Rudolphi is remembered in numerous species names such as the sei whale, known in older literature as "Rudolphi's Whale" (Turner 1882) or "Rudolphi's rorqual" (e.g. Cocks 1886; Collett 1886; Haldane 1906, 1909; Thompson 1919). He is also commemorated by the German Parasitological Society, who award the Rudolphi Medal for scientific excellence.
