= British Herpetological Society =

- Website: https://www.thebhs.org/

History
- Founded: 1947
- Founder: Malcolm A. Smith

Current Executive
- President: Gerardo Garcia
- Immediate Past-President: Richard A. Griffiths
- Chairman: Mark Hollowell
- Treasurer: Michael Wise
- Secretary: Trevor Rose

The British Herpetological Society (BHS) is an international herpetological society based in the United Kingdom. The BHS is a non-profit organization with goals to support the conservation, education and captive care of reptiles and amphibians. The society regularly publishes the Herpetological Journal and Herpetological Bulletin on a quarterly basis. It is one of the oldest international herpetological societies and is recognized worldwide for its support in conservation, research and other relevant activities.

== History ==
The society was established in 1947 with the help of Dr Malcolm A. Smith who was a physician who practised in the Royal Court of Siam. Whilst in Siam (present day Thailand), Dr Smith studied the herpetofauna as well as that of south-east Asia. After retiring, he returned to Britain where he developed an interest in the native reptiles and amphibians. This led him founding the society as a way to promote the values he saw fit in regards to the herpetofauna of the British Isles and the wider landscape.

=== Past Presidents ===
Past presidents of the British Herpetological Society, listed by retirement date:

- Dr. M. A. Smith (1956)
- Dr. J. F. D. Frazer (1981)
- The Earl of Cranbrook (1990)
- Prof. J. L. Cloudsley-Thompson (1996)
- Dr. R. Avery (1997)
- Dr. H. Robert Bustard (2005)
- Prof. T. J. C. Beebee (2013)
- Prof. R. A. Griffiths (2018)

== Publications ==
The BHS publishes a small number of publications such as:

- Herpetological Journal (formerly British Journal of Herpetology)
- Herpetological Bulletin (formerly The British Herpetological Society Bulletin)
- Natterjack
- British Herpetological Society Reports
