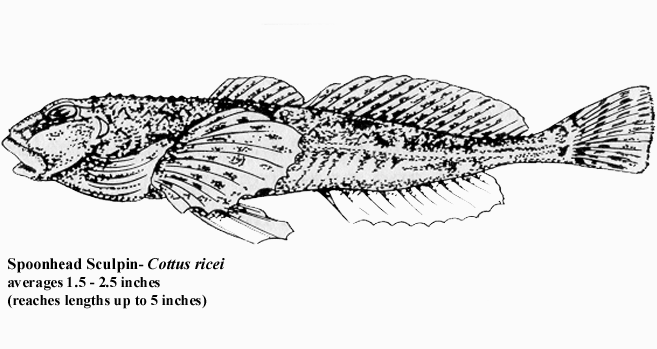

Conservation status
- Least Concern (IUCN 3.1)

Scientific classification
- Kingdom: Animalia
- Phylum: Chordata
- Class: Actinopterygii
- Order: Perciformes
- Suborder: Cottoidei
- Family: Cottidae
- Genus: Cottus
- Species: C. ricei

Binomial name
- Cottus ricei (E. W. Nelson, 1876)
- Spoonhead sculpin range

Synonyms
- Cottopsis ricei E. W. Nelson, 1876; Uranidea pollicaris Jordan & Gilbert, 1882; Cottus pollicaris (Jordan & Gilbert, 1882); Cottus onychus C. H. Eigenmann & Eigenmann, 1892

= Spoonhead sculpin =

Species of fish

The spoonhead sculpin (Cottus ricei) is a species of freshwater ray-finned fish belonging to the family Cottidae, the typical sculpins. This species is widespread in northeastern North America.

== Taxonomy ==
The spoonhead sculpin was first formally described as Cottopsis ricei by the American naturalist and ethnologist Edward William Nelson with its type locality given as Lake Michigan near Evanston in Cook County, Illinois. It is classified within the nominate subgenus of the genus Cottus. The specific name honors Nelson's friend F.L. Rice who collected the type.

== Description ==
Spoonhead sculpins do not have scales but instead are covered in small, fine, curved spines. They have a flat triangular shaped head and a cylindrical shaped body that is depressed from top to bottom and their body tapers from the head down to the tail. They have very defined preopercular spines. Their fins are long and round and their coloration ranges from greenish brown to light yellow and they are white underneath and their bodies are speckled. Spoonhead sculpins average length is about 1.5 to 2.4 inches, however, the largest sculpin on record was 5.3 inches. Their eyes are positioned on top of their head and they have a very large mouth that opens on the ventral surface, in the inferior position. This allows them to feed on the bottom of rivers and lakes. They also have a complete lateral line that extends to the caudal peduncle (between the end of the anal fin and the base of the caudal fin), this allows them to detect movement in the water. Spoonhead sculpins have four soft pelvic rays (soft-rays are thin and flexible), 14–16 pectoral rays, one chin pore and three preopercular spines. They do not have palatine teeth. These fish usually live to be 6 years old compared to slimy sculpins that usually live for 5 years and deepwater sculpins live for 7 years. The spoonhead sculpin does not contain a swim bladder which, allows it to rest on the bottom of lakes and rivers. Also they are sensitive to low frequencies of sound and less sensitive to high frequencies of sound. They have a rounded caudal or tail fin.

== Range ==
The spoonhead sculpin can be found in Canada from southern Quebec to the Mackenzie River in the Northwest and Yukon Territories and in British Columbia. They are also found in northern Ohio, Montana, and in many of the Great Lakes like Lake Superior and Lake Erie. However, due to the large amount of pollution in Lake Erie the spoonhead population there is dwindling. The spoonhead is also a native Montana fish that can be found in the St. Mary and Waterton river drainages of Glacier National Park. They are generally found in fast flowing rivers and deep lakes.

== Habitat ==
Spoonhead sculpins are found in fast flowing streams or in deep lakes. These fish prefer habitats that contain bedrock, boulder, cobble, rubble and logs to hide from their predators such as trout and other large lake fishes.

== Diet ==
Not much is known about their diet but they most likely eat aquatic insects such as stoneflies and plankton. These fish are prey to larger game fish such as northern pike, lake trout, and burbot. They can also be prey to mammals and birds if they are living in shallow water.

== Reproduction ==
The spoonhead sculpin is sexually mature at two years of age when it gets to be about 7.0–8.0 cm in length. Spawning occurs in the fall when males will go out, find, and defend territories from other males. Once a territory is established the male will drive other males away from his territory, which includes a nest site. Males will select nest sites under rocks. Then they try to attract females with the quality of their territory and have the female lay her eggs and attach them to the undersurface of the rocks in the nest site. Then he drives the females away from the nests after he has fertilized them. Males can sometimes be polygynous but this is usually correlated to the male's size and to how many eggs he can guard at one time. The male will guard the nest until the eggs hatch, this generally happens 21 days after fertilization. Female fecundity ranges from 280 to 1200 eggs and is also correlated to female size.
