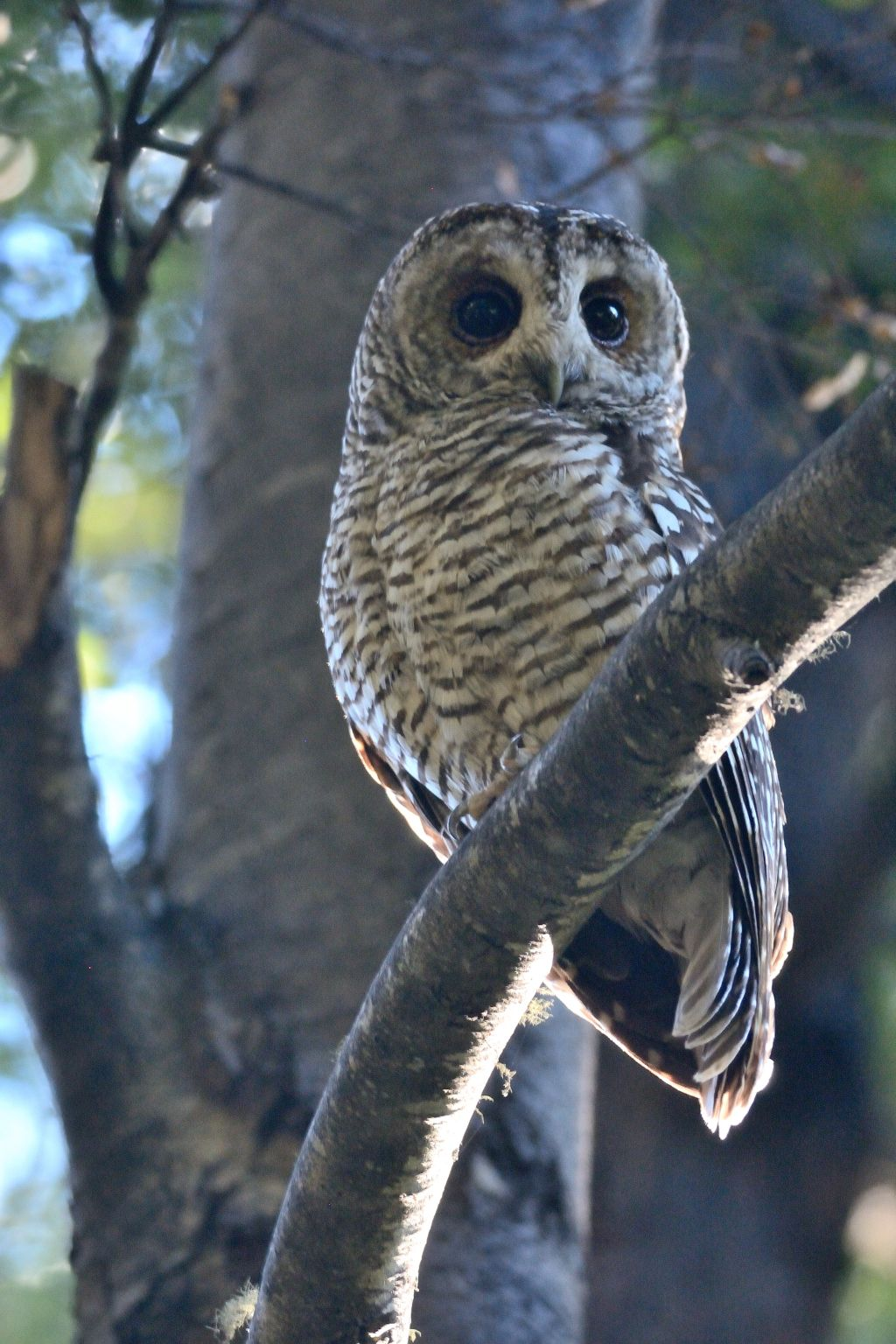
- Adult, Ñuble forest, Chile

Conservation status
- Least Concern (IUCN 3.1)
- CITES Appendix II

Scientific classification
- Kingdom: Animalia
- Phylum: Chordata
- Class: Aves
- Order: Strigiformes
- Family: Strigidae
- Genus: Strix
- Species: S. rufipes

Binomial name
- Strix rufipes King, 1827

= Rufous-legged owl =

Species of owl

The rufous-legged owl (Strix rufipes) is a medium-sized owl. It is found in Argentina and Chile.

== Taxonomy and systematics ==
The rufous-legged owl has two subspecies, the nominate S. r. rufipes and S. r. sanborni. The latter is known from a single immature specimen. At one time what is now treated as the Chaco owl (S. chacoensis) was also considered to be a subspecies of rufous-legged owl, but the two differ in plumage, morphology, and voice.

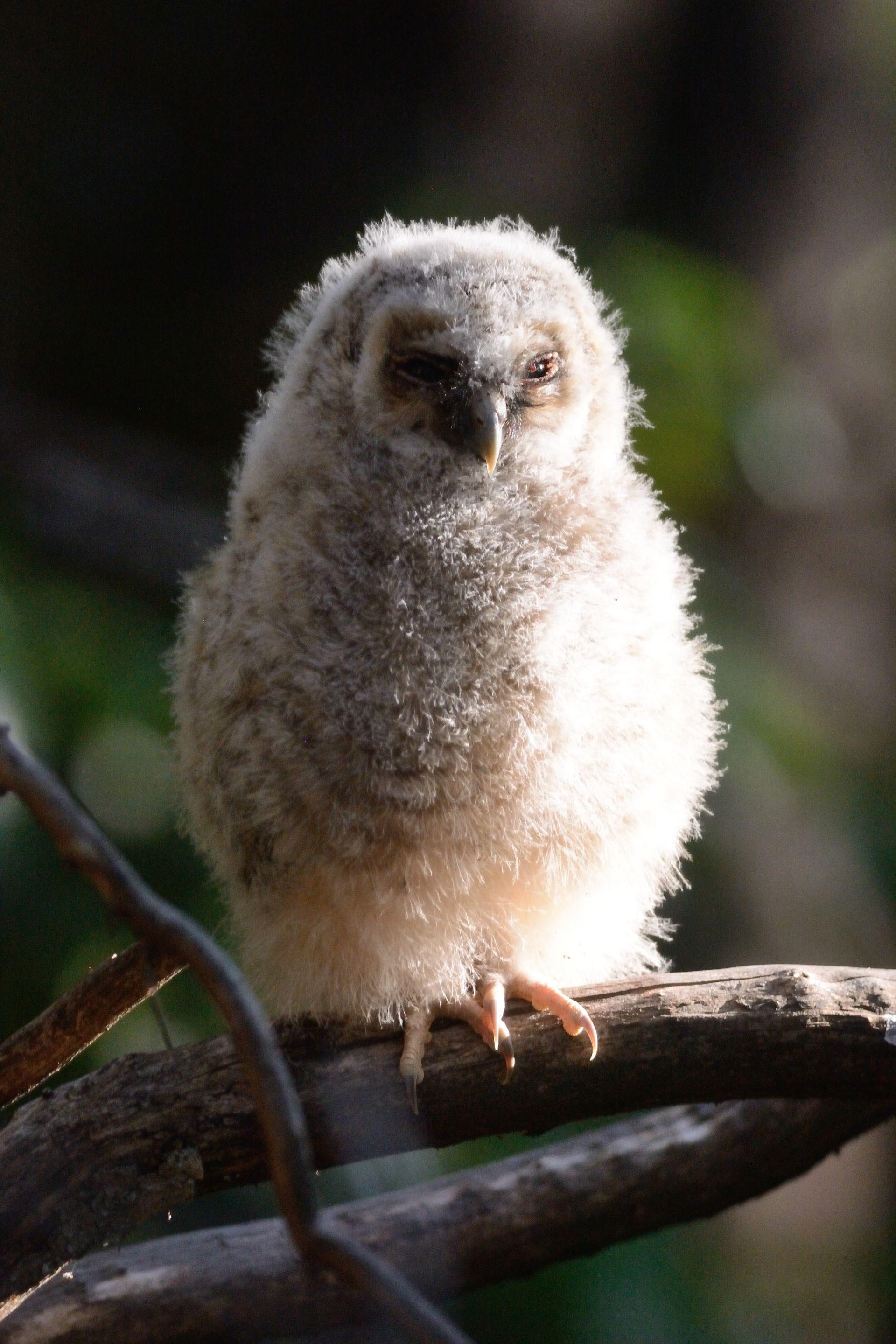
Chick, Ñuble forest, Chile

== Description ==
The rufous-legged owl is compact, with a round head and no ear tufts. It is 33 to 38 cm (13 to 15 in) long and weighs about 350 g (12 oz); females are larger than males. Adults have a rusty facial disk, white "brows" over dark brown eyes, and white lores. Its upperparts are dark reddish brown with narrow orange-buff bars and spots. The tail is also reddish brown, with buff bars. The throat is white, most of the underparts are buffy white with many black bars, and the vent area is orange-buff. The legs and toes are covered with buffy feathers. The chick is downy off-white. The juvenile is a warm buff with faint dusky brown barring and a tawny face.

== Distribution ==
The rufous-legged owl is found in Chile from approximately Valparaíso Province and in far western Argentina from approximately Mendoza Province south to the tip of Tierra del Fuego. The one specimen of S. r. sanborni was taken on Chiloé Island off the coast of south-central Chile. The species primarily inhabits moist old-growth forest with a closed canopy and a dense understory. It is also found in older secondary forest and semi-open forest. In elevation it ranges from sea level to at least 2,000 m (6,600 ft).

== Behavior ==
=== Feeding ===
The rufous-legged owl is nocturnal and usually hunts from a perch. Its primary prey is small arboreal mammals. Birds, amphibians, and insects are also taken but account for only a small percentage of its diet.

=== Breeding ===
The rufous-legged owl's breeding phenology is poorly known. It probably lays eggs beginning in October; the clutch size is one to three eggs. It usually nests in a tree cavity, either natural or excavated by a woodpecker. It occasionally will use an old raptor nest and is thought to possibly nest on the ground as well.

=== Vocalization ===
The rufous-legged owl's vocalizations are "a variety of grunting, hooting, and cackling noises."

== Status ==
The IUCN has assessed the rufous-legged owl as being of Least Concern. It occurs in several protected areas but outside them is potentially threatened by logging of its mature-forest habitat.
