= Herpetology =

Study of amphibians and reptiles

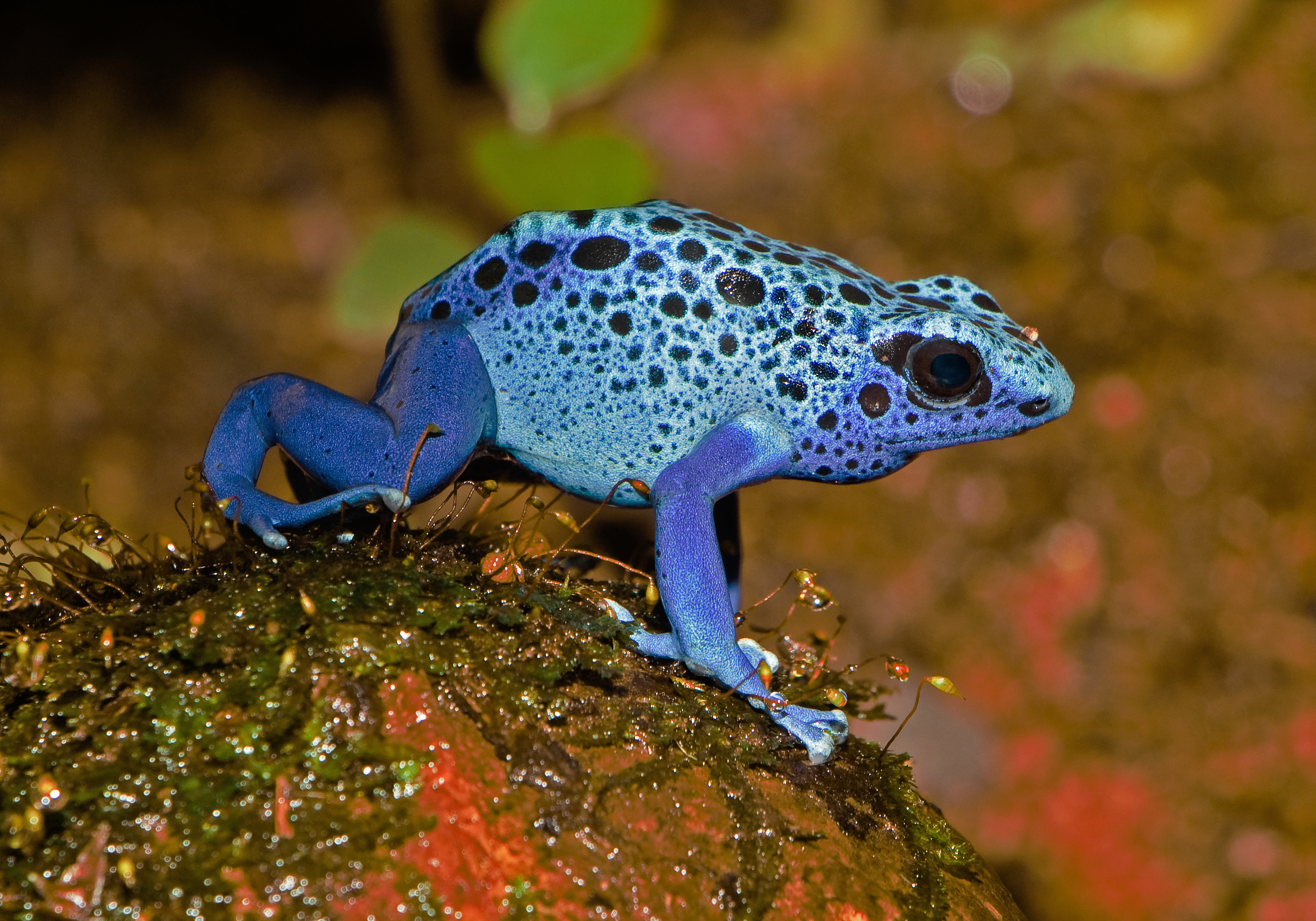
Blue poison dart frog

Herpetology (from Ancient Greek ἑρπετόν herpetón, meaning "reptile" or "creeping animal") is a branch of zoology concerned with the study of amphibians (including frogs, salamanders, and caecilians (Gymnophiona)) and reptiles (including snakes, lizards, turtles, crocodilians, and tuataras). Birds, which are cladistically included within Reptilia, are traditionally excluded here; the separate scientific study of birds is the subject of ornithology.

The precise definition of herpetology is the study of ectothermic (cold-blooded) tetrapods. This definition of "herps" (otherwise called "herptiles" or "herpetofauna") excludes fish; however, herpetological and ichthyological scientific societies often collaborate. For instance, groups such as the American Society of Ichthyologists and Herpetologists have co-published journals and hosted conferences to foster the exchange of ideas between the fields. Herpetological societies are formed to promote interest in reptiles and amphibians, both captive and wild.

Herpetological studies can offer benefits relevant to other fields by providing research on the role of amphibians and reptiles in global ecology. For example, by monitoring amphibians that are very sensitive to environmental changes, herpetologists record visible warnings that significant climate changes are taking place. Although they can be deadly, some toxins and venoms produced by reptiles and amphibians are useful in human medicine. Currently, some snake venom has been used to create anti-coagulants that work to treat strokes and heart attacks.

== Naming and etymology ==
The word herpetology is from the Ancient Greek words ἑρπετόν (herpetón), meaning "creeping animal", and λόγος (lógos), meaning "study".

"Herp" is a vernacular term for non-avian reptiles and amphibians. It is derived from the Greek term "herpeton", with roots back to Linnaeus's classification of animals, in which he grouped reptiles and amphibians in the same class. There are over 6700 species of amphibians and over 9000 species of reptiles. Despite its modern taxonomic irrelevance, the term has persisted, particularly in the names of herpetology, the scientific study of non-avian reptiles and amphibians, and herpetoculture, the captive care and breeding of reptiles and amphibians.

== Subfields ==
The field of herpetology can be divided into areas dealing with particular taxonomic groups such as frogs and other amphibians (batrachology), snakes (ophiology or ophidiology), lizards (saurology) and turtles (cheloniology, chelonology, or testudinology).

More generally, herpetologists work on functional problems in the ecology, evolution, physiology, behavior, taxonomy, or molecular biology of amphibians and reptiles. Amphibians or reptiles can be used as model organisms for specific questions in these fields, such as the role of frogs in the ecology of a wetland. All of these areas are related through their evolutionary history, an example being the evolution of viviparity (including behavior and reproduction).

== Careers ==
Career options in the field of herpetology include lab research, field studies and surveys, assistance in veterinary and medical procedures, zoological staff, museum staff, and college teaching.

In modern academic science, it is rare for an individual to consider themselves solely to be a herpetologist. Most individuals focus on a particular field such as ecology, evolution, taxonomy, physiology, or molecular biology, and within that field ask questions pertaining to or best answered by examining reptiles and amphibians. For example, an evolutionary biologist who is also a herpetologist may choose to work on an issue such as the evolution of warning coloration in coral snakes.

Modern herpetological writers include Mark O'Shea and Philip Purser. Modern herpetological showmen include Jeff Corwin, Steve Irwin (popularly known as the "Crocodile Hunter"), and Austin Stevens, popularly known as "Austin Snakeman" in the TV series Austin Stevens: Snakemaster.

Herpetology is an established hobby around the world due to the varied biodiversity in many environments. Many amateur herpetologists call themselves as "herpers".

== Study ==
Most colleges or universities do not offer a major in herpetology at the undergraduate or the graduate level. Instead, persons interested in herpetology select a major in the biological sciences. The knowledge learned about all aspects of the biology of animals is then applied to an individual study of herpetology.

== Journals ==
Herpetology research is published in academic journals including Ichthyology & Herpetology, founded in 1913 (under the name Copeia in honour of Edward Drinker Cope); Herpetologica, founded in 1936; Reptiles and amphibians, founded in 1990; and Contemporary Herpetology, founded in 1997 and stopped publishing in 2009.

== See also ==
- Herping
- List of herpetologists
- List of herpetology academic journals
- Reptile Database
- AmphibiaWeb
