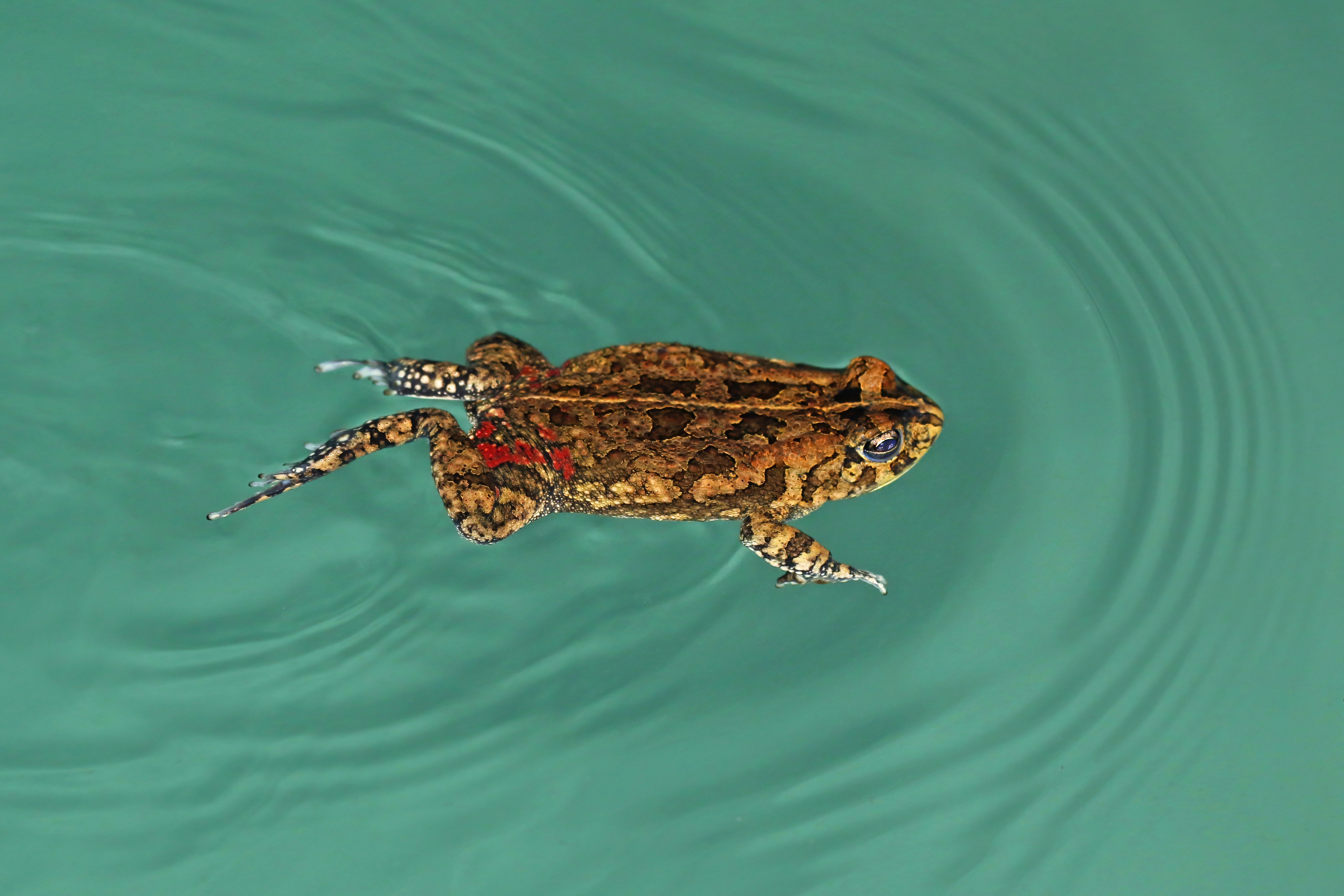

Conservation status
- Least Concern (IUCN 3.1)

Scientific classification
- Kingdom: Animalia
- Phylum: Chordata
- Class: Amphibia
- Order: Anura
- Family: Bufonidae
- Genus: Sclerophrys
- Species: S. gutturalis

Binomial name
- Sclerophrys gutturalis (Power, 1927)

Synonyms
- Bufo gutturalis Power, 1927

= Sclerophrys gutturalis =

Species of amphibian

Sclerophrys gutturalis, the African common toad or guttural toad, is a species of toad in the family Bufonidae. It is found in Africa in a region stretching from Kenya west to Angola and south to South Africa. This includes southern Angola, Botswana, Democratic Republic of the Congo, Ethiopia, Eswatini, Kenya, Lesotho, Malawi, Mauritius, Mozambique, Namibia, Réunion, Somalia, South Africa, Tanzania, Zambia, and Zimbabwe. Its natural habitats include forest, savanna and wetland areas. In particular, subtropical or tropical dry forest, subtropical or tropical moist lowland forest, subtropical or tropical moist montane forest, dry savanna, moist savanna, temperate shrubland, subtropical or tropical dry shrubland, subtropical or tropical moist shrubland, subtropical or tropical dry lowland grassland, subtropical or tropical seasonally wet or flooded lowland grassland, subtropical or tropical high-altitude grassland, intermittent rivers, freshwater lakes, intermittent freshwater lakes, freshwater marshes, intermittent freshwater marshes, arable land, pastureland, rural gardens, urban areas, heavily degraded former forest, ponds, and canals and ditches.

== Description ==
The guttural toad is a large species with males growing to a snout-to-vent length of up to 90 mm (3.5 in) and females 120 mm (4.7 in). The upper surface is buffish brown with variable irregular dark brown markings. There are two pairs of brown spots between the eyes making a cross-like mark, and there is often a pale stripe down the spine. The arms are edged by distinctive white tubercles and there is a red patch on the back of the thighs. The underparts are pale and granular and the male has a dark throat. The parotid glands are prominent and the toes are only slightly webbed.

== Biology ==
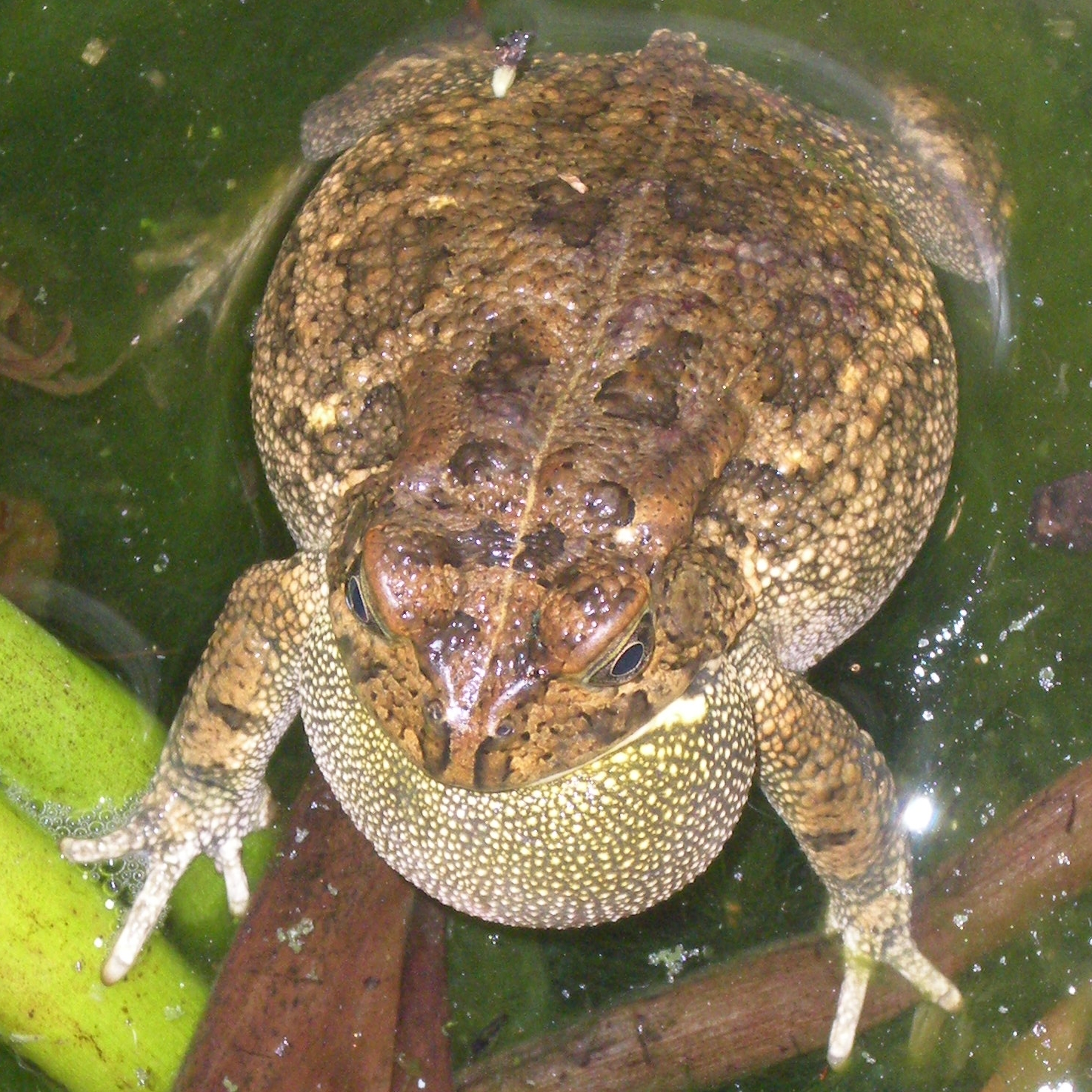
Male calling

Males call throughout the year but the main period for breeding is October and November. The sound is a guttural "snore" repeated at intervals of about three seconds. The males call from the surface of permanent water bodies and large congregations can take place, making a "chorus". The eggs are laid in double strings which may be wound around submerged vegetation. The tadpoles develop for about 75 days before undergoing metamorphosis. They may be so numerous leaving the ponds as to carpet the ground and many are eaten by predators.

== Conservation status ==
The guttural toad is very common. It is spreading through southern Africa as its population increases. It can live in a variety of environments, and is very adaptable. It has no major predators and does not suffer much from habitat loss.
