= Otto Friedrich Bernhard von Linstow =

German high-ranking medical officer and helminthologist

- Born: 17 October 1842; Itzehoe, Germany
- Died: 3 May 1916 (aged 73); Göttingen, Germany
- Education: University of Kiel
- Known for: Compendium der Helminthology
- Scientific career
- Fields: Zoology, Helminthology

Otto Friedrich Bernhard von Linstow (17 October 1842 – 3 May 1916) was a German high-ranking medical officer (Oberstabsarzt und Regimentsarzt) and helminthologist. Von Linstow was born in Itzehoe north west of Hamburg. He received his medical PhD in 1864 at the University of Kiel and worked as military doctor in Hameln, later in Göttingen, where he was promoted to a major. He published his book Compendium der Helminthology in 1878 in Hannover. Von Linstow died 3 May 1916 in Göttingen.

== Written works ==
- Compendium der helminthologie. Ein verzeichniss der bekannten helminthen, die frei oder in thierischen körpern leben, geordnet nach ihren wohnthieren, unter angabe der organe, in denen sie gefunden sind, und mit beifügung der litteraturquellen, (1878) - Compendium of helminthology: A directory of known helminths, etc.
- "Report on the Entozoa collected by H.M.S. Challenger during the years 1873-76", (1880).
- Die Giftthiere und ihre Wirkung auf den Menschen : ein Handbuch für Mediciner, (1894) - Venomous creatures and their effect on humans: a handbook for physicians.
- Nemathelminthen, (1896) - Nemathelminthes.
- Nematoden aus der Berliner Zoologischen Sammlung, (1899) - Nematodes from the Berlin Zoological Collection.
