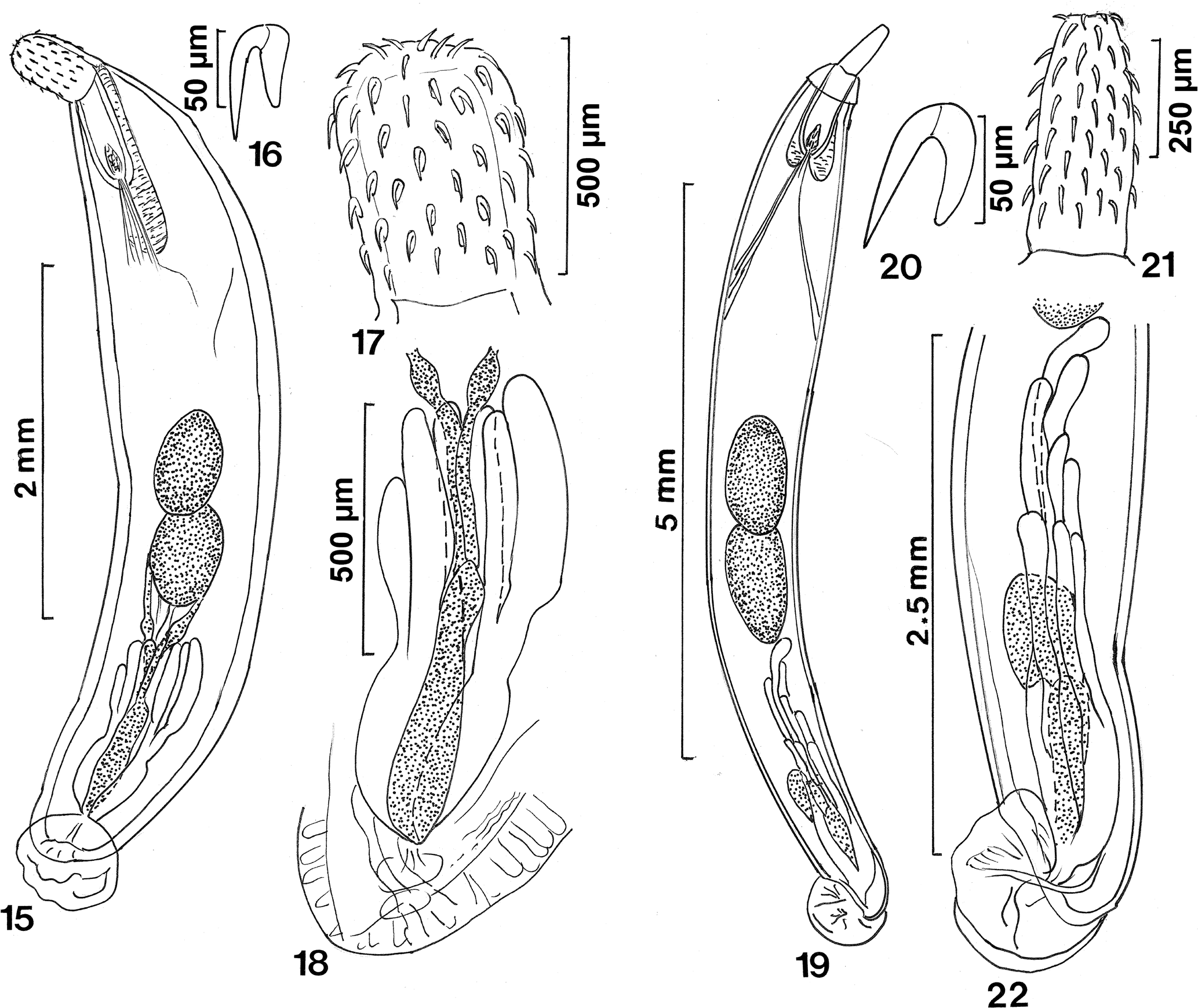
- Acanthocephalus parallelcementglandatus and Pseudoacanthocephalus coniformis Amin, Heckmann & Hà, 2014

Scientific classification
- Kingdom: Animalia
- Phylum: Acanthocephala
- Class: Palaeacanthocephala
- Order: Echinorhynchida
- Family: Echinorhynchidae; Cobbold, 1879

= Echinorhynchidae =

Family of thorny-headed worms

Echinorhynchidae, from Ancient Greek ἐχῖνος (ekhînos), meaning "hedgehog", and ῥύγχος (rhúnkhos), meaning "snout", is a family of acanthocephalan parasitic worms from the order Echinorhynchida. The adult worms live in the intestines of fishes, amphibians and reptiles. The family contains the following genera, organised by subfamily.

- Circinatechinorhynchinae Bhattacharya, 2007
  - Circinatechinorhynchus Bhattacharya, 2007
- Echinorhynchinae Cobbold, 1879
  - Acanthocephalus Koelreuther, 1771
  - Brasacanthus Thatcher, 2001
  - Echinorhynchus Zoega in Müller, 1776
  - Frilloechinorhynchus Bhattacharya, 2007
  - Solearhynchus de Buron & Maillard, 1985
- Incertae sedis
  - Neoacanthocephaloides Cable & Quick, 1954
  - Pseudoacanthocephalus Petrochenko, 1958 - This genus parasitizes amphibians and reptiles globally.
    - Pseudoacanthocephalus goodmani was found infesting Sclerophrys gutturalis, an invasive species on the island of Mauritius.
    - Pseudoacanthocephalus lutzi was found infesting cane toad in the Americas.
    - Pseudoacanthocephalus nickoli was found infesting Sanguirana luzonensis and Hylarana similis on Luzon Island, Philippines.
    - Pseudoacanthocephalus smalesi was found infesting Sphenomorphus abdictus on Luzon Island, Philippines.

In 2019, Kvach & de Buron added to the family a new species, Harpagorhynchus golvaneuzeti, which represents a new genus, Harpagorhynchus and a new subfamily, the Harpagorhynchinae. The specific epithet refers to two famous French parasitologists, Yves-Jean Golvan and Louis Euzet.
