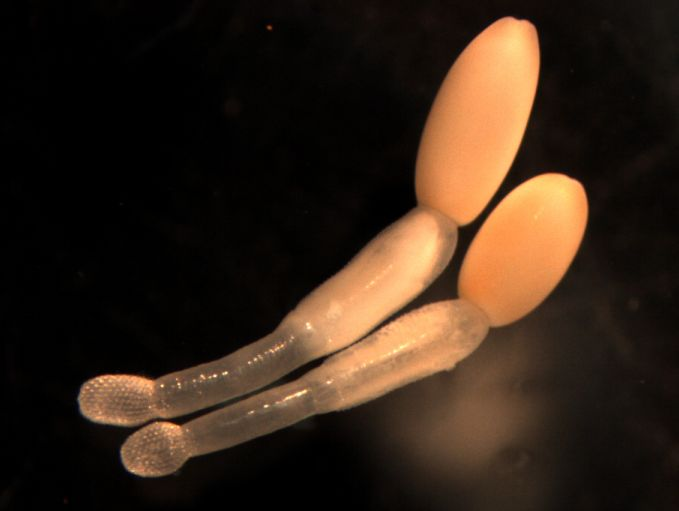
- Profilicollis altmani

Scientific classification
- Domain: Eukaryota
- Kingdom: Animalia
- Phylum: Acanthocephala
- Class: Palaeacanthocephala
- Order: Polymorphida
- Family: Polymorphidae
- Genus: Profilicollis; Meyer, 1931

= Profilicollis =

Genus of thorny-headed worms

Profilicollis is a genus of acanthocephalan parasites of crustaceans. The status of the genus Profilicollis has been debated, and species placed in this genus were formerly included in the genus Polymorphus. However, research on the morphology of the group and their use of hosts has concluded that Profilicollis and Polymorphus should be regarded as distinct genera, and species previously described as Polymorphus altmani are now referred to as Profilicollis altmani in taxonomic and biological literature. Profilicollis parasites infect decapod crustaceans, usually shore crabs, as intermediate hosts, and use many species of shorebirds as definitive (final) hosts.

== Life cycle ==
This parasite first develops in the haemocoel or digestive gland of shore crabs, which are the intermediate host. The species of crabs that are parasitized differs between Profilicollis species. Mole crabs in the genus Emerita are parasitized throughout North and South America by Profilicollis altmani. After infection of the crab, the parasite becomes a dormant cystacanth until the crab is eaten by a suitable bird, such as the surf scoter Melanitta perspicillata or herring gull, Larus argentatus (the final or definitive host). Once the parasite cystacanth has passed through the stomach of the bird, it develops into the adult worm and attaches to the intestines of the bird. Eggs produced by the parasite are released from the bird with bird feces and enter the ocean. Here the eggs are transported by the currents until they are ingested by a filter-feeding mole crab.

The southern sea otter, Enhydra lutris nereis is an accidental host (or paratenic host) of Profilicollis altmani and P. major. Between 1998 and 2001, between 13% and 16.2% of sea otter carcasses found along the coasts of central California were determined to be caused by acanthocephalan peritonitis, or inflammation of the intestines caused by acanthocephalan parasites. This is a large increase in deaths of sea otters due to these parasites; only a few decades ago, the proportion of sea otters dying because of these parasites was almost negligible. Most of the sea otters that were found to be killed by infections by Profilicollis altmani were either young juvenile or older female otters, and it is hypothesized that they feed on sand crabs because they are less skilled at foraging or because of a decrease in their preferred prey.

== Behavioral manipulation ==
Like many other acanthocephalans, recent studies have shown that the presence of cystacanth of Profilicollis antarcticus causes behavioral alterations due to changes in the levels of hemolymph dopamine in its intermediate host, the crab Hemigrapsus crenulatus. These changes in the biogenic amino levels can cause behavioral changes such as changes in response to external stimuli resulting from neurological damages (escape behavior), increased conspicuity resulting from modified pigmentation and/ or behavior and castration. Previous studies have also shown that crabs infected with cystacanths exhibit higher metabolic rates and activity levels than non-parasitized crabs.

The free living conditions of cystacanths in the hemocoelomic cavity of the intermediate host maybe interpreted as the direct way of altering the dopamine metabolic pathway. The alteration of dopamine levels in the hemolymph system implies that there is a generalized effect of the parasite on the body of its intermediate host, rather than an effect on the nerve ganglion level. Therefore, the increase in activity and metabolic rates for this host parasite system could be a consequence of higher metabolic cost of maintenance for the host, linked to the synthesis of monoamines and/ or the physiological consequences of their bio-availability. This altered physiological condition is beneficial for the parasite, considering that their final goal is to increase transmission by increasing the probability of predation on the intermediate host (the crab) by its definitive host (the gull).

== Species ==
- Profilicollis altmani (Perry, 1942) Van Cleave, 1947

Infects mole crabs as intermediate hosts in North and South America. Final hosts include scoters, Melanitta spp.; gulls, Chroicocephalus maculipennis, Leucopheus pipixcan, Larus modestus, and L. dominicanus; lesser scaup, Marilla affnis; sanderling, Calidris alba; dunlin, Calidris alpina; whimbrel, Phaeopus hudsonicus; rhinoceros auklet, Cerorhinca monocerata; and willet, Catoptrophorus semipalmatus. This species was moved to this genus by Van Cleave in 1947.

This species was redescribed in great detail by Amin et al. in 2022 on the basis of specimens from Pacific mole crab Emerita analoga (Hippidae) and Belcher's gull Larus belcheri (Laridae), in Peru.

- Profilicollis antarcticus (Zdzitowiecki, 1985)

Infects shore crabs such as Hemigrapsus crenulatus and gulls such as Larus dominicanus in Chile and New Zealand.

- Profilicollis arcticus (Van Cleave, 1920)
- Profilicollis botulus (Van Cleave, 1916)

Infects shore crabs such as Hemigrapsus oregonensis and the invasive green crab Carcinus maenas as well as the lobster Homarus americanus. Its final hosts are shorebirds such as common goldeneye, Bucephala clangula; Barrow's goldeneye, B. islandica; greater scaup, Aythya marila; eider duck, Somateria mollissima; and long-tailed duck, Clangula hyemalis.

- Profilicollis chasmagnathi (Holcman-Spector, Mane-Garzon and Dei-Cas, 1977)

Infects estuarine crabs (described in Uruguay) and gulls, including Larus atlanticus. The species was moved to this genus by Golvan, 1994.

- Profilicollis formosus Schmidt and Kuntz, 1967

Infects Macrobrachium and domestic ducks in Taiwan.

- Profilicollis major Lundström, 1942

Infects the Atlantic rock crab Cancer irroratus, although likely other species as well. This parasite has also found in the intestines of sea otters, although it appears to be much less pathogenic to the otters than Profilicollis altmani.

- Profilicollis novaezelandensis (Brockerhoff, 2002)

Infects shore crabs such as Hemigrapsus crenulatus, and mud crabs Macrophthalmus hirtipes and Helice crassa. They then infect birds such as the South Island pied oystercatcher Haematopus ostralegus finschi and bar-tailed godwit Limosa lapponica in New Zealand.

- Profilicollis rancoensis
- Profilicollis sphaerocephalus (Bremser, 1819)

Infects many grapsid crabs (including Brachynotus spinosus, Cyclograpsus granulosus, Paragrapsus gaimardii, Paragrapsus laevis and Paragrapsus quadridentatus) 1 species of portunid crab (Nectocarcinus integrifrons). This species also infects gulls.

== Proposed synonyms ==
- Profilicollis kenti and Profilicollis texensis were described as parasitizing mole crabs in North America, in addition to the species Profilicollis altmani. Morphological examination first suggested that Profilicollis kenti and Profilicollis texensis were synonyms of Profilicollis altmani. Later, DNA sequencing of acanthocephalans sampled form the mole crab Emerita analoga in the Pacific and E. talpoida in the Atlantic showed that only one species of acanthocephalan was present in Emerita crabs in North America.
- Profilicollis bullocki was reported as parasitizing the mole crabs in Chile and Peru. DNA sequences were used to test whether the species Profilicollis bullocki in South America was genetically distinct from Profilicollis altmani in North America. The parasites from the mole crab Emerita analoga in Chile and E. rathbunae in Panama were found to be highly similar to the acanthocephalans from mole crabs in North America, strongly suggesting they are the same species. Later research showed that acanthocephalan parasites from the Atlantic coast of South America (Uruguay) are also genetically similar, and belong to the same species.
