= Filicollis =

Scientific classification
- Domain: Eukaryota
- Kingdom: Animalia
- Phylum: Rotifera
- Class: Palaeacanthocephala
- Order: Polymorphida
- Family: Polymorphidae
- Genus: Filicollis; Lühe, 1911

Genus of worms

Filicollis is a genus of parasitic worms belonging to the family Polymorphidae.

The species of this genus are found in Europe and Northern America.

Species:

- Filicollis anatis (Schrank, 1788)
- Filicollis trophimenkoi Atrashkevich, 1982
