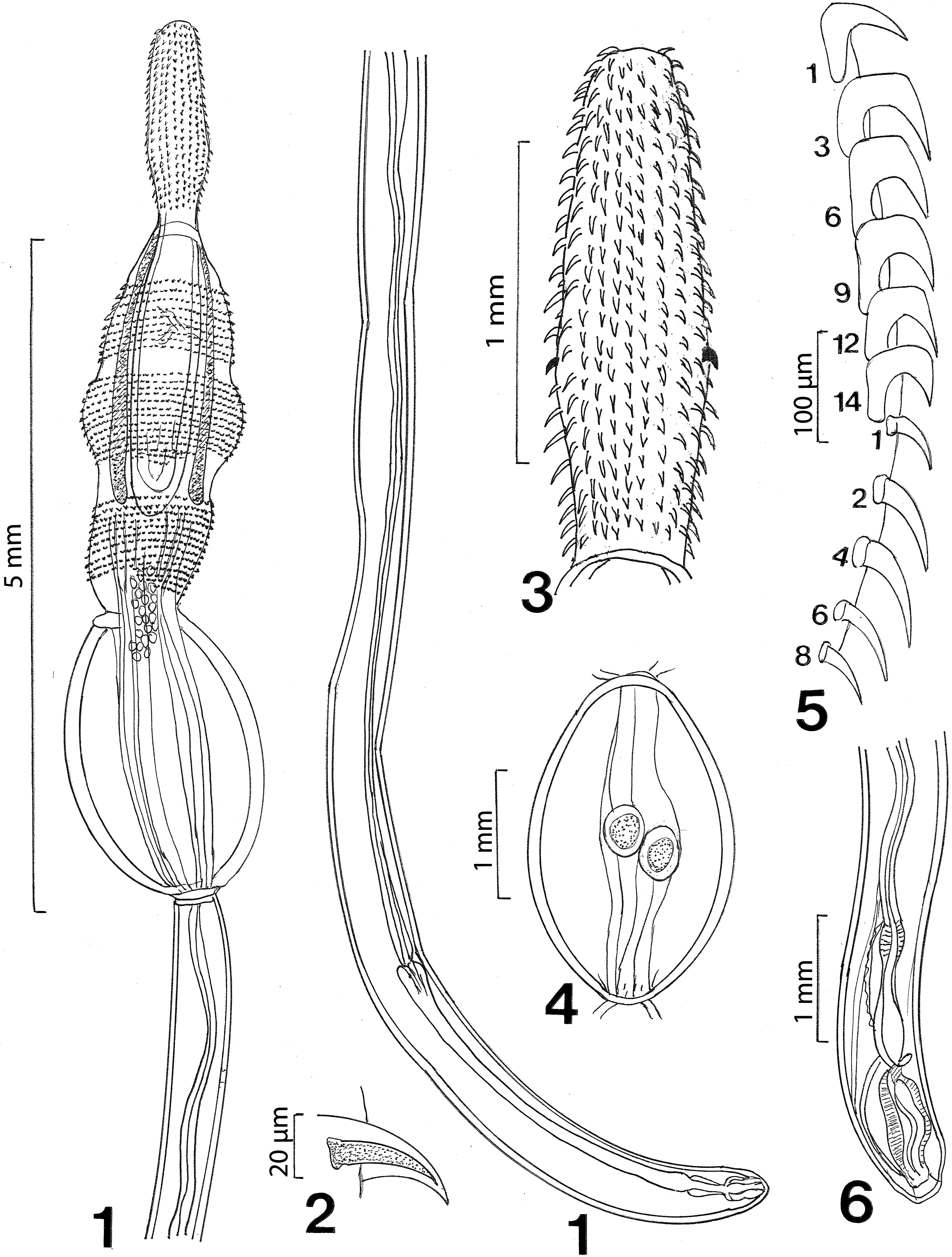
- Neoandracantha peruensis

Scientific classification
- Kingdom: Animalia
- Phylum: Acanthocephala
- Class: Palaeacanthocephala
- Order: Polymorphida
- Family: Polymorphidae
- Genus: Neoandracantha; Amin & Heckmann, 2017
- Species: N. peruensis

Binomial name
- Neoandracantha peruensis Amin & Heckmann, 2017

= Neoandracantha =

Genus of thorny-headed worms

Neoandracantha is a monotypic genus of acanthocephalans (thorny-headed or spiny-headed parasitic worms) containing a single species, Neoandracantha peruensis. The genus was created in 2017 by Amin & Heckmann for the single species Neoandracantha peruensis.

== Taxonomy ==
The genus was created in 2017 by Amin & Heckmann described from cystacanths. While it is uncommon to describe acanthocephalan taxa from immature stages, Amin & Heckmann claimed that the presence of clear-cut distinguishing features separating the present material from its nearest congeneric taxa, and the absence of adults, justified the erection of the new species N. peruensis.

The National Center for Biotechnology Information does not indicate that any phylogenetic analysis has been published on xx that would confirm its position as a unique genus in the family [[]]. The genus was instead differentiated from the closely related genus Andracantha morphologically because members of Andracantha have anteriorly enlarged pear-shaped Corynosoma-like trunks, only two fields of anterior trunk spines with occasional genital spines, and bilateral or tandem testes, and because proboscides of species of Andracantha have considerably fewer hooks that gradually decrease in size posteriorly.

== Description ==
Specimens of N. peruensis have a slender trunk with two anterior swellings, 3 separate fields of spines on the foretrunk swelling, and no genital spines on the hindtrunk. The proboscis is heavily armored with 21–22 longitudinal rows of 22 hooks each. Hook no. 14 is more robust ventrally than dorsally. Cystacanths of N. peruensis also have a long tubular hindtrunk and the males have diagonal testes in the midtrunk swelling.

== Distribution ==
The distribution of N. peruensis is determined by that of its hosts. The sample of N. peruensis was collected from the painted ghost crab (Ocypode gaudichaudii) which was collected from the Pacific coast of Peru.

== Hosts ==
Life cycle of Acanthocephala. (Note: There are no known aberrant human infections for N. peruensis species.)

The life cycle of an acanthocephalan consists of three stages beginning when an infective acanthor (development of an egg) is released from the intestines of the definitive host and then ingested by an arthropod, in this case, a painted ghost crab, the intermediate host. When the acanthor molts, the second stage called the acanthella begins. This stage involves penetrating the wall of the mesenteron or the intestine of the intermediate host and growing. The final stage is the infective cystacanth which is the larval or juvenile state of an Acanthocephalan, differing from the adult only in size and stage of sexual development. The cystacanths within the intermediate hosts are consumed by the definitive host, usually attaching to the walls of the intestines, and as adults they reproduce sexually in the intestines. The acanthor is passed in the feces of the definitive host and the cycle repeats. There may be paratenic hosts (hosts where parasites infest but do not undergo larval development or sexual reproduction) for Neoandracantha.

Neoandracantha peruensis parasitizes an unknown animal. There are no reported cases of N. peruensis infesting humans in the English language medical literature.

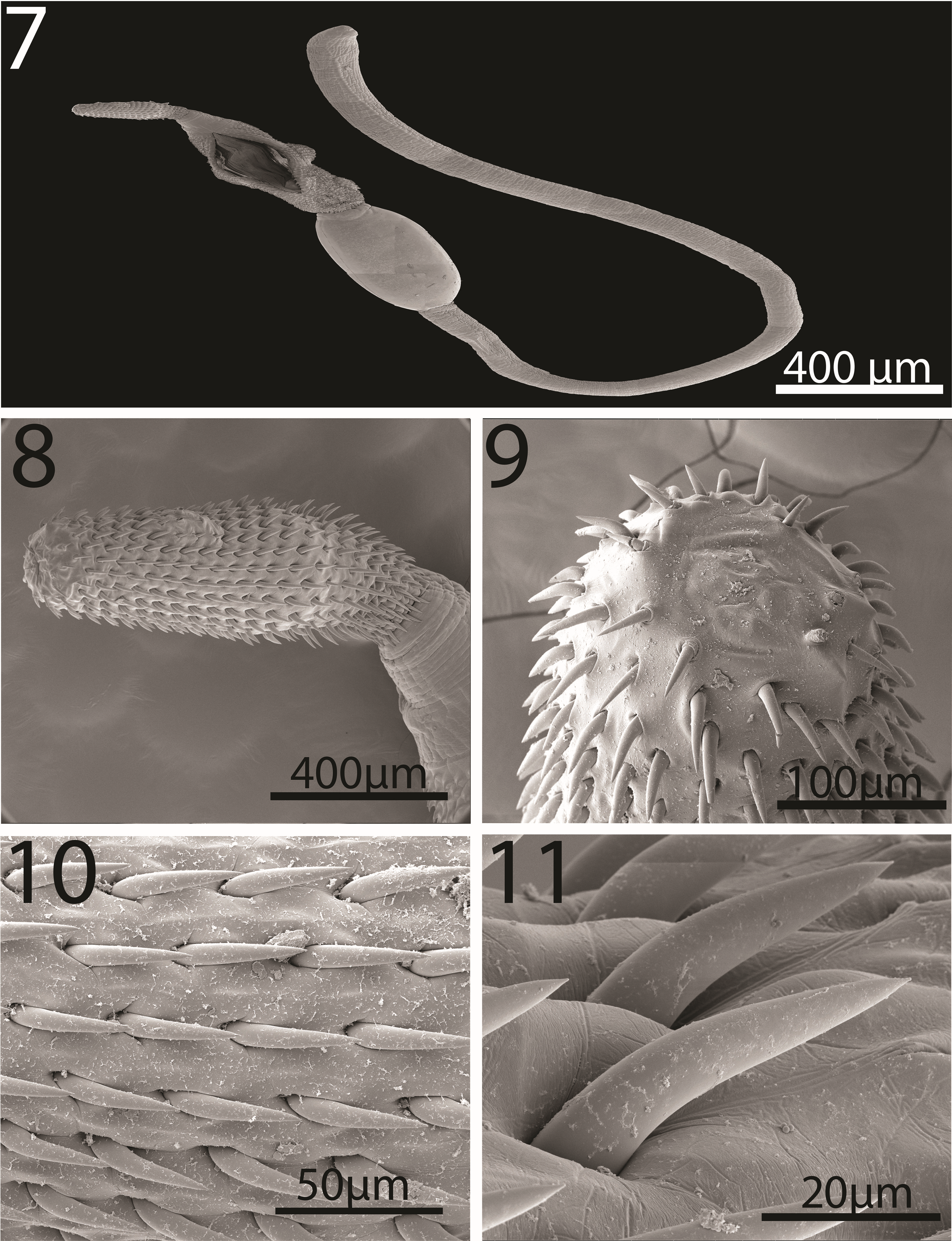
Scanning electron microscopy of Neoandracantha peruensis

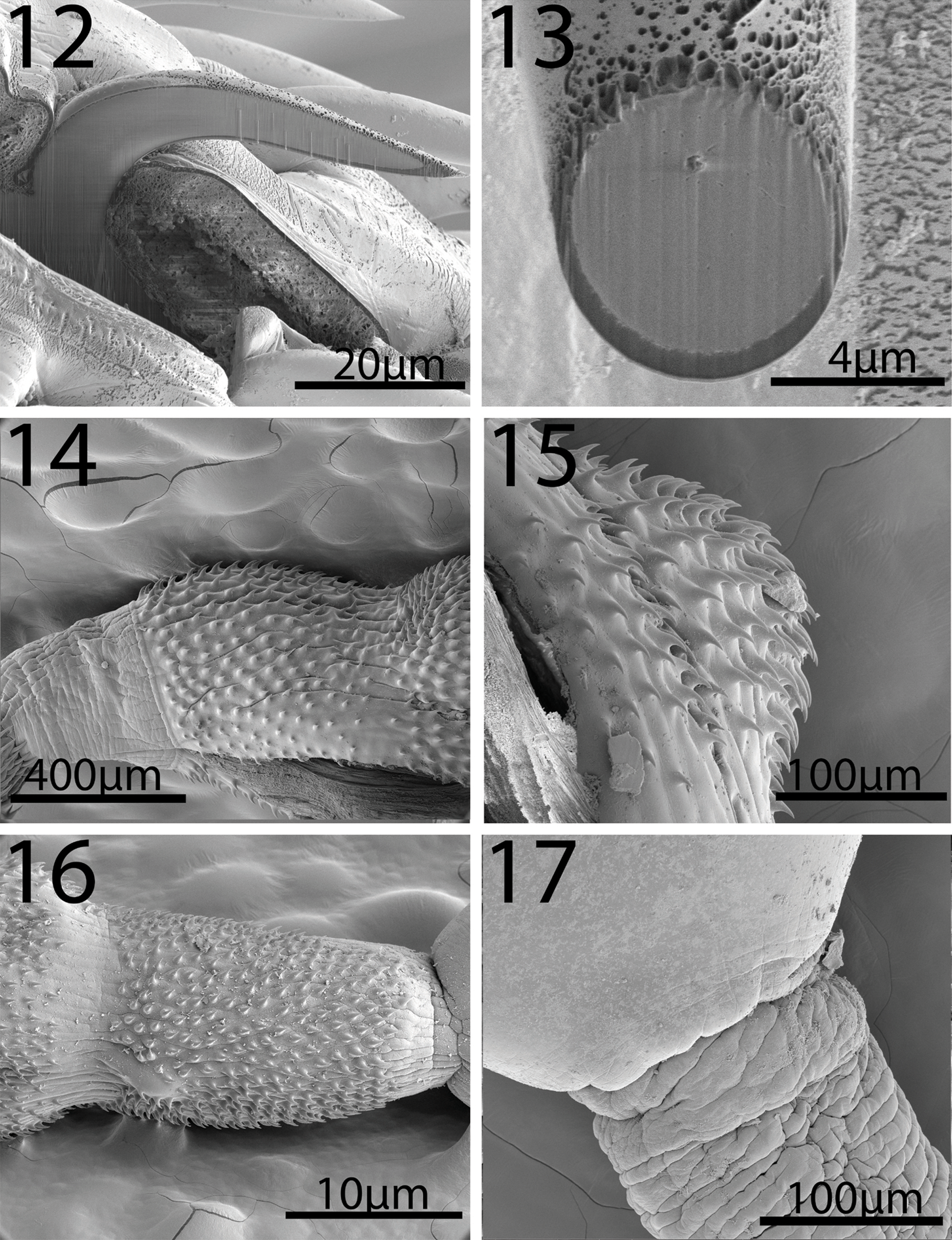
Scanning electron microscopy of Neoandracantha peruensis

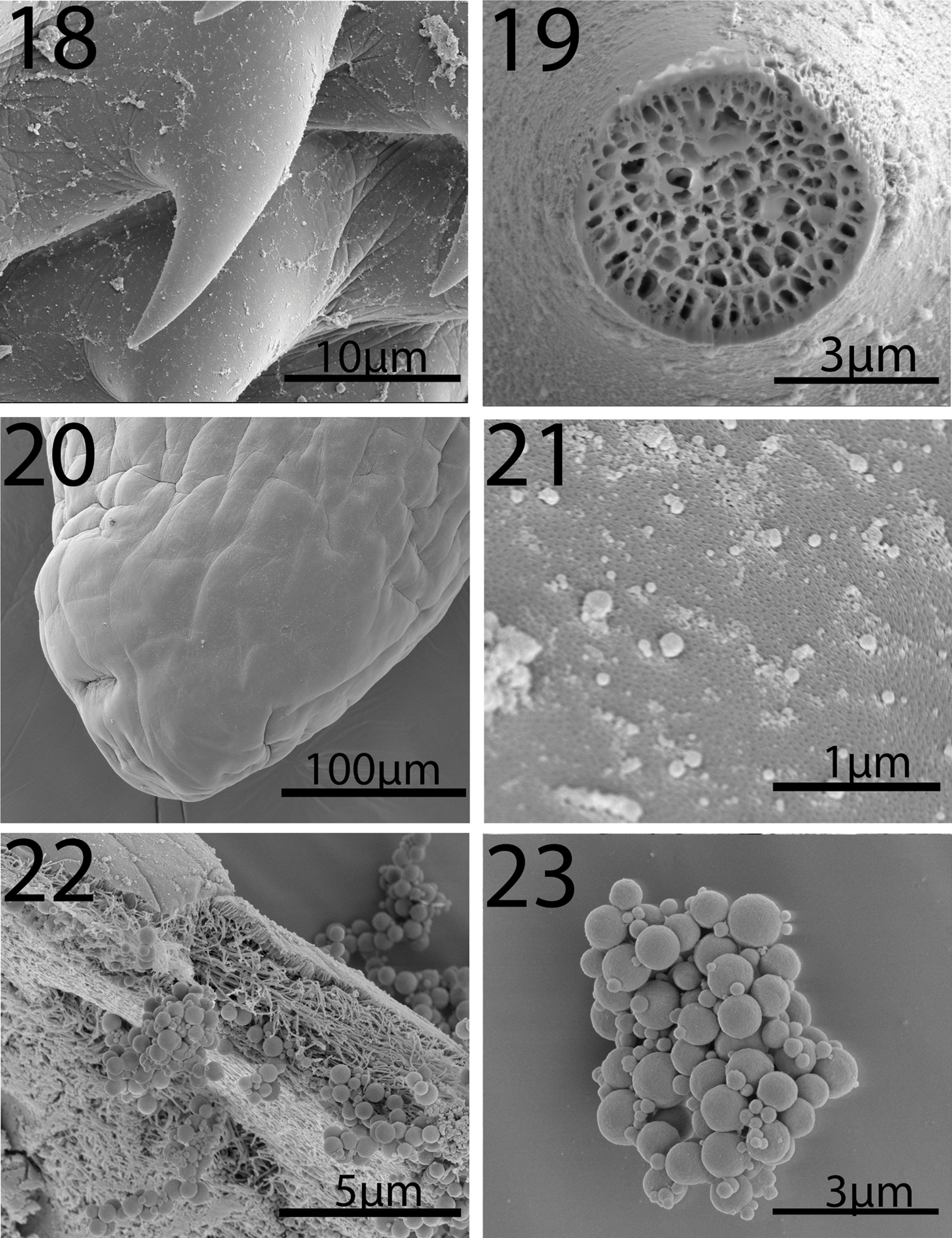
Scanning electron microscopy of Neoandracantha peruensis
