= Filicollis anatis =

Scientific classification
- Domain: Eukaryota
- Kingdom: Animalia
- Phylum: Rotifera
- Class: Palaeacanthocephala
- Order: Polymorphida
- Family: Polymorphidae
- Genus: Filicollis
- Species: F. anatis

Binomial name
- Filicollis anatis (Schrank, 1788)

Synonyms
- Echinorhynchus anatis Schrank, 1788; Echinorhynchus filicollis Rudolphi, 1809; Echinorhynchus laevis von Linstow, 1905; Echinorhynchus polymorphus Bremser, 1824

Species of thorny-headed worm

Filicollis anatis is an endoparasite in the Polymorphidae family of thorny-headed worms. Adults have been found to occur in waterbirds such as ducks, where they cause a condition known as filicollosis. Larval stages occur in invertebrate hosts such as crayfish.

A study in the Chernihiv region of Ukraine found that F. anatis infected ducks throughout their grazing period, but not in the winter; it also found that the parasite's eggs could remain viable throughout the winter when buried in mud under natural conditions.

Acanthocephalans such as F. anatis form capsules in their intermediate arthropod hosts to protect the developing larvae from the host immune system. F. anatis forms its capsules primarily by secreting material during the initial (acanthellar) stage after infecting the intermediate host.
