= Polymorphus =

Scientific classification
- Kingdom: Animalia
- Phylum: Acanthocephala
- Class: Palaeacanthocephala
- Order: Polymorphida
- Family: Polymorphidae
- Genus: Polymorphus; Lühe, 1911

Synonyms
- Hexaglandula Petrochenko, 1950

Genus of worms

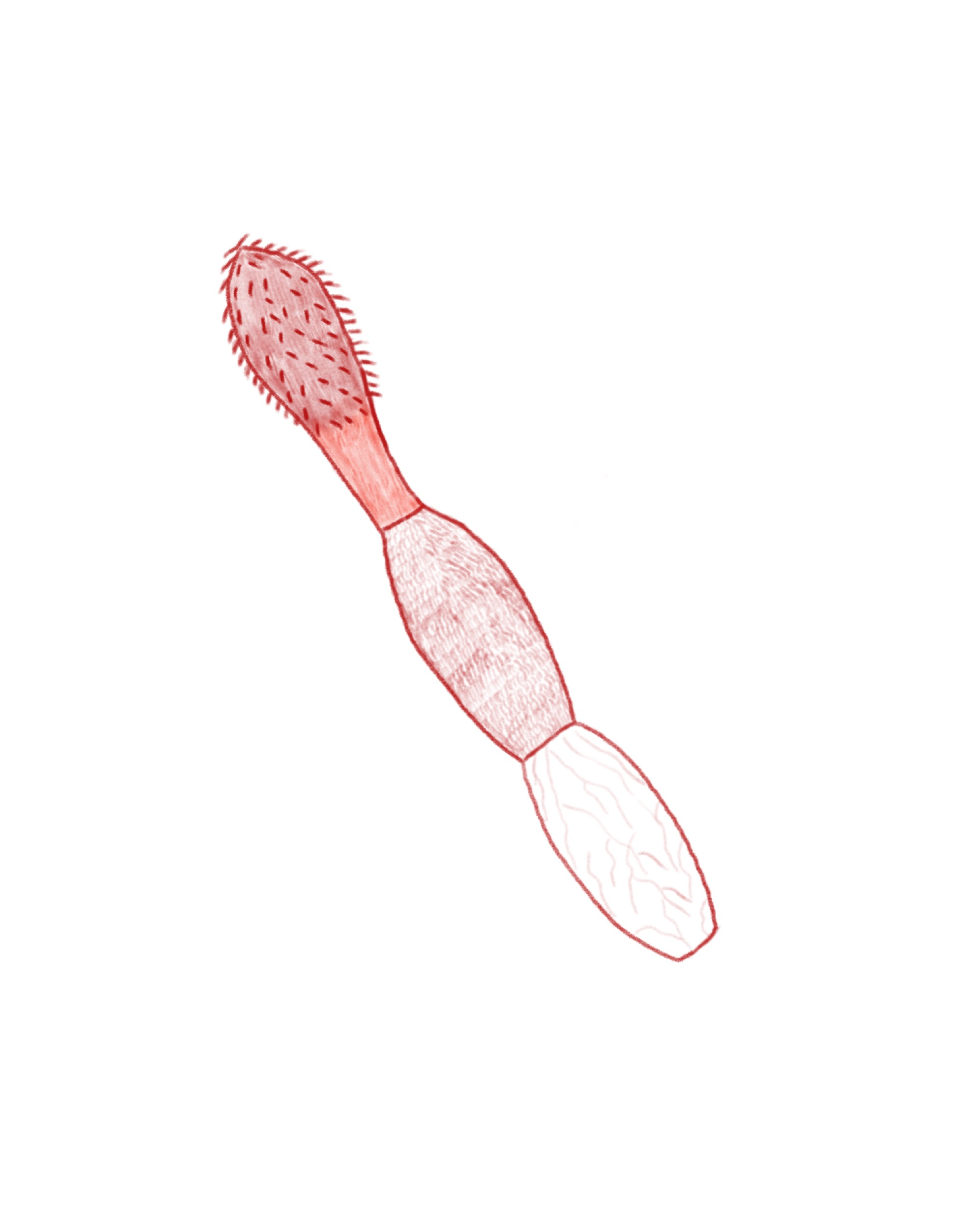
Red pigment depiction of the Polymorphus

Polymorphus is a genus of obligate endoparasitic worms that belongs to the phylum Acanthocephala. There are currently 36 extant species within the genus Polymorphus characterized by their endoparasitic lifestyle, and red colouration 3.

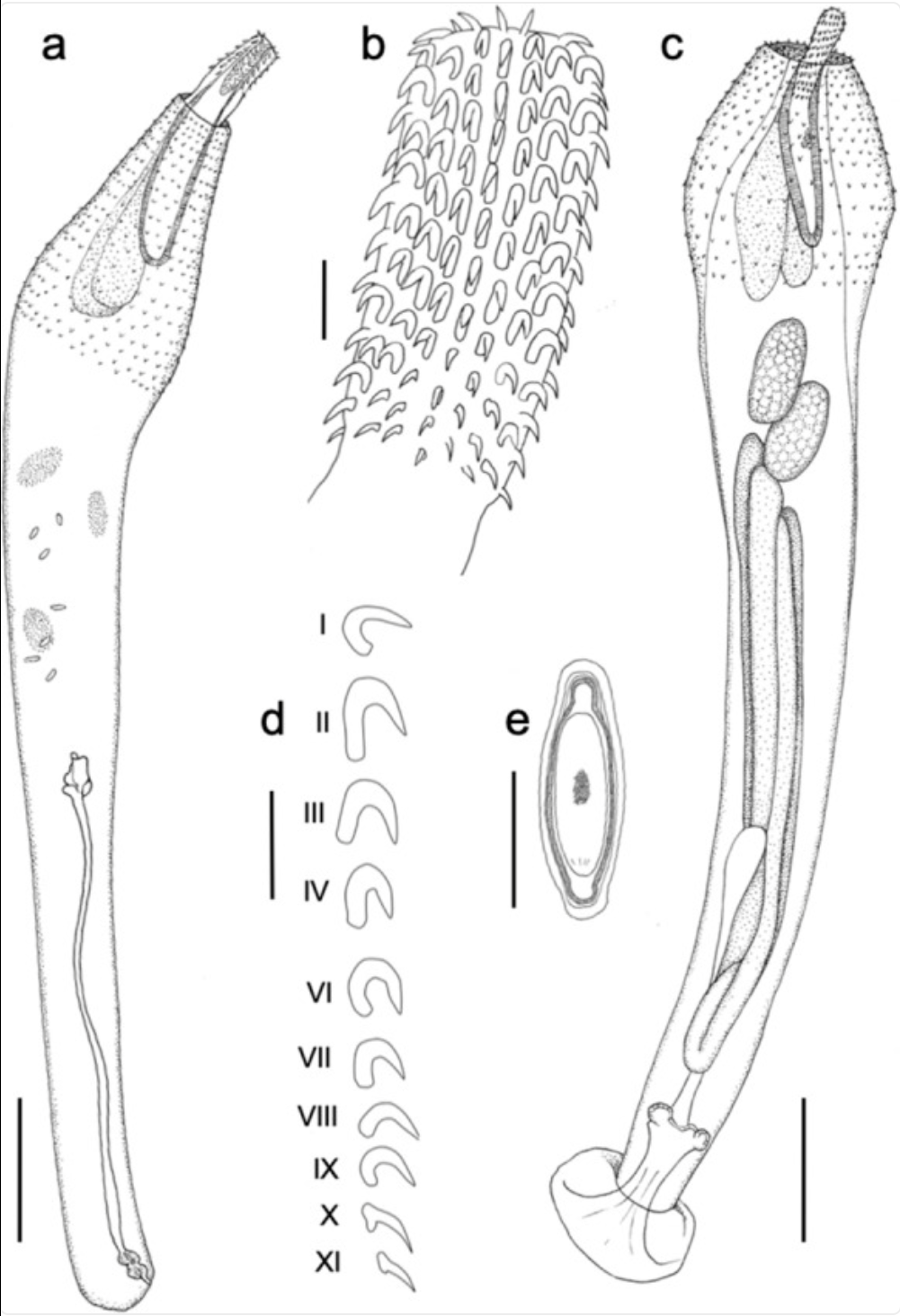
Polymorphus

== Species ==
- Polymorphus actuganensis Petrochenko, 1949
- Polymorphus acutis Van Cleave and Starrett, 1940
- Polymorphus arctocephali Smales, 1986
- Polymorphus ariusis (Bilqees, 1971)
- Polymorphus biziurae Johnston and Edmonds, 1948
- Polymorphus boschadis (Schrank, 1788)
- Polymorphus brevis (Van Cleave, 1916)
- Polymorphus chongqingensis Liu, Zhang and Zhang, 1990
- Polymorphus cincli Belopolskaya, 1959
- Polymorphus contortus (Bremser in Westrumb, 1821)
- Polymorphus corynoides Skrjabin, 1913
- Polymorphus corynosoma Travassos, 1915
- Polymorphus crassus Van Cleave, 1924
- Polymorphus cucullatus Van Cleave and Starrett, 1940
- Polymorphus diploinflatus Lundström, 1942
- Polymorphus fatimaae Khan, Dharejo, Birmani and Bilqees, 2008
- Polymorphus fulicai Birmani, Dharejo and Khan, 2011
- Polymorphus gavii Hokhlova, 1965
- Polymorphus inermis Travassos, 1923
- Polymorphus karachiensis (Bilqees, 1971)
- Polymorphus kostylewi Petrochenko, 1949
- Polymorphus magnus Skrjabin, 1913
- Polymorphus marchii (Porta, 1910)
- Polymorphus marilis Van Cleave, 1939
- Polymorphus mathevossianae Petrochenko, 1949
- Polymorphus meyeri Lundström, 1942
- Polymorphus miniatus (von Linstow, 1896)
- Polymorphus minutus (Goeze, 1782)
- Polymorphus mohiuddini Muti-ur-Rahman, Khan, Bilqees and Khatoon, 2008
- Polymorphus mutabilis (Rudolphi, 1819)
- Polymorphus nickoli Khan and Bilqees, 1998
- Polymorphus obtusus Van Cleave, 1918
- Polymorphus paradoxus Connell and Corner, 1957
- Polymorphus paucihamatus Heinze, 1936
- Polymorphus phippsi Kostylew, 1922
- Polymorphus piriformis (Bremser in Rudolphi, 1819)
- Polymorphus pupa (von Linstow, 1905)
- Polymorphus sichuanensis Wang and Zhang, 1987
- Polymorphus sindensis Khan, Ghazi and Bilqees, 2002
- Polymorphus spindlatus Amin and Heckmann, 1991
- Polymorphus striatus (Goeze, 1782)
- Polymorphus strumosoides Lundström, 1942
- Polymorphus swartzi Schmidt, 1965
- Polymorphus trochus Van Cleave, 1945

== Morphology ==
A distinguishing feature of Polymorphus species is their vivid red to orange pigmentation, which becomes particularly pronounced within transparent intermediate hosts, such as amphipod crustaceans 5. This conspicuous coloration enhances the visibility of infected hosts to predatory definitive hosts, thereby increasing the efficiency of trophic transmission 5. The pigmentation arises from the parasite's unique ability to sequester carotenoids from its amphipod hosts, resulting in the characteristic reddish coloration of the organism 5.

=== General morphological features ===
- Proboscis: The proboscis is a defining structure, armed with 20 to 22 longitudinal rows of 11 to 13 hooks per row, enabling firm attachment to the intestinal wall of the definitive host 4.
- Trunk: The body is cylindrical, with anterior expansions. The fore-trunk bears spines, and the neck region is conical in shape 4.
- Internal anatomy includes a prominent ganglion, clavate (club-shaped) lemnisci, and simple roots anchoring the proboscis apparatus 4.

=== Sexual dimorphism and reproductive morphology ===
==== Males ====
- Possess well-developed testes 4.
- The posterior extremity is dramatically rounded, terminating in a terminal genital pore 4.
- A distinctive copulatory bursa is present, characterized by numerous sensory pits. The length of the bursa is variable and depends on the degree of eversion, playing a crucial role in reproductive behaviour 4.

==== Females ====
- The reproductive system features a vaginal complex, ovarian balls, and developing eggs 4.
- Eggs are elongated with a polar prolongation of the middle membrane, a taxonomically significant trait within the genus 4.

== Endoparasitic lifestyle ==
Worms within the genus Polymorphus are well known for their obligate endoparasitic lifestyle, particularly their ability to manipulate intermediate hosts 1. Polymorphus species utilize invertebrates, including amphipods and decapods, as intermediate hosts and vertebrates such as waterfowl and fish-eating birds as their final hosts. An example of this interaction is the relationship between Polymorphus paradoxus and its intermediate host, Gammarus lacustris. These parasites manipulate G. lacustris by modifying its behavior, causing the amphipod to be drawn to light and swim toward the surface 3. Such manipulation ultimately enhances the likelihood that P. paradoxus will be consumed by the parasite's final host. Additionally, Polymorphus species exhibit the ability to steal carotenoids from their amphipod hosts, leading to the characteristic red colouration of the organism 3. By leaching carotenoids from G. lacustris, this causes the amphipod to appear blue opposed to brown, which once again increases the probability of being detected by waterfowl or fish-eating birds.

== Previous names ==
Polymorphus used to be called by many names such as: Profilicollis Meyer, 1931, Falsifilicollis Webster, 1948, Parafilicollis Petrochenko, 1956, Subfilicollis Hoklova, 1967, Subcorynosoma Hoklova, 1967, Arhythmorhynchus Lühe, 1911, Hexaglandula Petrochenko, 1950 or as subgenera (Profilicollis, Hexaglandula).
