= Polymorphus actuganensis =

Scientific classification
- Domain: Eukaryota
- Kingdom: Animalia
- Phylum: Rotifera
- Class: Palaeacanthocephala
- Order: Polymorphida
- Family: Polymorphidae
- Genus: Polymorphus
- Species: P. actuganensis

Binomial name
- Polymorphus actuganensis Petrochenko, 1949

Species of worm

Polymorphus actuganensis is a parasitic worm found in Eurasia. Its proboscis has 18 rows of 8 hooks.
