= Andracantha =

Scientific classification
- Kingdom: Animalia
- Phylum: Acanthocephala
- Class: Palaeacanthocephala
- Order: Polymorphida
- Family: Polymorphidae
- Genus: Andracantha; Schmidt, 1975

Genus of worms

Andracantha is a genus of parasitic worms belonging to the family Polymorphidae.

The species of this genus are found in Northern America.

== Species ==
There are nine species in the genus Andracantha. (Note: A binomial authority in parentheses indicates that the species was originally described in a genus other than the present genus.)

- Andracantha baylisi (Zdzitowiecki, 1986)
- Andracantha clavata (Goss, 1941)
- Andracantha gravida (Alegret, 1941)
- Andracantha leucocarboi Presswell, García-Varela & Smales, 2017
- Andracantha mergi (Lundström, 1941)
- Andracantha phalacrocoracis (Yamaguti, 1939)
- Andracantha sigma Presswell, García-Varela & Smales, 2017
- Andracantha tandemtesticulata Monteiro, Amato & Amato, 2006
- Andracantha tunitae (Weiss, 1914)
