= Diplospinifer =

Scientific classification
- Domain: Eukaryota
- Kingdom: Animalia
- Phylum: Acanthocephala
- Class: Palaeacanthocephala
- Order: Polymorphida
- Family: Polymorphidae
- Genus: Diplospinifer; Fukui, 1929

Genus of thorny-headed worms

Diplospinifer is a genus of worms belonging to the family Polymorphidae.

Species:

- Diplospinifer serpenticola Fukui, 1929
