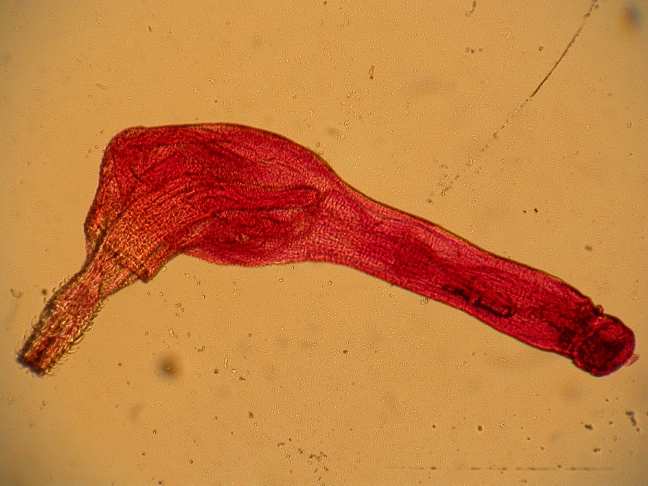
- Corynosoma wegeneri

Scientific classification
- Domain: Eukaryota
- Kingdom: Animalia
- Phylum: Rotifera
- Class: Palaeacanthocephala
- Order: Polymorphida
- Family: Polymorphidae
- Genus: Corynosoma; Lühe, 1904

= Corynosoma =

Genus of worms

Corynosoma is a genus of parasitic worms belonging to the family Polymorphidae.

The genus has almost cosmopolitan distribution.

Species:

- Corynosoma alaskensis Golvan, 1959
- Corynosoma australe Johnston, 1937
- Corynosoma beaglense Laskowski, Jezewski & Zdzitowiecki, 2008
- Corynosoma bullosum (Linstow, 1892)
- Corynosoma cameroni Van Cleave, 1953
- Corynosoma caspicum Golvan & Mokhayer, 1973
- Corynosoma cetaceum Johnston & Best, 1942
- Corynosoma curilense Gubanov, 1952
- Corynosoma enhydri Morozov, 1940
- Corynosoma erignathi Stryukov, 2000
- Corynosoma evae Zdzitowiecki, 1984
- Corynosoma falcatum Van Cleave, 1953
- Corynosoma gibsoni Zdzitowiecki, 1986
- Corynosoma hamanni (Linstow, 1892)
- Corynosoma hannae Zdzitowiecki, 1984
- Corynosoma magdaleni Montreuil, 1958
- Corynosoma pseudohamanni Zdzitowiecki, 1984
- Corynosoma rauschi Golvan, 1959
- Corynosoma reductum (Linstow, 1905)
- Corynosoma semerme (Forssell, 1904)
- Corynosoma septentrionale Treshchev, 1966
- Corynosoma shackletoni Zdzitowiecki, 1978
- Corynosoma simile Neiland, 1962
- Corynosoma stanleyi Smales, 1986
- Corynosoma strumosum (Rudolphi, 1802)
- Corynosoma validum Van Cleave, 1953
- Corynosoma ventronudum Skrjabin, 1959
- Corynosoma villosum Van Cleave, 1953
- Corynosoma wegeneri Heinze, 1934
