= Polymorphus fatimaae =

Scientific classification
- Domain: Eukaryota
- Kingdom: Animalia
- Phylum: Rotifera
- Class: Palaeacanthocephala
- Order: Polymorphida
- Family: Polymorphidae
- Genus: Polymorphus
- Species: P. fatimaae

Binomial name
- Polymorphus fatimaae Khan, Dharejo, Birmani and Bilqees, 2008

Species of parasitic worm

Polymorphus fatimaae is a species of Acanthocephala in the family Polymorphidae. It was first described in 2008. It can be found in Hyderabad, Sindh.
