= Profilicollis major =

Scientific classification
- Domain: Eukaryota
- Kingdom: Animalia
- Phylum: Acanthocephala
- Class: Palaeacanthocephala
- Order: Polymorphida
- Family: Polymorphidae
- Genus: Profilicollis
- Species: P. major

Binomial name
- Profilicollis major Lundström, 1942

Synonyms
- Falsifilicollis major (Lundström, 1942) Yamaguti, 1963; Filicollis major Lundström, 1942; Polymorphus major Lundström, 1942

Species of acanthocephalan parasite

Profilicollis major is a species of acanthocephalan parasites of crustaceans in the genus Profilicollis. It infects the Atlantic rock crab Cancer irroratu.
