= Polymorphus minutus =

Scientific classification
- Kingdom: Animalia
- Phylum: Acanthocephala
- Class: Palaeacanthocephala
- Order: Polymorphida
- Family: Polymorphidae
- Genus: Polymorphus
- Species: P. minutus

Binomial name
- Polymorphus minutus Goeze, 1782

Species of parasitic worm

Polymorphus minutus is a species of acanthocephalan in the family Polymorphidae. They can grow up to 12.5 mm. It is an economically significant parasite in goose and duck farming.
