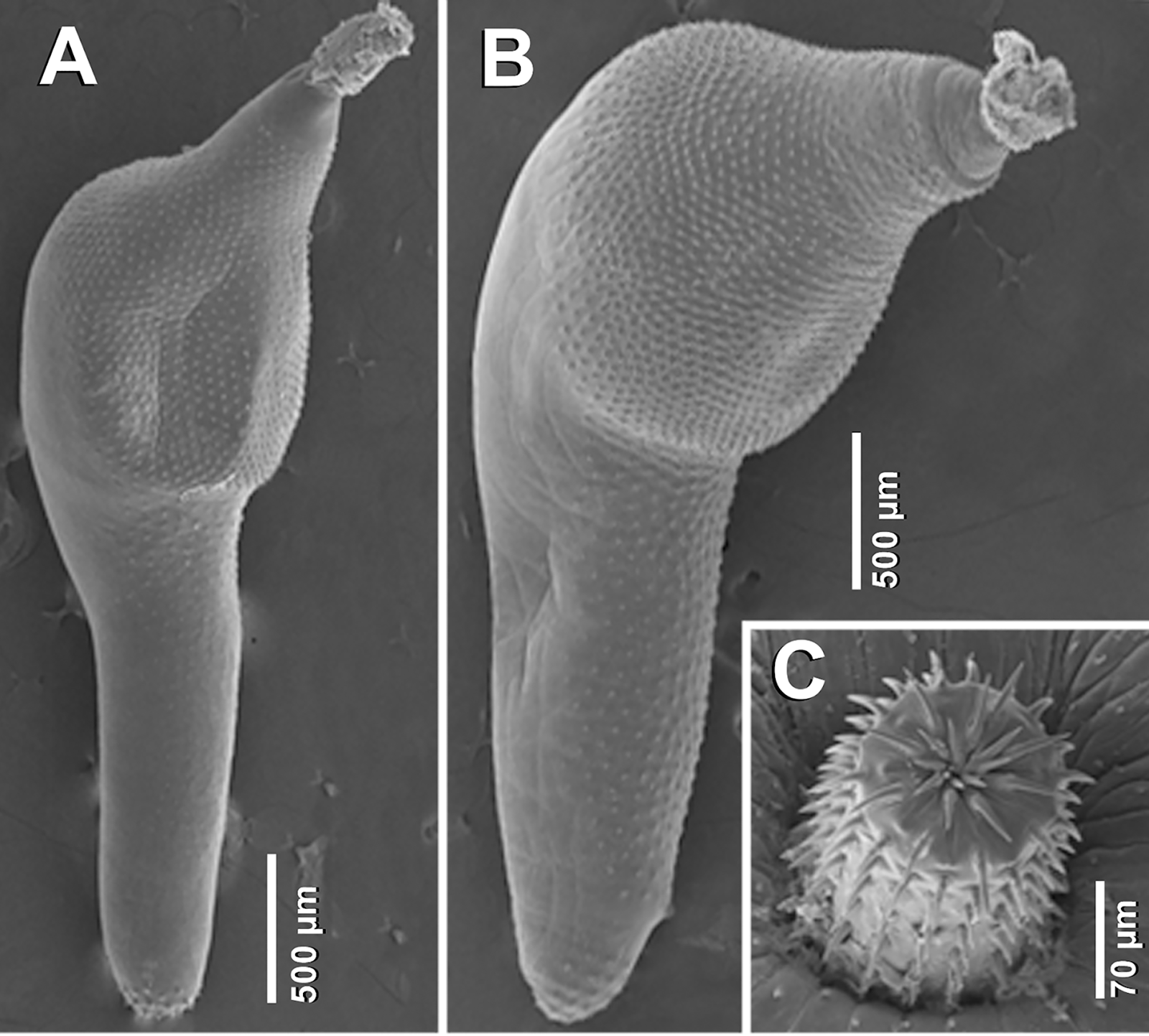

Scientific classification
- Kingdom: Animalia
- Phylum: Acanthocephala
- Class: Palaeacanthocephala
- Order: Polymorphida
- Family: Polymorphidae
- Genus: Corynosoma
- Species: C. australe

Binomial name
- Corynosoma australe Johnston, 1937

= Corynosoma australe =

Species of thorny-headed worm

Corynosoma autrale is a species of acanthocephalan (also known as thorny-headed worms, or spiny headed worms). This species usually infects pinnipeds; the semi-aquatic fin-footed marine mammals most commonly known as seals and sea lions. Pinniped infections are not exclusive, recently C. australe has been discovered in Magellanic penguins (Spheniscus magellanicus).

== Life cycle ==
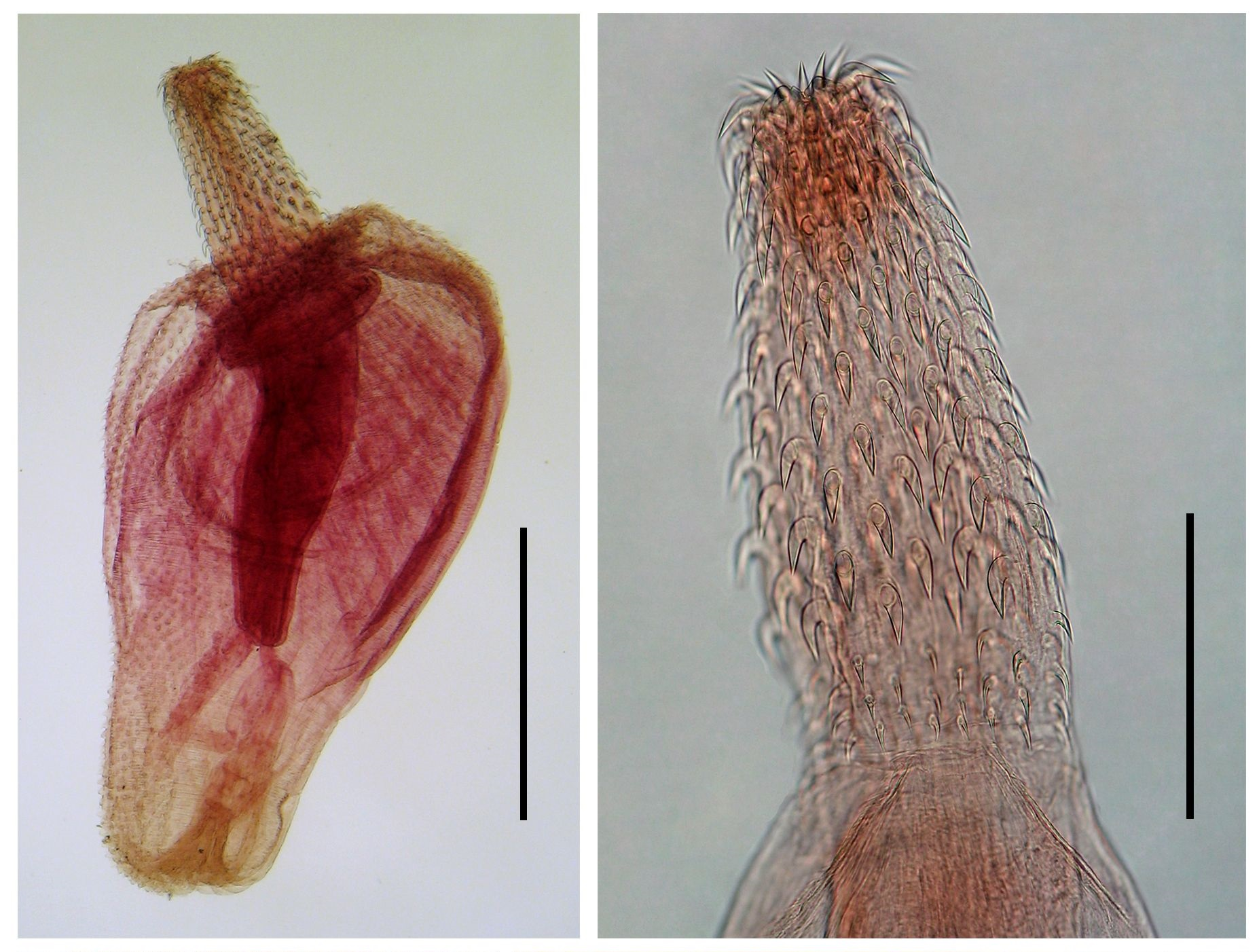
A juvenile female Corynosoma australe with a detail of the proboscis. Bar on the left is 1mm and the bar on the right is 0.25mm.

This species follows a biological life cycle similar to many other of the same phylum. Starting with eggs being released in the feces of the host from a mature female, the eggs are then ingested by an arthropod, the parasite's first intermediate host. Typically for C. australe the first host is an amphipod, a relatively small (usually less than 10 millimeters) shrimp-like crustacean. Within the crustacean a spindle-shaped embryo is released from the eggs and then subsequently develops into an acanthella, the juvenile infective form of an acanthocephalan. The acanthella then moves into the body cavity via the gut wall, encysts within and begins developing into the infective form known as a cystacanth. When the first intermediate host is consumed, either by its definitive host or by a paratenic host, the parasitic worm is released. Once within the definitive host, the cystacanth becomes an adult, encysts, then pierces the gut wall after its proboscis has been everted. Once through the gut wall it sexually matures by developing its sexual organs after feeding. After sexual maturation, the adult worms mate, the embryos develop within the female and the life cycle repeats. In contrast, within a paratenic host like a fish, the parasitic worm just forms a cyst.

== Magellanic penguin infection ==
Fish serve as a paratenic host to the Corynosoma australe parasite given that their infection by the parasitic worm is not necessary for the success of the parasite's life cycle. Nonetheless, paratenic hosts such as fish are still important because they allow the parasite access to a variety of hosts given many animals eat fish as their primary food source, in this case Magellanic penguins. Since penguins typically consume the same food as seals and sea lions it became apparent how penguins acquire a parasitic infection endemic to pinnipeds. Likewise, since seals and sea lions share a comparable physiological similarity with penguins, cross species infection is more than possible. Though, C. australe can only produce viable eggs from within the pinniped host. C. australe can survive perfectly well within the penguins as its host, with female worms growing bigger within the guts of Magellanic penguins. In addition, though C. australe can survive well within Magellanic penguins, egg viability is lessened within this non-native host. Likewise, the sex ratio of the parasitic worm is highly skewed toward females within the gut of the penguins as the host. Though Magellanic penguins are not the definitive host of C. australe, they serve well as a suitable candidate.
