= Heptamegacanthus =

Scientific classification
- Kingdom: Animalia
- Phylum: Acanthocephala
- Class: Archiacanthocephala
- Order: Oligacanthorhynchida
- Family: Oligacanthorhynchidae
- Genus: Heptamegacanthus; Spencer-Jones, 1990
- Species: H. niekerki

Binomial name
- Heptamegacanthus niekerki Spencer-Jones, 1990
- The type locality for H. niekerki is Nqadu Forest, Transkei, South Africa.

Genus of parasitic worms

Heptamegacanthus is a genus of acanthocephalans (thorny-headed or spiny-headed parasitic worms) containing a single species, Heptamegacanthus niekerki, that is a parasite of the endangered giant golden mole. It is found only in isolated forests in the Transkei and near East London, both in South Africa. The worms are about 4 mm long and 2 mm wide with minimal sexual dimorphism. An individual's body consists of a short, wide trunk and a tubular feeding and sucking organ called the proboscis which is covered with hooks. The hooks are used to pierce and hold the rectal wall of its host. There are 40 to 45 of these hooks arranged in rings surrounding the proboscis. They are not radially symmetrical. There are seven large anterior hooks; the hooks in the anterior ring are twice as large as those in the second ring and the remaining hooks decrease progressively in size posteriorly.

The life cycle of H. niekerki remains unknown; however, like other acanthocephalans, it likely involves complex life cycles with at least two hosts. Although the intermediate host for Heptamegacanthus is not definitively identified, it is presumed to be an arthropod such as an insect. In this host, the larvae develop into an infectious stage known as a cystacanth. These are then ingested by the definitive host, where they mature and reproduce sexually within the intestines. The resulting eggs are expelled and hatch into new larvae.

== Taxonomy ==
Heptamegacanthus is a monotypic genus of acanthocephalans (also called thorny-headed or spiny-headed parasitic worms). The genus and species Heptamegacanthus niekerki was formally described in 1990 by Mary E. Spencer Jones, curator at the Natural History Museum, London, from specimens (5 females and 5 males) collected live, preserved, and sent from South Africa. The genus name Heptamegacanthus refers to the seven large hooks on its proboscis and the specific name niekerki derives from Jan van Niekerk, who collected the species in the field.

The classification of the genus Heptamegacanthus within the family Oligacanthorhynchidae is supported by six distinct morphological features. Firstly, its proboscis is more or less spherical, and equipped with hooks that feature an anterior strong base (manubrium) and a robust root for attachment. Additionally, sensory papillae on the proboscis enhance its sensory capabilities. The proboscis receptacle, a complex structure for housing the proboscis when retracted, consists of a thin, non-muscular outer layer and a thicker, muscular inner layer, which is pierced dorsally by muscles that retract the proboscis. The lemnisci, which are long, flattened structures containing several giant nuclei, play a role in the worm's sensory system. The presence of eight cement glands, each with a large central nucleus, is another distinguishing feature; these glands produce a substance used in the reproductive process. Finally, the eggs of Heptamegacanthus have an oval shape and distinctly textured outer shell. It differs from other worms in the family Oligacanthorhynchidae mainly by its smaller size, and the number and greater size of hooks in the anterior ring. The National Center for Biotechnology Information does not indicate that any phylogenetic analysis has been published on Heptamegacanthus that would confirm its position as a unique genus in the family Oligacanthorhynchidae.

== Description ==
Heptamegacanthus niekerki consists of a proboscis covered in hooks, a proboscis receptacle, and a trunk with a length twice that of the width. Sexual dimorphism is minimal, with the male being 3.49–4.23 mm long by 1.42–2.14 mm wide, only slightly larger than female at 3.15–3.59 mm long by 1.53–1.94 mm wide. This is unusual for acanthocephalans where the female is usually much larger than the male, but has been found in other acanthocephalans including Corynosoma. Heptamegacanthus is also very small for a member of the family Oligacanthorhynchidae. Although acanthocephalans are able to survive in accidental hosts without completing their development rendering them smaller than normal, this dwarfism has been ruled out for Heptamegacanthus as the samples collected were mature and females contained eggs indicating that the giant golden mole (Chrysospalax trevelyani) is a definitive and not a paratenic (organism that harbors the sexually immature parasites) or accidental host.

The proboscis is nearly spherical being 256–381 μm long and 435–604 μm wide in males and 281–381 μm long and 416–635 μm wide in females. It is armed with 40 to 45 hooks that are not radially symmetrical, with seven large anterior hooks. The hooks come in four distinct types: the first two rings of hooks have large bases (manubria) and roots, with the hooks in the very front (243–275 μm long in males and 256–297 μm long in females) being twice the size of those in the second row (81–180 μm long in males 103–199 μm long in females). Hooks towards the rear are spine-like, tapering to smaller sizes (43–84 μm to 28–52 μm long in males and 34–71 μm to 31–58 μm long in females long in males). One sensory papilla is present on each side of neck and on the apex of the proboscis. The proboscis receptacle originates on the body wall at about one quarter of body-length from the anterior end of the worm. The proboscis receptacle is single walled, having a small, non-muscular layer and inner large, muscular wall with well-developed retractor muscles penetrating the receptacle wall dorsally. The brain is located in the mid-region of the proboscis receptacle. The lemnisci (bundles of sensory nerve fibers) are long, extending nearly half the body length, flat, and contain several giant nuclei (0.832–1.635 mm long and 89–333 μm wide in the female). The worm does not have protonephridia, which are found in other acanthocephalan species for excretion and water regulation.

The testes of the male are large and tilted, 409 to 832 μm long and 204 to 525 μm wide, and are positioned towards the front half of the body before the central (pre-equatorial) dividing line. During copulation, the male injects semen from its seminal vesicle into its copulatory bursa (a fluid-filled sac). The Saefftigen's pouch (a muscular sac 832–877 μm long and 236–365 μm wide) then contracts, ejecting fluid causing the eversion of the copulatory bursa. The shape of the copulatory bursa grips the female during copulation. There are eight pre-equatorial cement glands that are 281–404 μm long and 243–436 μm wide, which are used to temporarily close the posterior end of the female after copulation, each with a single giant nucleus.

Females have a short, muscular reproductive system, including a uterine bell (a funnel like opening continuous with the uterus) that is large and short (179–218 μm long to 140–173 μm wide), a uterus (396–461 μm long and 166–224 μm wide), and a vagina (102–186 μm long and 32–173 μm diameter). Females produce numerous oval eggs that are 56–96 μm long and 43–52 μm wide with highly sculptured outer shells, stored in a space called the pseudocoel.

== Distribution ==
The distribution of H. niekerki is determined by that of its host, the giant golden mole. Heptamegacanthus niekerki has been found in the Nqadu Forest, Transkei, South Africa, the type locality. The giant golden mole's range is very limited (it is an endangered species), and consists only of isolated forest ranges in Pirie Forest and Komgha near King William's Town, East London, and Port St. Johns in the Transkei. The giant golden mole, and thus H. niekerki, is threatened primarily by the urbanization of the East London area causing fragmentation of forests and subsequent habitat loss. The forests are also being degraded by exploitation for firewood, bark, timber harvesting and livestock overgrazing/trampling.

== Hosts and pathology ==
Life cycle of Acanthocephala (Note: There are no known human infections for H. niekerki species.)

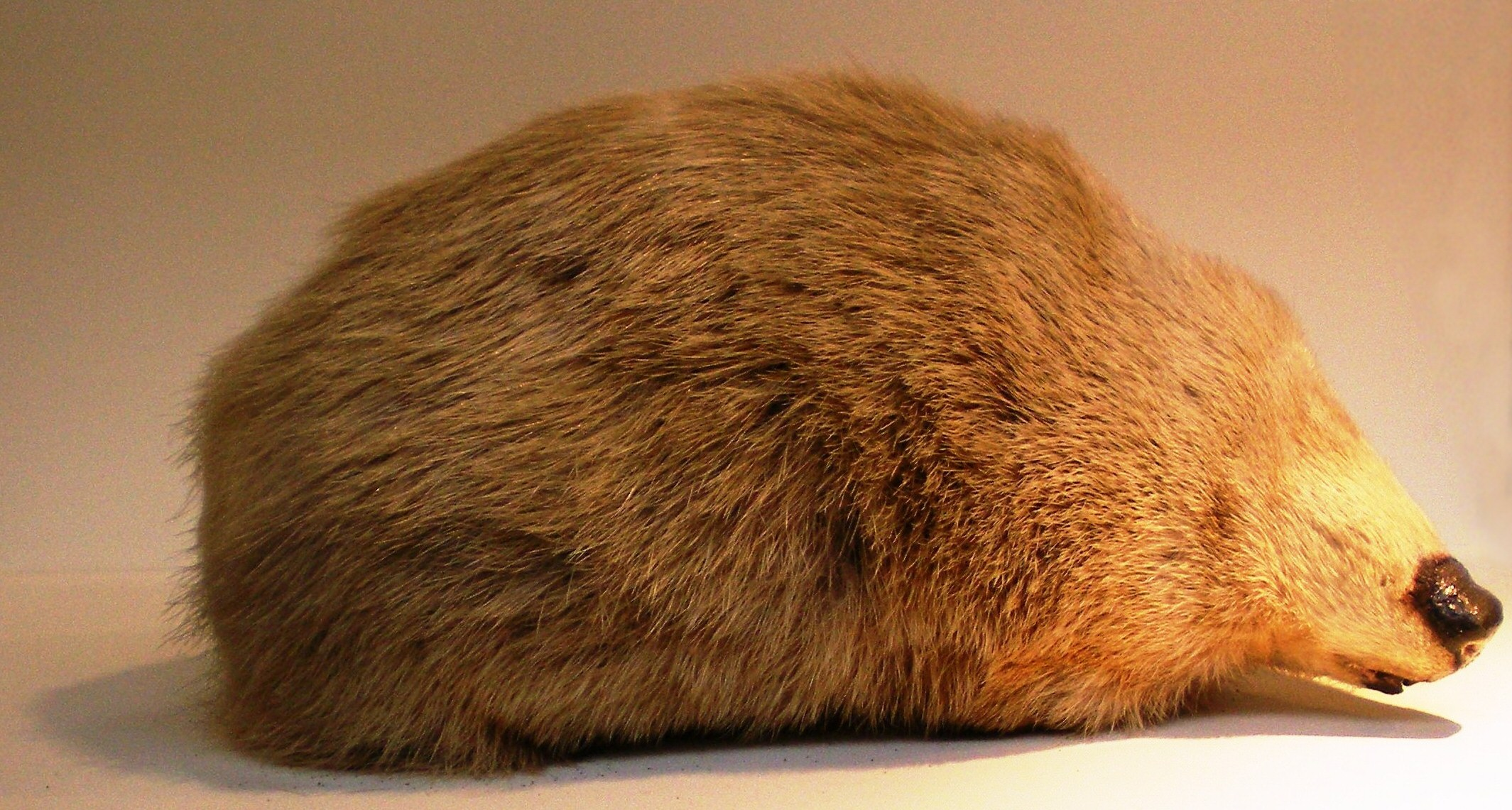
The giant golden mole is the type host of H. niekerki.

The specific life cycle of Heptamegacanthus is unknown, but the life cycle of thorny-headed worms, or acanthocephala, in general unfolds in three distinct stages. It begins when an egg develops into an infective form known as an acanthor. This acanthor is released with the feces of its definitive host, typically a vertebrate, and must be ingested by an intermediate host, an arthropod such as an insect, to continue its development. Although the specific intermediate hosts for the genus Heptamegacanthus are unidentified, it is generally accepted that insects serve as the primary intermediaries for the broader order Oligacanthorhynchida to which it belongs.

Once inside the intermediate host, the acanthor sheds its outer layer in a process called molting, transitioning into its next stage, the acanthella. At this stage, when H. niekerki measures between 38–60 μm in length and 19–26 μm in width, it burrows into the host's intestinal wall and continues to grow. The life cycle culminates in the formation of a cystacanth, a larval stage that retains juvenile features (differing from the adult only in size and stage of sexual development) and awaits ingestion by the definitive host to mature fully. Once inside the definitive host, these larvae attach themselves to the intestinal walls, mature into sexually reproductive adults, and complete the cycle by releasing new acanthors into the host's feces.

Heptamegacanthus niekerki has been found attached to the wall of the rectum in the giant golden mole. There are no known paratenic hosts where Heptamegacanthus might reside without undergoing further development or reproduction. There are no reported cases of H. niekerki infesting humans in the English-language medical literature.
