= Pyriproboscis =

Scientific classification
- Kingdom: Animalia
- Phylum: Acanthocephala
- Class: Palaeacanthocephala
- Order: Polymorphida
- Family: Pyriprobosicidae
- Genus: Pyriproboscis; Amin, Abdullah & Mhaisen, 2003
- Species: P. heronensis

Binomial name
- Pyriproboscis heronensis (Pichelin, 1997) (Note: A binomial authority in parentheses indicates that the species was originally described in a genus other than Pyriproboscis.)

Genus of thorny-headed worms

Pyriproboscis is a monotypic genus of acanthocephalans (thorny-headed or spiny-headed parasitic worms). It is the only genus in the family Pyriprobosicidae.

== Taxonomy ==
The genus was described by Amin, Abdullah & Mhaisen in 2003. Phylogenetic analysis has been published on Pyriproboscis heronensis. There is one genus Pyriproboscis and one species, Pyriproboscis heronensis in the family Pyriprobosicidae. Pyriproboscis heronensis was originally named Pomphorhynchus heronensis by Pichelin in 1997 but was renamed by Amin, Abdullah and Mhaisen in 2003.

== Description ==
Pyriproboscis heronensis consists of a proboscis covered in hooks and a trunk.

== Distribution ==
The distribution of Pyriproboscis heronensis is determined by that of its hosts. It was found in Heron Island, Australia.

== Hosts ==
Life cycle of Acanthocephala. (Note: There are no known aberrant human infections for Pyriproboscis species.)

The life cycle of an acanthocephalan consists of three stages beginning when an infective acanthor (development of an egg) is released from the intestines of the definitive host and then ingested by an arthropod, the intermediate host. Although the intermediate hosts of Pyriproboscis are arthropods. When the acanthor molts, the second stage called the acanthella begins. This stage involves penetrating the wall of the mesenteron or the intestine of the intermediate host and growing. The final stage is the infective cystacanth which is the larval or juvenile state of an Acanthocephalan, differing from the adult only in size and stage of sexual development. The cystacanths within the intermediate hosts are consumed by the definitive host, usually attaching to the walls of the intestines, and as adults they reproduce sexually in the intestines. The acanthor is passed in the feces of the definitive host and the cycle repeats. There may be paratenic hosts (hosts where parasites infest but do not undergo larval development or sexual reproduction) for Pyriproboscis.

Pyriproboscis parasitizes animals. There are no reported cases of Pyriproboscis species infesting humans in the English language medical literature.

Hosts for Pyriproboscis

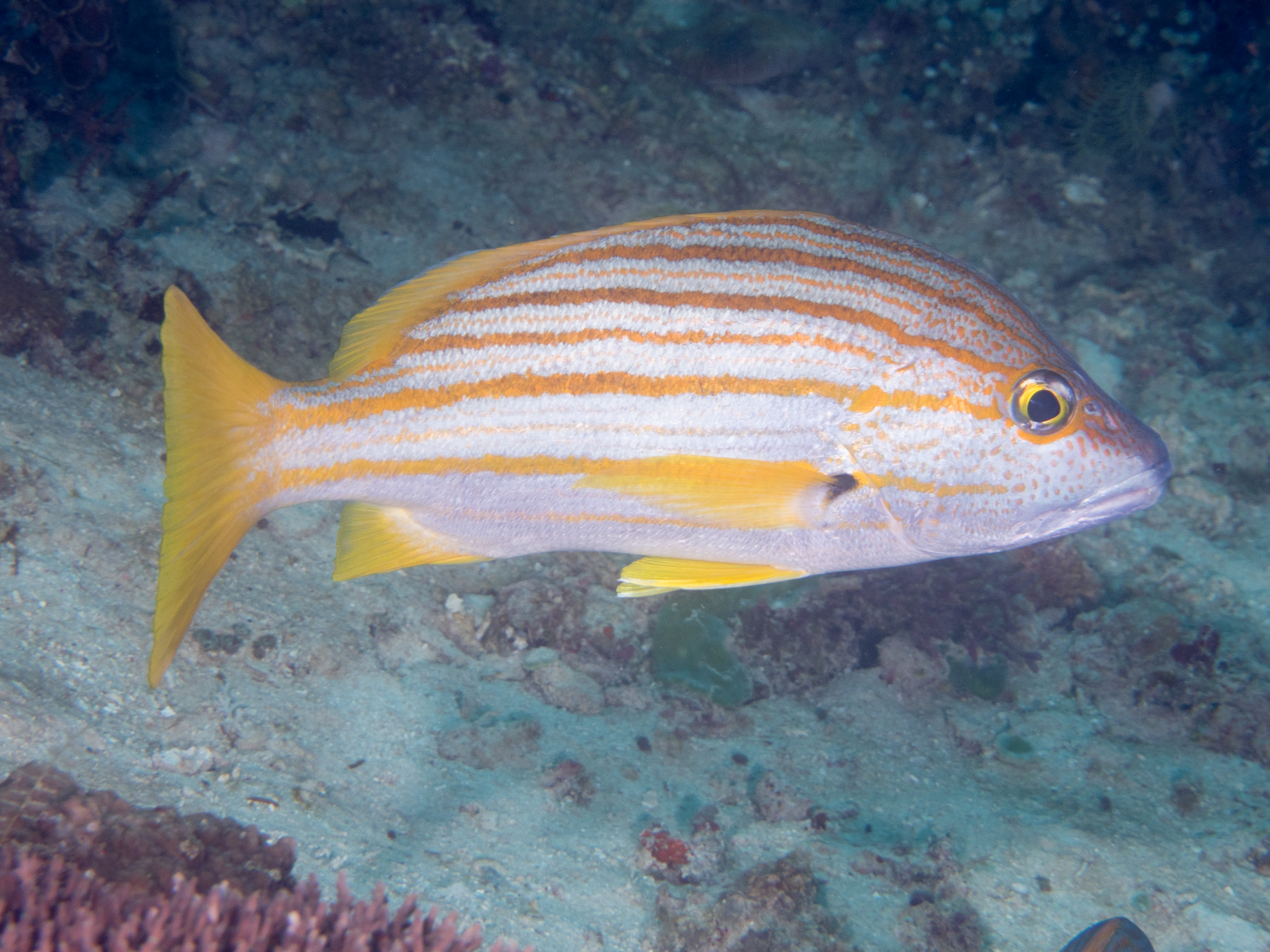
The Spanish flag snapper is one of the hosts of P. heronensis
