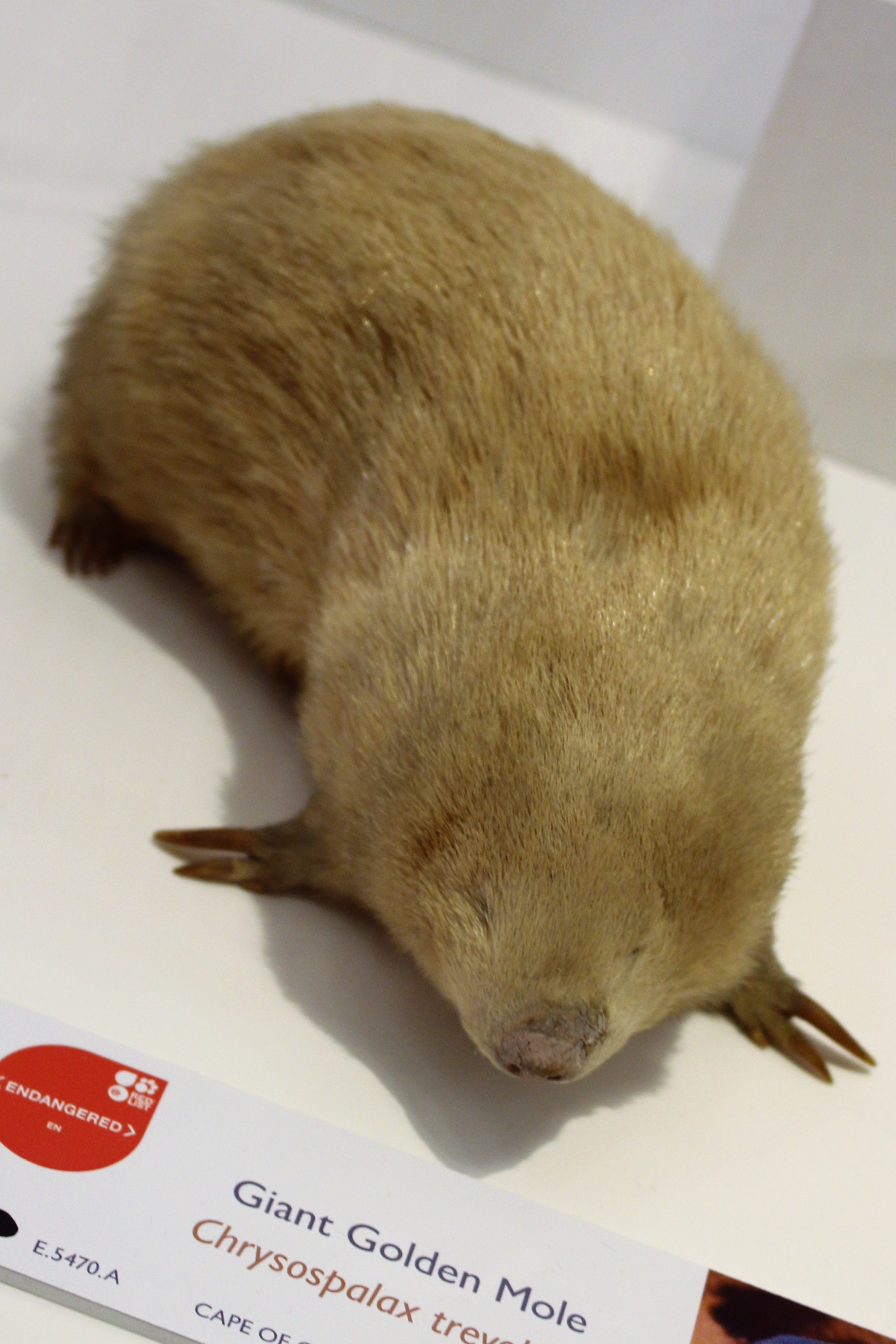

Conservation status
- Endangered (IUCN 3.1)

Scientific classification
- Kingdom: Animalia
- Phylum: Chordata
- Class: Mammalia
- Order: Afrosoricida
- Family: Chrysochloridae
- Genus: Chrysospalax
- Species: C. trevelyani

Binomial name
- Chrysospalax trevelyani (Günther, 1875)

= Giant golden mole =

Species of mammal

The giant golden mole (Chrysospalax trevelyani) is a small mammal found in Africa. At 23 centimetres (9.1 in) in length, it is the largest of the golden mole species. This mole has dark, glossy brown fur; the name golden comes from the Greek word for green-gold, also the source of the name of the family, Chrysochloridae.

== Characteristics ==
The giant golden mole has a subterranean lifestyle. It has large claws around 17 millimetres (0.67 in) long and 7 millimetres (0.28 in) across the base, powerful forelimbs, no external tail or ears, wedge-shaped head, leather pad, and skin covering the eyes. It is approximately 208–235 millimetres (8.2–9.3 in) in length and 410–500 grams (14–18 oz) in weight. Its skin is dark and brown on the upper parts and faded on the underparts, sometimes with a darker line down the mid-throat. Its coloration is slightly darker on the head, with two dull yellow patches where the eyes would be, and a yellow patch around the ear openings. Its hair is longer and coarser than any other species of golden mole: about 20 millimetres (0.79 in) long, thick, with dense, woolly underfur.

== Biology ==
The largest, rarest, and most endangered of all 17 species of golden moles, the giant golden mole spends most of its time underground and is blind and deaf. It is nocturnal, hunting mostly at night, but also in some cool and cloudy daytime conditions. It is solitary; it does not form groups, despite some social behavior such as hibernating in others' burrows among the roots of trees in winter, only moving slightly to keep its body temperature in range and twitching to maintain body temperature while sleeping. Female giant golden moles give birth to one or two offspring at a time while it has stocks of food supply. The acanthocephalan Heptamegacanthus niekerki has been found parasitizing the giant golden mole by attaching to the wall of the rectum.

=== Diet ===
The giant golden mole digs semi-permanent tunnels about 10 metres (33 ft) in length linked by surface runways for hunting food and may feed on the surface hiding in the leaf litter. It eats mainly millipedes and giant earthworms, but also crickets, cockroaches, grasshoppers, worms, and snails.

== Habitat ==
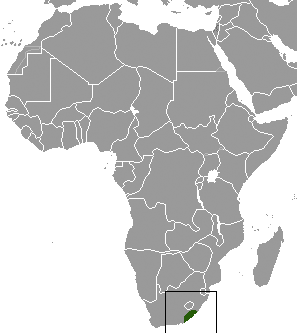
The giant golden mole is endemic to South Africa.

The giant golden mole is a subterranean small mammal, living in chambers and passages underneath a very specific habitat, forests with soft soil, deep leaf litter layers, and well-developed undergrowth. The giant golden mole is endemic to South Africa, mostly in a restricted area in the Eastern Cape.

== Population ==
=== Status ===
The giant golden mole was classified as Endangered (EN) in 2010 on IUCN Red List of Threatened Species. The population is decreasing due to habitat loss resulting mainly from human activities affecting its habitat such as firewood collection, bark stripping, cutting for construction, overgrazing of livestock, and clearance of forest. Moreover, the giant golden mole is preyed on by domestic dogs in that area.

=== Conservation ===
The giant golden mole currently receives little protection, and is not a main conservation target. Research is needed to protect this species and to assess the status and viability of the remaining populations.
