= Isthomosacanthidae =

Scientific classification
- Domain: Eukaryota
- Kingdom: Animalia
- Phylum: Rotifera
- Class: Palaeacanthocephala
- Order: Polymorphida
- Family: Isthomosacanthidae; Smales, 2012

Family of thorny-headed worms

Isthomosacanthidae is a family of parasitic spiny-headed (or thorny-headed) worms.

== Species ==
Isthomosacanthidae contains the following genera and species: (Note: A binomial authority in parentheses indicates that the species was originally described in a genus other than the present genus.)

=== Golvanorhynchus ===
Golvanorhynchus Noronha, Fabio & Pinto, 1978 contains one species.

- Golvanorhynchus golvani Noronha, Fabio & Magalhaes, 1978

G. golvani was found parasitizing the Atlantic chub mackerel (Scomber colias).

=== Gorgorhynchoides ===
Gorgorhynchoides Cable and Linderoth, 1963 contains many species.

- Gorgorhynchoides bullocki Cable and Mafarachisi, 1970
- Gorgorhynchoides cablei (Gupta and Fatma, 1987)
- Gorgorhynchoides cribbi Smales, 2014
- Gorgorhynchoides elongatus Cable and Linderoth, 1963
- Gorgorhynchoides epinepheli Wang, 1986
- Gorgorhynchoides gnathanodontos Smales, 2014
- Gorgorhynchoides golvani (Chandra, Hanumantha-Rao and Shyamasundari, 1984)

Found in Australia and has 14 to 16 rows of 3 large, 7 spiniform hooks on their proboscis.

- Gorgorhynchoides indicus Bhattacharya and Banerjee, 2003
- Gorgorhynchoides lintoni Cable and Mafarachisi, 1970
- Gorgorhynchoides orientalis (Wang, 1966)
- Gorgorhynchoides queenslandensis Smales, 2014
- Gorgorhynchoides valiyathurae (Nadakal, John and Jacob, 1990)

=== Serrasentis ===
Serrasentis Van Cleave, 1923 contains many species.

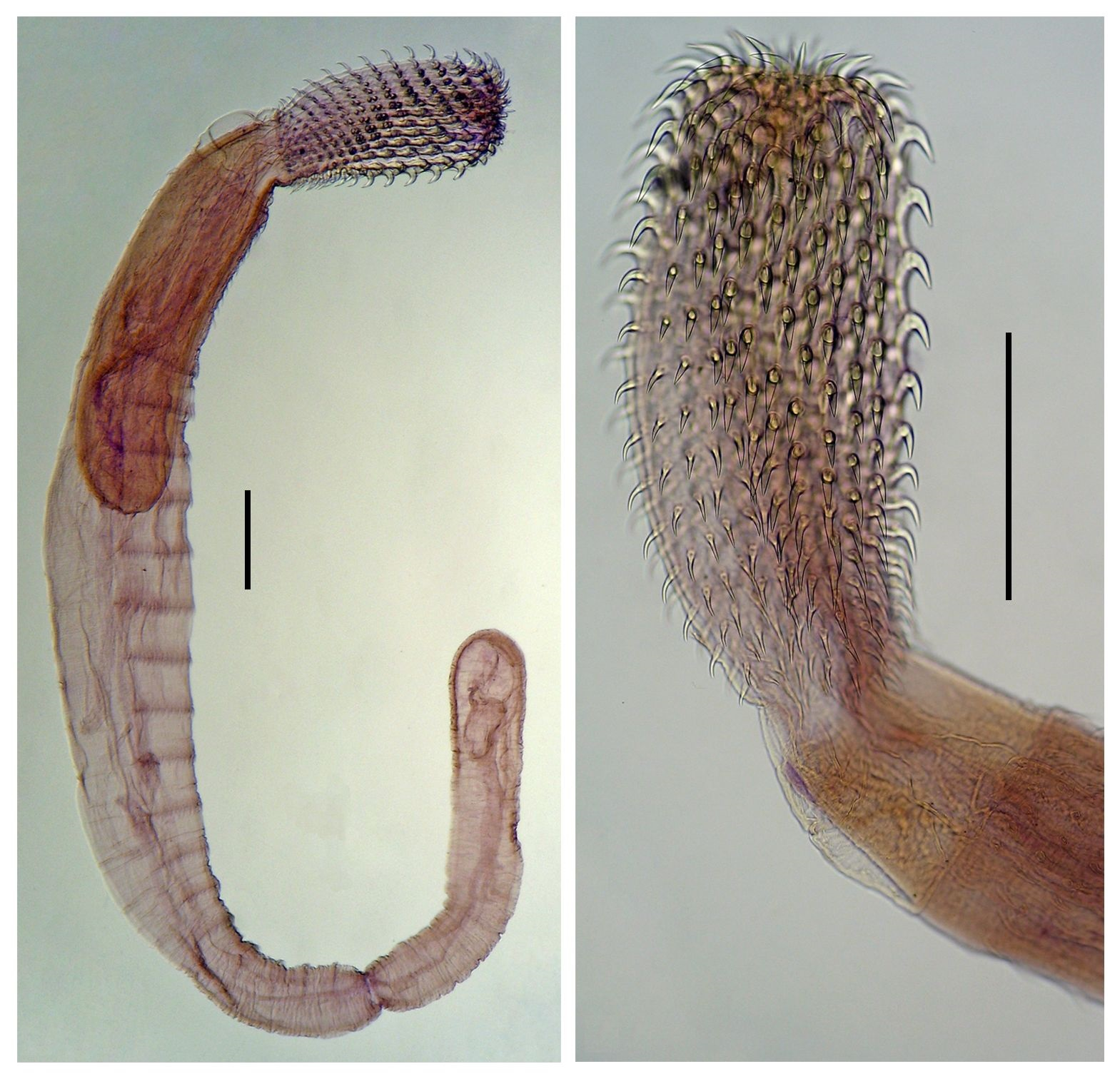
A juvenile male Serrasentis sagittifer with a detail of the proboscis and neck. Bars are 0.4 mm.

- Serrasentis engraulisi Gupta & Gupta, 1980
- Serrasentis fotedari Gupta & Fatma, 1980
- Serrasentis gibsoni
- Serrasentis golvani Gupta & Kumar, 1987
- Serrasentis lamelliger (Diesing, 1854)
- Serrasentis manazo Bilqees & Khan, 2005
- Serrasentis mujibi Bilqees, 1972
- Serrasentis nadakali George & Nadakal, 1978
- Serrasentis niger Kahatoon and Bilqees, 2007
- Serrasentis psenesi Gupta & Gupta, 1980
- Serrasentis sagittifer (Linton, 1889)
- Serrasentis sauridae Surekha and Vijayalakshmi, 2006
- Serrasentis sciaenus Bilqees, 1972
- Serrasentis sidaroszakaio Tadros, Iskandar & Wassef, 1979

== Hosts ==
Isthomosacanthidae species parasitize fish hosts.

Hosts for Diplosentidae species

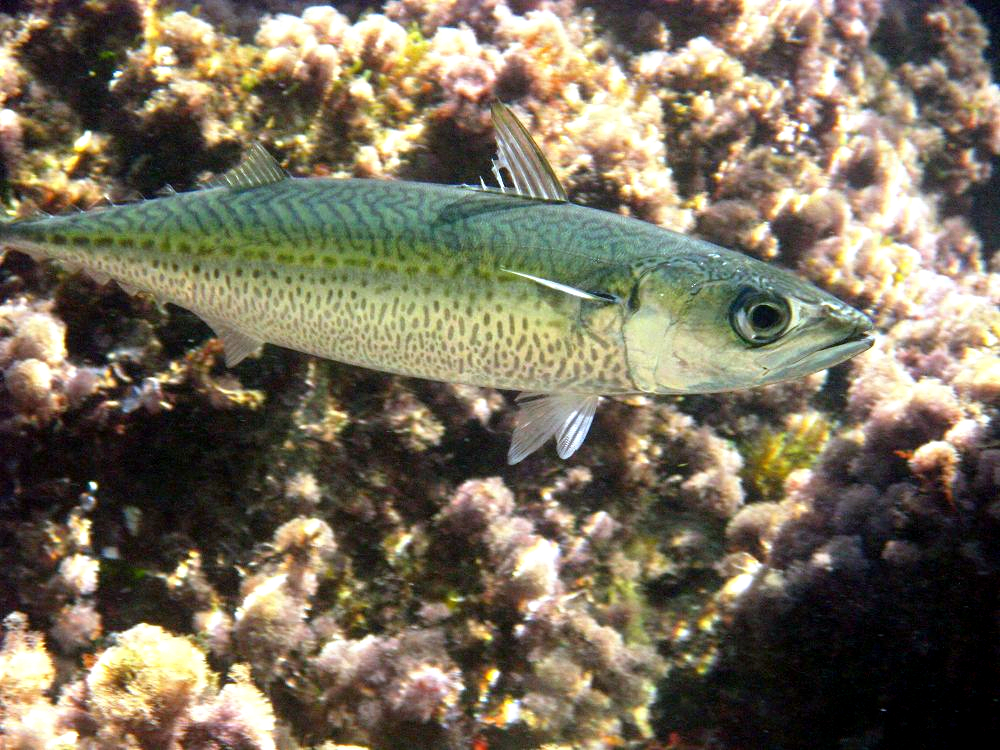
Golvanorhynchus golvani was found parasitizing the Atlantic chub mackerel.
