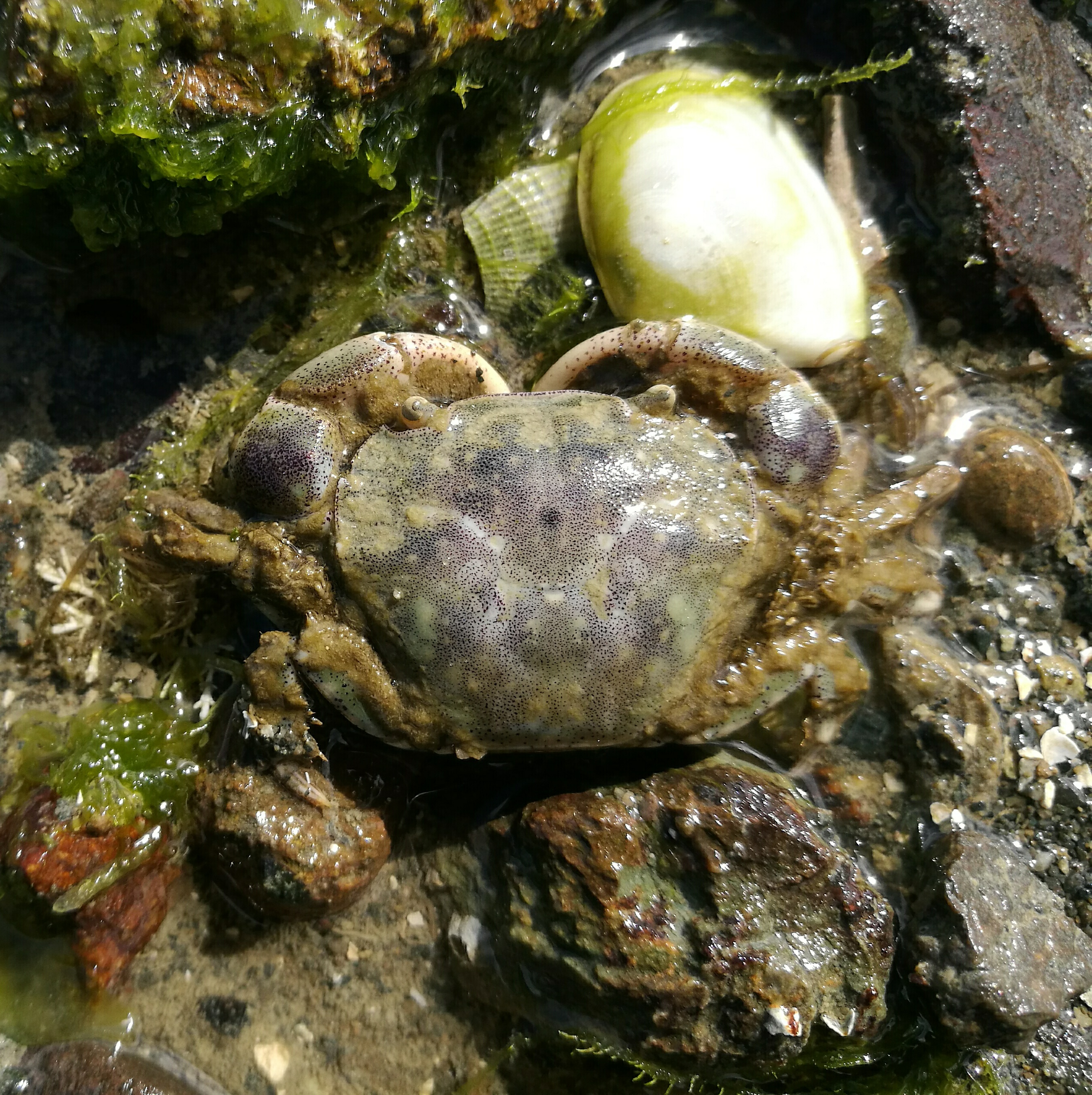

Scientific classification
- Kingdom: Animalia
- Phylum: Arthropoda
- Clade: Pancrustacea
- Class: Malacostraca
- Order: Decapoda
- Suborder: Pleocyemata
- Infraorder: Brachyura
- Family: Varunidae
- Genus: Hemigrapsus
- Species: H. crenulatus

Binomial name
- Hemigrapsus crenulatus (H. Milne-Edwards, 1837)

Synonyms
- Trichodactylus granarius Nicolet, 1849; Trichodactylus granulatus A. Milne-Edwards, 1853; Heterograpsus barbigerus Heller, 1862; Heterograpsus barbimanus Heller, 1865; Heterograpsus sanguineus Lenz, 1902

= Hemigrapsus crenulatus =

Species of crab

Hemigrapsus crenulatus, the hairy-handed crab or papaka huruhuru, is a marine crab of the family Varunidae, endemic to the New Zealand coast, although a taxon in Chile may be conspecific. It is an intertidal species with semi-terrestrial tendencies. They are named by their characteristic setae, or patches of thick hair, on the chelipeds and legs. They can range from green to brown in coloration. Adult crabs are generally 2–4 cm (0.8–1.6 in) wide at the carapace, although the smallest mature crabs can be around just 1 cm (0.4 in) wide. and are able to survive and reproduce in environments of widely varying salinities.

== History ==
There have been disputes throughout history about whether the two geographically distant populations were truly of the same species, beginning with Milne-Edwards' initial identification in 1837. He had access to specimens from both regions but did not specify the origin of the species he had named. With the ambiguous nature of this identification, in the following century, a series of further research comparing specimens from both New Zealand and Chile would introduce competing perspectives, specifically due to a small anatomical discrepancy. There was a slight difference in a ridge below the eyes, known as the stridulating ridge. A few names, now synonymous, have been given to both populations in the past. Mary J. Rathbun was the first to compare specimens from New Zealand and Chile and support the traditional view of a single species in 1918. This view was confirmed in 2011 through extensive morphological and genetic analysis.

== Reproduction and growth ==
The breeding season spans from June to January or February, with winter breeding being more common than summer breeding. The females are ovigerous, meaning they will carry the eggs on their undersides. Females are also capable of breeding twice within a season. Molting is generally concentrated before and after the breeding season. In perfect conditions of temperature and salinity, the minimum incubation time for the eggs was 45 days, with time and egg size tending to increase with lower salinity.

During the process of maturation, defined as possessing the ability to reproduce, male carapaces develop circularly while female carapaces develop elliptically, in a horizontal manner. This is done to increase the width of the abdomen in order to hold more eggs. The minimum carapace width of mature males is 1.3–1.5 cm (0.5–0.6 in) and that of mature females is 0.9–1.1 cm (0.3–0.4 in), with the general range being 1.2–2.0 cm (0.5–0.8 in). Mostly males account for the deviations outside this range. Males will also grow for longer, faster, and larger than females, potentially up to twice the initial mature size.

== Appearance and anatomy ==
Males and females are quite similar in appearance, both having a circular carapace that is slightly wider than it is long from the dorsal view. The New Zealand crabs are more green in coloration while the Chilean crabs are more brown. An array of pale spots can be seen on the carapace in a similar pattern for both sexes. Adult crabs have carapace widths of 2–4 cm (0.8–1.6 in) when they are fully grown. Small granules, or protrusions, can be seen on the shell from the ventral view towards the front of the crab. Eye sockets are wide. Few small teeth can be seen along the rim of the front sides of the carapace. Male appendages tend to be more pilose (hairy) at the base of the claws and along the lengths of the legs. The thickness of the hair sometimes even interferes with the operation and function of the claw. The outer surface of the claw is granulate, with the fixed finger of the claw bent downwards and into the palm. The arm is triangular and has a transverse row of granules extending across the ventral surface.

The stridulating ridge, a ridge situated below and across both eyes, can be seen from the anterior-posterior view. It is continuously granulate in females, but the patterning is more segmented in males. Variations to this cross-sex positioning of granules and lobes was used in some arguments against the crabs from New Zealand and Chile being the same species.

== Ecology and behavior ==
H. crenulatus can be found throughout mainland New Zealand as well as the west coast of Chile. They are euryhaline, meaning they are able to survive in environments with a wide range of salinities. These may include estuaries, brackish waters, and the intertidal. In one incidence reported by E.F. Stead, between 1910 and 1912, after a storm had introduced a large influx of salt water to a freshwater lake, H. crenulatus populated the surroundings until the salt levels resolved. In the intertidal, there are rarely any below the low-water mark, although female crabs predominate at the lower levels.

They characterized as burrowing crabs, as they will hide under stones or burrow into sand and mud. Thus, they prefer softer substrates to help them avoid conditions of intense light, high temperatures, and high salinities.

The semi-terrestrial aspect of these crabs means they will spend time away from the shore. For example, they will migrate up the shore along with the rising tide to feed in terrestrial areas at high tide before retreating with the falling water levels.
