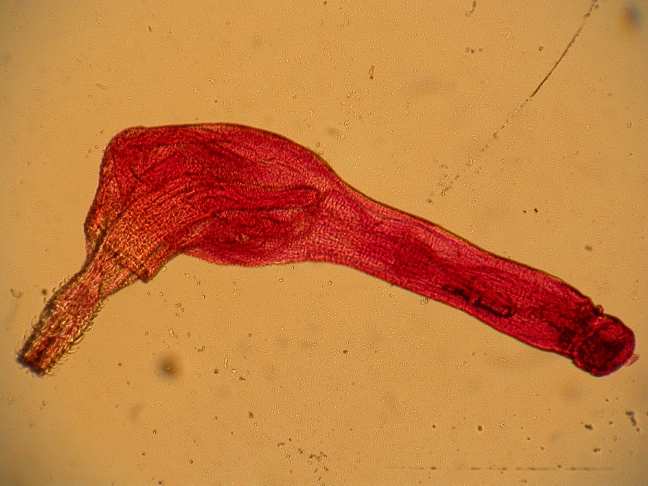
- Corynosoma wegeneri photomicrograph

Scientific classification
- Kingdom: Animalia
- Phylum: Acanthocephala
- Class: Palaeacanthocephala
- Order: Polymorphida
- Family: Polymorphidae; Meyer, 1931

= Polymorphidae =

Family of thorny-headed worms

The thorny-headed worm family Polymorphidae contains endoparasites which as adults feed mainly in fish and aquatic birds. When this taxon was erected by Meyer in 1931, a subfamily Polymorphinae was established in it. As the Polymorphidae as presently understood would then be monotypic, with no basal genera outside the Polymorphinae, the proposed subfamily is redundant for the time being and therefore most modern treatments simply omit it. Polymorphus minutus is an economically significant parasite in goose and duck farming.

== Species ==
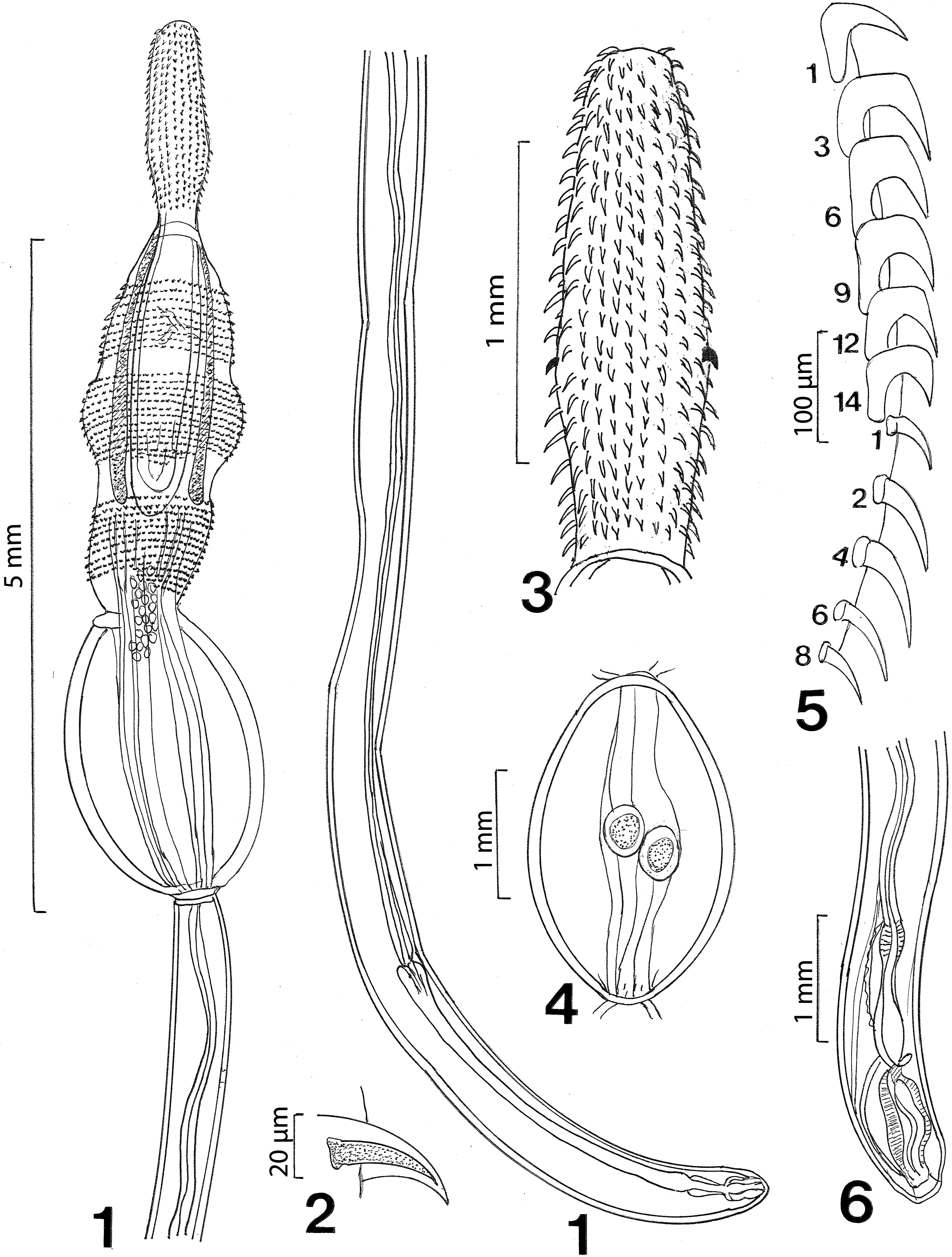
Neoandracantha peruensis

Polymorphidae contains the following species: (Note: A binomial authority in parentheses indicates that the species was originally described in a genus other than the present genus.)

=== Andracantha ===
Andracantha Schmidt, 1975 contains many species:

- Andracantha baylisi (Zdzitowiecki, 1986) Zdzitowiecki, 1989
- Andracantha clavata (Goss, 1940)
- Andracantha gravida (Alegret, 1941) Schmidt, 1975
- Andracantha mergi Lundström, 1942
- Andracantha phalacrocoracis (Yamaguti, 1939)
- Andracantha tandemtesticulata Monteiro, Amato & Amato, 2006
- Andracantha tunitae (Weiss, 1914)

=== Ardeirhynchus ===
Ardeirhynchus Dimitrova and Georgiev, 1994

- Ardeirhynchus spiralis (Rudolphi, 1809)

=== Arhythmorhynchus ===
Arhythmorhynchus Lühe, 1911

- Arhythmorhynchus capellae (Yamaguti, 1935)
- Arhythmorhynchus comptus Van Cleave & Rausch, 1950
- Arhythmorhynchus distinctus Baer, 1956
- Arhythmorhynchus eroliae (Yamaguti, 1939)
- Arhythmorhynchus frassoni (Molin, 1858)
- Arhythmorhynchus frontospinosus (Tubangui, 1935)
- Arhythmorhynchus jeffreyi Schmidt, 1973
- Arhythmorhynchus johnstoni Golvan, 1960
- Arhythmorhynchus limosae Edmonds, 1971
- Arhythmorhynchus petrochenkoi (Schmidt, 1969)
- Arhythmorhynchus plicatus (von Linstow, 1883)
- Arhythmorhynchus pumiliorostris Van Cleave, 1916
- Arhythmorhynchus rubicundus (Molin, 1859)
- Arhythmorhynchus siluricola Dollfus, 1929
- Arhythmorhynchus suecicus Lundström, 1942
- Arhythmorhynchus teres Van Cleave, 1920
- Arhythmorhynchus tigrinus Moghe and Das, 1953
- Arhythmorhynchus trichocephalus (Leuckart, 1876)
- Arhythmorhynchus tringi Gubanov, 1952
- Arhythmorhynchus turbidus (Van Cleave, 1937)
- Arhythmorhynchus uncinatus (Kaiser, 1893) Lühe, 1912
- Arhythmorhynchus villoti Golvan, 1994
- Arhythmorhynchus xeni Atrashkevich, 1978

=== Bolbosoma ===
There are twelve species assigned to the genus Bolbosoma Porta, 1908

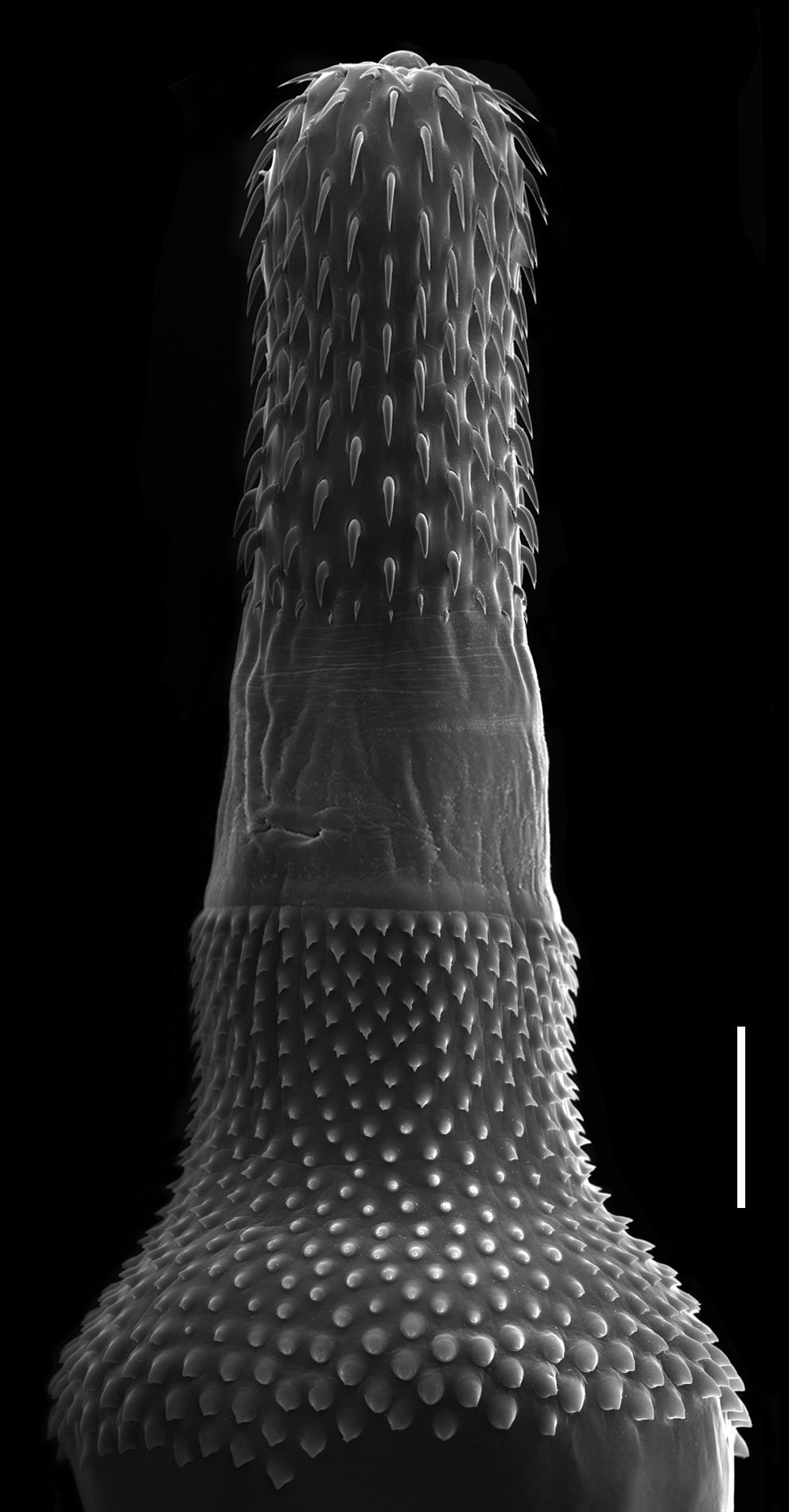
Proboscis, neck and trunk spines of a juvenile Bolbosoma turbinella. Bars is 200um.

=== Corynosoma ===
Corynosoma Lühe, 1904 contains many species

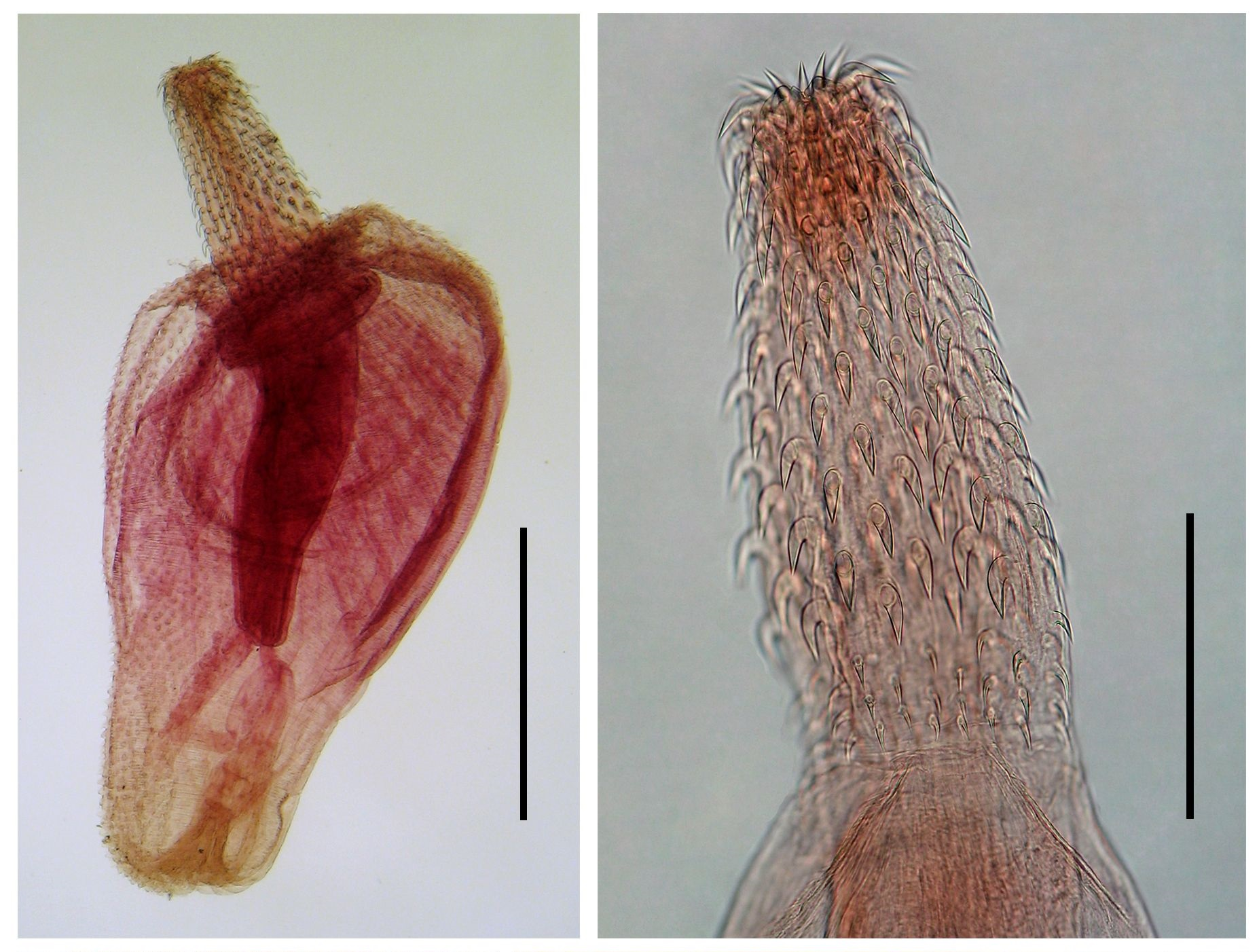
A juvenile female Corynosoma australe with a detail of the proboscis. Bar on the left is 1mm and the bar on the right is 0.25mm.

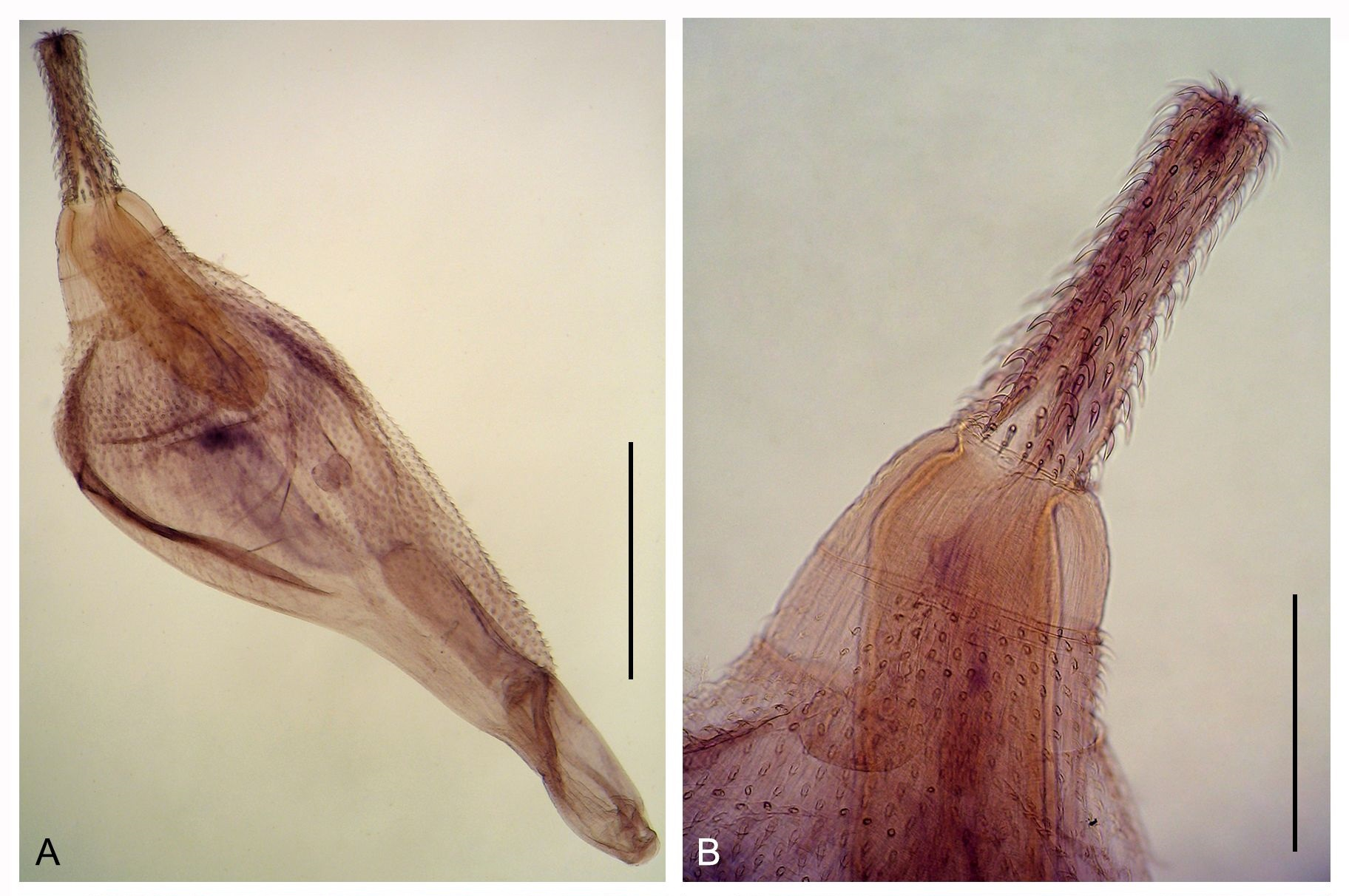
Male juvenile Corynosoma cetaceum with a detail of the proboscis, neck, and trunk spines. Bar on the left is 1mm and the bar on the right is 0.5mm.

- Corynosoma alaskense Golvan, 1958
- Corynosoma australe Johnston, 1937
- Corynosoma beaglense Laskowski, Jeżewski & Zdzitowiecki, 2008
- Corynosoma bullosum (Linstow, 1892)
- Corynosoma cameroni Van Cleave, 1953
- Corynosoma capsicum Golvan and Mokhayer, 1973
- Corynosoma cetaceum Johnston & Best, 1942
- Corynosoma curilense Gubanov, 1942
- Corynosoma enhydri Morozov, 1940
- Corynosoma eperlani (Linstow, 1884)
- Corynosoma erignathi Stryukov, 2000
- Corynosoma evae Zdzitowiecki, 1984
- Corynosoma falcatum Van Cleave, 1953
- Corynosoma gibsoni Zdzitowiecki, 1986
- Corynosoma hadweni Van Cleave, 1953
- Corynosoma hamanni (Linstow, 1892)
- Corynosoma hannae Zdzitowiecki, 1984
- Corynosoma longilemniscatus Machado-Filho, 1961
- Corynosoma macrosomum Neiland, 1962
- Corynosoma magdaleni Montreuil, 1958
- Corynosoma mandarinca Oshmarin, 1963
- Corynosoma obtuscens Lincicome, 1943
- Corynosoma osmeri Fujita, 1921
- Corynosoma otariae Morini and Boero, 1961
- Corynosoma pseudohamanni Zdzitowiecki, 1984
- Corynosoma pyriforme (Bremser, 1824)
- Corynosoma rauschi Golvan, 1958
- Corynosoma reductum (Linstow, 1905)
- Corynosoma semerme (Forssell, 1904)
- Corynosoma septentrionale Treshchev, 1966
- Corynosoma seropedicus Machado-Filho, 1970
- Corynosoma shackletoni Zdzitowiecki, 1978
- Corynosoma simile Neiland, 1962
- Corynosoma stanleyi Smales, 1986
- Corynosoma strumosum (Rudolphi, 1802) Lühe, 1904
- Corynosoma sudsuche Belopolskaia, 1958
- Corynosoma validum Van Cleave, 1953
- Corynosoma ventronudum Skrjabin, 1959
- Corynosoma villosum Van Cleave, 1953
- Corynosoma wegeneri Heinze, 1934

Diplospinifer Fukui, 1929

- Diplospinifer serpenticola Fukui, 1929

=== Filicollis ===
Filicollis Lühe, 1911 contains two species.

- Filicollis anatis (Schrank, 1788)
- Filicollis trophimenkoi Atrashkevich, 1982

=== Ibirhynchus ===
Ibirhynchus García-Valera, Pérez-Ponce de León, Aznar and Nadler, 2011

- Ibirhynchus dimorpha (Schmidt, 1973)

=== Neoandracantha ===
Neoandracantha Amin & Heckmann, 2017 is a monotypic genus containing only Neoandracantha peruensis Amin & Heckmann, 2017

=== Polymorphus ===
The genus polymorphus Lühe, 1911 uses amphipod crustaceans as intermediate hosts and various birds as final hosts. The genus used to be a larger group, but species that were formerly placed in the genus have now been placed in the genus Profilicollis based on morphological characteristics and the use of decapod crustaceans as intermediate hosts.

- Polymorphus actuganensis Petrochenko, 1949
- Polymorphus acutis Van Cleave and Starrett, 1940
- Polymorphus arctocephali Smales, 1986
- Polymorphus ariusis (Bilqees, 1971)
- Polymorphus biziurae Johnston and Edmonds, 1948
- Polymorphus boschadis (Schrank, 1788)
- Polymorphus brevis (Van Cleave, 1916)
- Polymorphus chongqingensis Liu, Zhang and Zhang, 1990
- Polymorphus cincli Belopolskaya, 1959
- Polymorphus contortus (Bremser in Westrumb, 1821)
- Polymorphus corynoides Skrjabin, 1913
- Polymorphus corynosoma Travassos, 1915
- Polymorphus crassus Van Cleave, 1924
- Polymorphus cucullatus Van Cleave and Starrett, 1940
- Polymorphus diploinflatus Lundström, 1942
- Polymorphus fatimaae Khan, Dharejo, Birmani and Bilqees, 2008
- Polymorphus fulicai Birmani, Dharejo and Khan, 2011
- Polymorphus gavii Hokhlova, 1965
- Polymorphus inermis Travassos, 1923
- Polymorphus karachiensis (Bilqees, 1971)
- Polymorphus kostylewi Petrochenko, 1949
- Polymorphus magnus Skrjabin, 1913
- Polymorphus marchii (Porta, 1910)
- Polymorphus marilis Van Cleave, 1939
- Polymorphus mathevossianae Petrochenko, 1949
- Polymorphus meyeri Lundström, 1942
- Polymorphus miniatus (von Linstow, 1896)
- Polymorphus minutus (Goeze, 1782)
- Polymorphus mohiuddini Muti-ur-Rahman, Khan, Bilqees and Khatoon, 2008
- Polymorphus mutabilis (Rudolphi, 1819)
- Polymorphus nickoli Khan and Bilqees, 1998
- Polymorphus obtusus Van Cleave, 1918
- Polymorphus paradoxus Connell and Corner, 1957
- Polymorphus paucihamatus Heinze, 1936
- Polymorphus phippsi Kostylew, 1922
- Polymorphus piriformis (Bremser in Rudolphi, 1819)
- Polymorphus pupa (von Linstow, 1905)
- Polymorphus sichuanensis Wang and Zhang, 1987
- Polymorphus sindensis Khan, Ghazi and Bilqees, 2002
- Polymorphus spindlatus Amin and Heckmann, 1991
- Polymorphus striatus (Goeze, 1782)
- Polymorphus strumosoides Lundström, 1942
- Polymorphus swartzi Schmidt, 1965
- Polymorphus trochus Van Cleave, 1945

=== Profilicollis ===
Profilicollis Meyer, 1931 contains many species:

- Profilicollis altmani (Perry, 1942) Van Cleave, 1947
- Profilicollis antarcticus (Zdzitowiecki, 1985)
- Profilicollis arcticus (Van Cleave, 1920)
- Profilicollis botulus (Van Cleave, 1916)
- Profilicollis chasmagnathi (Holcman-Spector, Mañé-Garzón & Dei-Cas, 1977) Golvan, 1994
- Profilicollis formosus (Schmidt & Kuntz, 1967)
- Profilicollis major (Lundström, 1942)
- Profilicollis novaezelandensis Brockerhoff & Smales, 2002
- Profilicollis sphaerocephalus (Bremser in Rudolphi, 1819)

=== Pseudocorynosoma ===
Pseudocorynosoma Aznar, Pérez-Ponce de León & Raga, 2006 contains several species:

- Pseudocorynosoma anatarium (Van Cleave, 1945) Aznar, Pérez-Ponce de León & Raga, 2006
- Pseudocorynosoma constrictum (Van Cleave, 1918) Aznar, Pérez-Ponce de León & Raga, 2006
- Pseudocorynosoma enrietti (Molfi & Fernandes, 1953) Aznar, Pérez-Ponce de León & Raga, 2006
- Pseudocorynosoma iheringi (Machado-Filho, 1961) Aznar, Pérez-Ponce de León & Raga, 2006
- Pseudocorynosoma peposacae (Porta, 1914) Aznar, Pérez-Ponce de León & Raga, 2006
- Pseudocorynosoma tepehuanesi García-Varela, Henández-Orts & Pinacho-Pinacho, 2017

=== Southwellina ===
Southwellina Witenberg, 1932 contains three species:

- Southwellina hispida (Van Cleave, 1925)
- Southwellina macracanthus (Ward and Winter, 1952)
- Southwellina sacra Bhattacharya, Pande & Srivastaca, 2002

=== Tenuisoma ===
Tenuisoma contains one species:

- Tenuisoma tarapungi

T. tarapungi was found in the intestines of the red-billed gull (Chroicocephalus scopulinus) on the coast of Otago, New Zealand.
