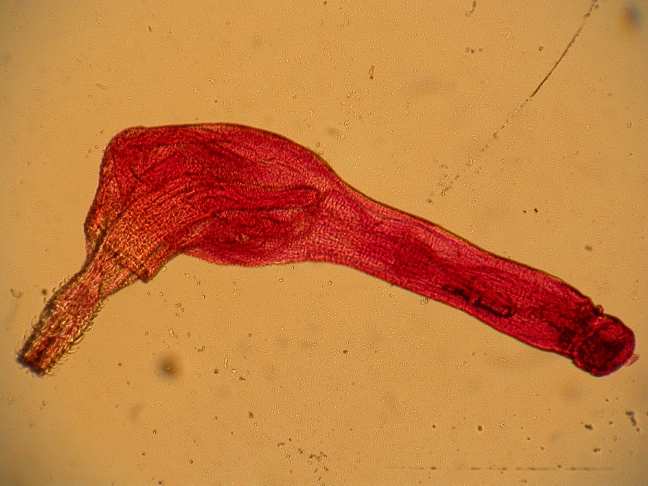
- Corynosoma wegeneri

Scientific classification
- Kingdom: Animalia
- Phylum: Acanthocephala
- Class: Palaeacanthocephala
- Order: Polymorphida; Petrochenko, 1956

= Polymorphida =

Order of thorny-headed worms

Polymorphida are an order of thorny-headed worms (phylum Acanthocephala). The adults of these parasitic platyzoans feed mainly on fish and aquatic birds.

This order contains 5 families:

- Centrorhynchidae Van Cleave, 1916
- Isthomosacanthidae Smales, 2012
- Plagiorhynchidae Meyer, 1931
- Pyriprobosicidae
- Polymorphidae Meyer, 1931
