= Oligoterorhynchus =

Scientific classification
- Domain: Eukaryota
- Kingdom: Animalia
- Phylum: Rotifera
- Class: Palaeacanthocephala
- Order: Polymorphida
- Family: Plagiorhynchidae
- Genus: Oligoterorhynchus; Monticelli, 1914

Genus of worms

Oligoterorhynchus is a genus of parasitic worms belonging to the family Plagiorhynchidae.

Species:

- Oligoterorhynchus campylurus (Nitzsch, 1857)
