= Pseudolueheia =

Scientific classification
- Domain: Eukaryota
- Kingdom: Animalia
- Phylum: Rotifera
- Class: Palaeacanthocephala
- Order: Polymorphida
- Family: Plagiorhynchidae
- Genus: Pseudolueheia; Schmidt & Kuntz, 1967

Genus of thorny-headed worms

Pseudolueheia is a genus of worms belonging to the family Plagiorhynchidae.

The species of this genus are found in Malesia.

Species:

- Pseudolueheia arunachalensis Bhattacharya, 2007
- Pseudolueheia boreotis (Van Cleave & Williams, 1951)
- Pseudolueheia korathai Gupta & Fatma, 1988
- Pseudolueheia pittae Schmidt & Kuntz, 1967
- Pseudolueheia tongsoni Salcedo & Celis, 2007
