= Sphaerechinorhynchus =

Scientific classification
- Domain: Eukaryota
- Kingdom: Animalia
- Phylum: Rotifera
- Class: Palaeacanthocephala
- Order: Polymorphida
- Family: Plagiorhynchidae
- Genus: Sphaerechinorhynchus; Johnston, 1929

Genus of thorny-headed worms

Sphaerechinorhynchus is a genus of worms belonging to the family Plagiorhynchidae.

The species of this genus are found in Southeastern Asia, Australia.

Species:

- Sphaerechinorhynchus macropisthospinus Amin, Wongsawad, Marayong, Saehoong, Suwattanacoupt & Say, 1998
- Sphaerechinorhynchus maximesospinus H.a.Amin & Heckmann, 2008
- Sphaerechinorhynchus ophiograndis Bolette, 1997
- Sphaerechinorhynchus rotundocapitatus (Johnston, 1912)
- Sphaerechinorhynchus serpenticola Schmidt & Kuntz, 1966
