= Porrorchis =

Scientific classification
- Domain: Eukaryota
- Kingdom: Animalia
- Phylum: Rotifera
- Class: Palaeacanthocephala
- Order: Polymorphida
- Family: Plagiorhynchidae
- Genus: Porrorchis; Fukui, 1929

Genus of thorny-headed worms

Porrorchis is a genus of worms belonging to the family Plagiorhynchidae.

The species of this genus are found in Malesia and Australia.

== Species ==
Species:

- Porrorchis aruensis Smales, 2010
- Porrorchis bazae (Southwell and Macfie, 1925)
- Porrorchis brevicanthus (Das, 1949)
- Porrorchis centropi (Porta, 1910)
- Porrorchis centropusi (Tubangui, 1933)
- Porrorchis chauhani Gupta and Fatma, 1986
- Porrorchis crocidurai Gupta and Fatma, 1986
- Porrorchis elongatus Fukui, 1929
- Porrorchis heckmanni Bilqees, Khan, Khatoon and Khatoon, 2007
- Porrorchis herpistis Bhattacharya, 2007
- Porrorchis houdemeri (Joyeux and Baer, 1935)
- Porrorchis hydromuris (Edmonds, 1957)
- Porrorchis hylae (Johnston, 1914)
- Porrorchis indicus (Das, 1957)
- Porrorchis jonesae Muti-ur-Rahman, Khan, Khatoon and Bilqees, 2010
- Porrorchis keralensis George and Nadakal, 1984
- Porrorchis kinsellai Lisitsyna, Tkach and Bush, 2012
- Porrorchis leibyi Schmidt and Kuntz, 1967
- Porrorchis maxvachoni (Golvan and Brygoo, 1965)
- Porrorchis nickoli Salgado-Maldonado and Cruz-Reyes, 2002
- Porrorchis oti Yamaguti, 1939
- Porrorchis rotundatus (von Linstow, 1897)
- Porrorchis tyto Amin, Ha and Heckmann, 2008
