= Pseudogordiorhynchus =

Scientific classification
- Domain: Eukaryota
- Kingdom: Animalia
- Phylum: Rotifera
- Class: Palaeacanthocephala
- Order: Polymorphida
- Family: Plagiorhynchidae
- Genus: Pseudogordiorhynchus; Golvan, 1957
- Species: P. antonmeyeri

Binomial name
- Pseudogordiorhynchus antonmeyeri Golvan, 1957

Genus of worms

Pseudogordiorhynchus is a monotypic genus of worms belonging to the family Plagiorhynchidae. The only species is Pseudogordiorhynchus antonmeyeri.
