= Plagiorhynchus =

Scientific classification
- Domain: Eukaryota
- Kingdom: Animalia
- Phylum: Rotifera
- Class: Palaeacanthocephala
- Order: Polymorphida
- Family: Plagiorhynchidae
- Genus: Plagiorhynchus; Lühe, 1911

Genus of worms

Plagiorhynchus is a genus of parasitic worms belonging to the family Plagiorhynchidae.

The genus has almost cosmopolitan distribution.

Species:

- Plagiorhynchus allisonae Smales, 2002
- Plagiorhynchus angrensis (Travassos, 1926)
- Plagiorhynchus asturi (Gupta & Lata, 1967)
