= Lueheia =

Scientific classification
- Kingdom: Animalia
- Phylum: Acanthocephala
- Class: Palaeacanthocephala
- Order: Polymorphida
- Family: Plagiorhynchidae
- Genus: Lueheia; Travassos, 1919

Genus of thorny-headed worms

Lueheia is a genus of worms belonging to the family Plagiorhynchidae.

== Taxonomy ==
The genus was described by Travassos in 1919. The National Center for Biotechnology Information does not indicate that only one phylogenetic analysis has been published on any Lueheia species that would confirm its position as a unique genus in the family Plagiorhynchidae. This was the ribosomal subunits of Lueheia aztecae.

== Description ==
Lueheia species consist of a proboscis covered in hooks and a long trunk.

== Species ==
The genus Lueheia contains five species.

- Lueheia adlueheia (Werby, 1938)
- Lueheia aztecae
- Lueheia cajabambensis Machado-Filho & Ibanez, 1967
- Lueheia inscripta (Westrumb, 1821)
- Lueheia karachiensis Khan, Bilqees & Muti-ur-Rahman, 2005
- Lueheia lueheia Travassos, 1919

== Distribution ==
The distribution of Lueheia is determined by that of its hosts. The species of this genus are found in Central America.

== Hosts ==
Life cycle of Acanthocephala. (Note: There are no known aberrant human infections for Lueheia species.)

The life cycle of an acanthocephalan consists of three stages beginning when an infective acanthor (development of an egg) is released from the intestines of the definitive host and then ingested by an arthropod, the intermediate host. The intermediate hosts of Lueheia are likely arthropods. When the acanthor molts, the second stage called the acanthella begins. This stage involves penetrating the wall of the mesenteron or the intestine of the intermediate host and growing. The final stage is the infective cystacanth which is the larval or juvenile state of an Acanthocephalan, differing from the adult only in size and stage of sexual development. The cystacanths within the intermediate hosts are consumed by the definitive host, usually attaching to the walls of the intestines, and as adults they reproduce sexually in the intestines. The acanthor is passed in the feces of the definitive host and the cycle repeats. There may be paratenic hosts (hosts where parasites infest but do not undergo larval development or sexual reproduction) for Lueheia.

Lueheia parasitizes animals. There are no reported cases of Lueheia infesting humans in the English language medical literature.

Hosts for Lueheia species

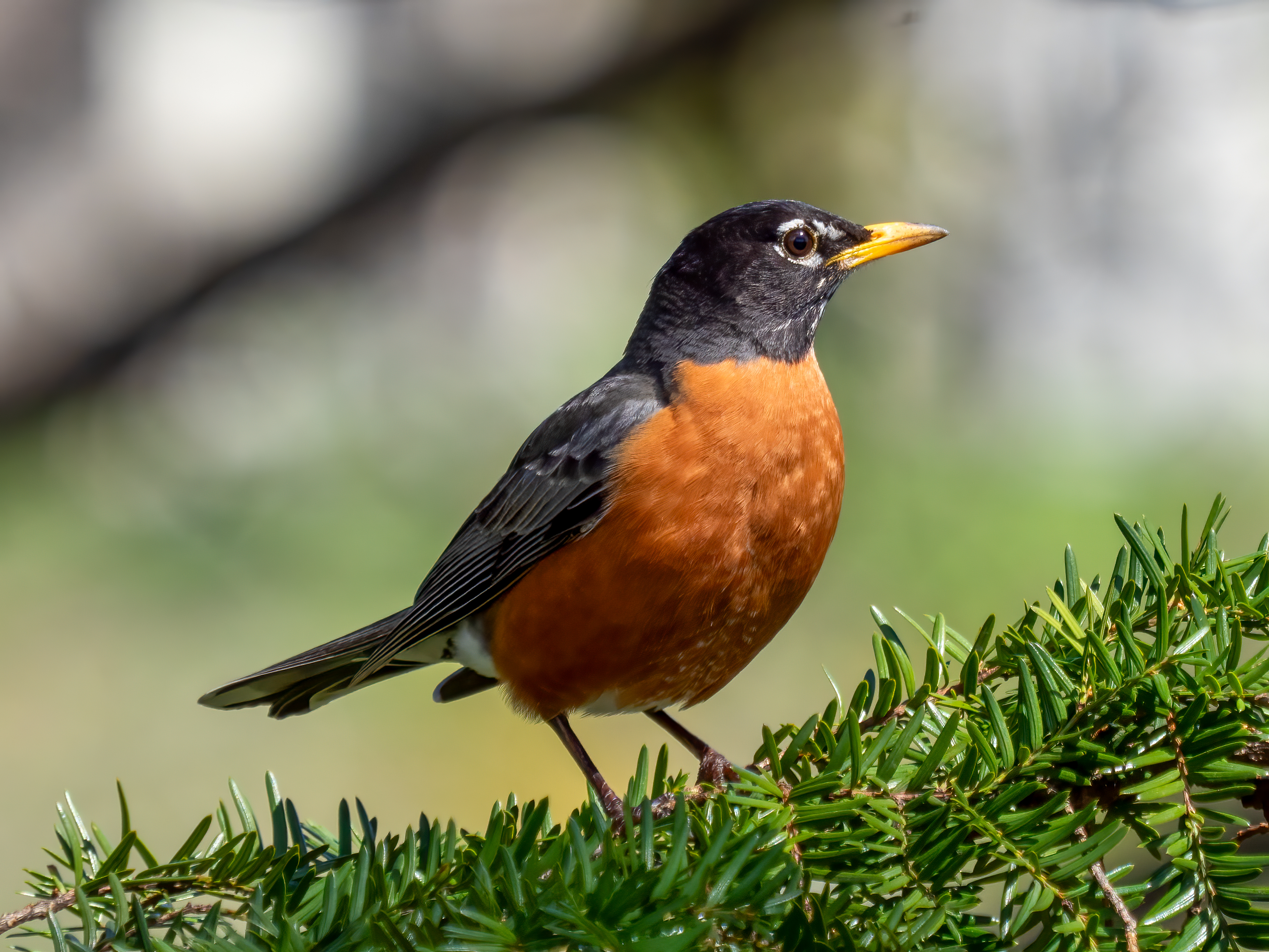
The American robin is a host for L. aztecae
