= Owilfordia =

Scientific classification
- Kingdom: Animalia
- Phylum: Acanthocephala
- Class: Palaeacanthocephala
- Order: Polymorphida
- Family: Plagiorhynchidae
- Genus: Owilfordia; Schmidt & Kuntz, 1967

Genus of thorny-headed worms

Owilfordia is a genus of Acanthocephala (thorny-headed worms, also known as spiny-headed worms) belonging to the family Plagiorhynchidae.

== Taxonomy ==
The genus was described by Schmidt & Kuntz in 1967. The National Center for Biotechnology Information does not indicate that any phylogenetic analysis has been published on any Owilfordia species that would confirm its position as a unique genus in the family Plagiorhynchidae.

== Description ==
Owilfordia species consist of a proboscis covered in hooks and a trunk.

== Species ==
The genus Owilfordiacontains three species.

- Owilfordia olseni Schmidt & Kuntz, 1967
- Owilfordia schmidti Gupta & Fatma, 1988

Parasitizes the small Indian mongoose (Urva auropunctata).

- Owilfordia teliger (Van Cleave, 1949) (Note: A binomial authority in parentheses indicates that the species was originally described in a genus other than Owilfordia . This species was originally named Porrochis teliger by Van Cleave in 1949 but was moved to Owilfordia by Shmidt et Kuntz in 1967.)

== Distribution ==
The distribution of Owilfordia is determined by that of its hosts. O. schmidti was found in hosts (small Indian mongoose) living in Lucknow, India.

== Hosts ==
Life cycle of Acanthocephala. (Note: There are no known aberrant human infections for Owilfordia species.)

The life cycle of an acanthocephalan consists of three stages beginning when an infective acanthor (development of an egg) is released from the intestines of the definitive host and then ingested by an arthropod, the intermediate host. Although the intermediate hosts of Owilfordia are arthropods. When the acanthor molts, the second stage called the acanthella begins. This stage involves penetrating the wall of the mesenteron or the intestine of the intermediate host and growing. The final stage is the infective cystacanth which is the larval or juvenile state of an Acanthocephalan, differing from the adult only in size and stage of sexual development. The cystacanths within the intermediate hosts are consumed by the definitive host, usually attaching to the walls of the intestines, and as adults they reproduce sexually in the intestines. The acanthor is passed in the feces of the definitive host and the cycle repeats. There may be paratenic hosts (hosts where parasites infest but do not undergo larval development or sexual reproduction) for Owilfordia.

Owilfordia parasitizes vertebrates. There are no reported cases of Owilfordia infesting humans in the English language medical literature.

Hosts for Owilfordia species

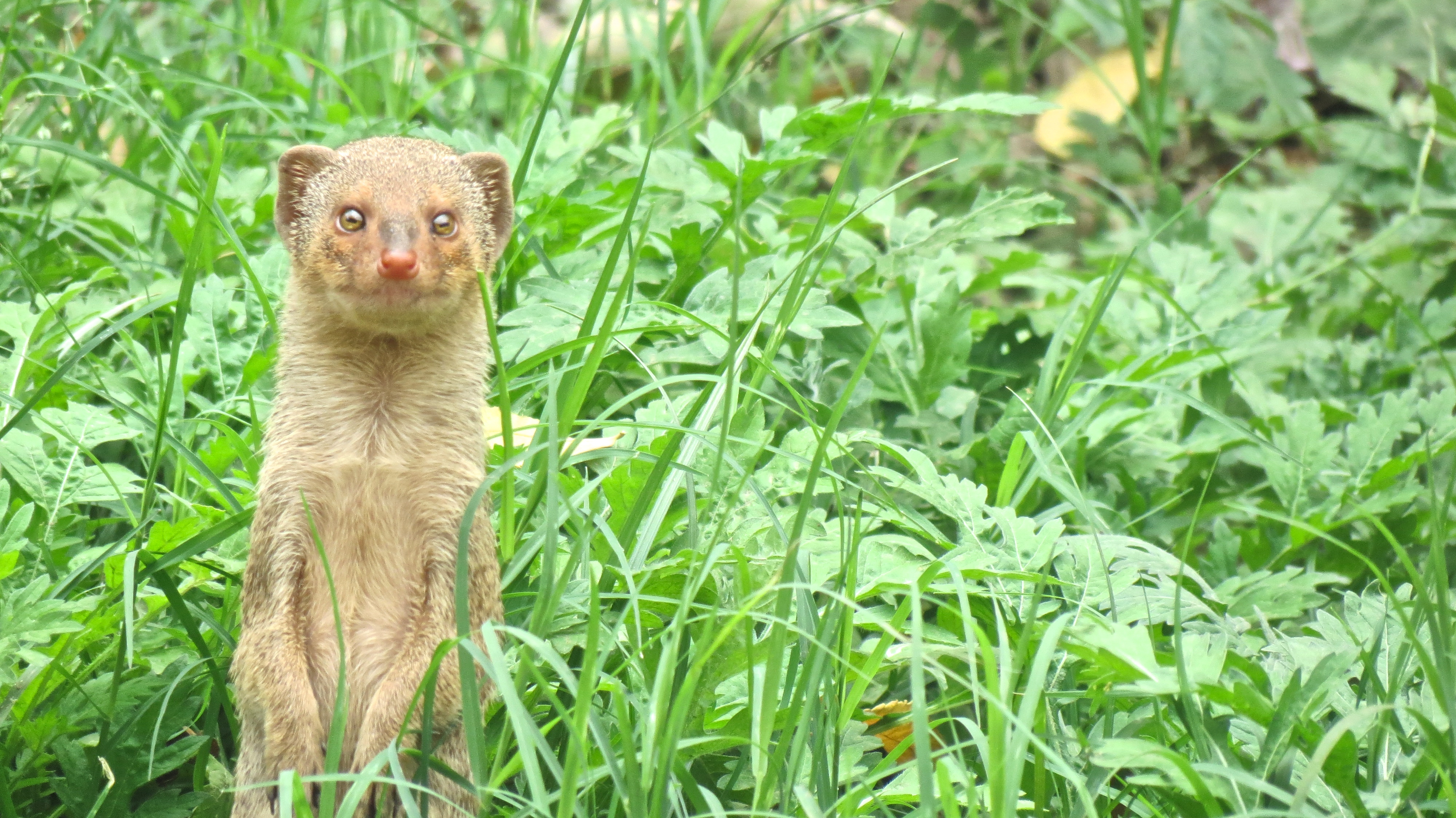
small Indian mongoose (Urva auropunctata).
