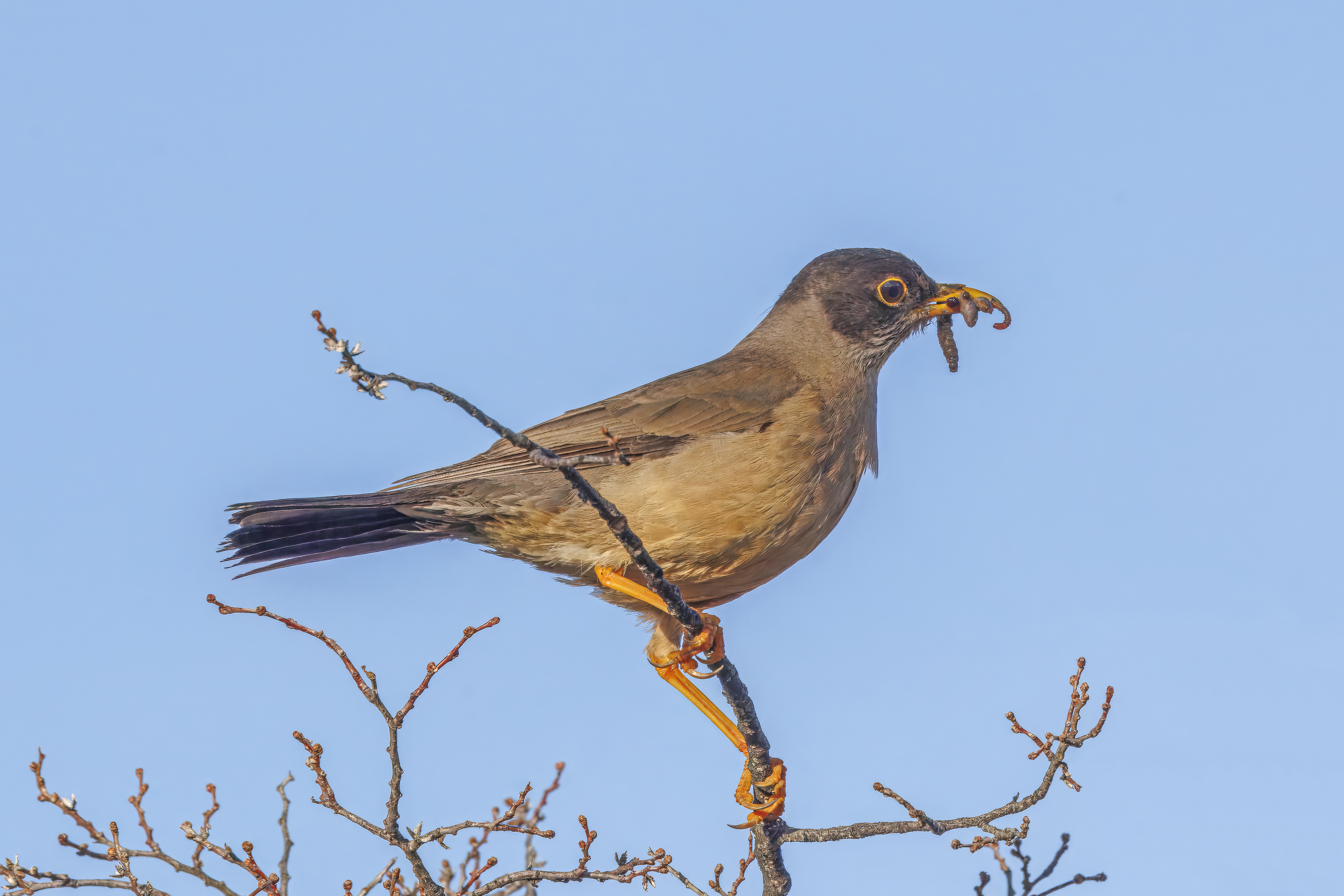
- Torres del Paine, Chile

Conservation status
- Least Concern (IUCN 3.1)

Scientific classification
- Kingdom: Animalia
- Phylum: Chordata
- Class: Aves
- Order: Passeriformes
- Family: Turdidae
- Genus: Turdus
- Species: T. falcklandii

Binomial name
- Turdus falcklandii Quoy & Gaimard, 1824

= Austral thrush =

Species of bird

The austral thrush (Turdus falcklandii) is a species of bird in the family Turdidae. It is found in Argentina, Chile, and the Falkland Islands.

== Taxonomy and systematics ==
The austral thrush was originally described with its current binomial Turdus falcklandii.

The further taxonomy of the austral thrush is unsettled. The IOC, AviList, and BirdLife International's Handbook of the Birds of the World assign it two subspecies, the nominate T. f. falcklandii (Quoy & Gaimard, 1824) and T. f. magellanicus (King, PP, 1831). However, as of late 2025 the Clements taxonomy splits T. f. pembertoni from T. f. magellanicus. Within the species it groups those two as the "austral thrush (Magellan)" and calls T. f. falcklandii the "austral thrush (Falkland).

This article follows the two-subspecies model.

== Description ==
The austral thrush is 23 to 26.5 cm (9.1 to 10 in) long and weighs 95 to 113 g (3.4 to 4.0 oz). The sexes have the same plumage. Adults of the nominate subspecies have a mostly blackish brown head with a thin orange-yellow eye-ring and a buffy and blackish stippled chin and throat. Their upperparts, wings, and tail are warm brownish olive and their underparts ochre. Both sexes have a dark iris and an orange-yellow bill, legs, and feet. Juveniles have the same warm brownish olive upperparts as adults but with heavy buff streaks. Their underparts are buff-yellow with dark brown spots. Subspecies T. f. magellanicus is smaller than the nominate. It has a blacker head, colder olive-brown upperparts, a more distinct throat pattern, and paler underparts.

== Distribution and habitat ==
The nominate subspecies of the austral thrush is found on the Falkland Islands. Subspecies T. f. magellanicus is found on the mainland and adjoining islands from central Chile south to the country's southern tip. In Argentina if is found south to the tip from a line approximately from Neuquén Province to southern Buenos Aires Province, though not along most of the coast. It also is found on Chile's Juan Fernández Islands. The nominate subspecies primarily inhabits areas heavy with tussock grass just inland from rocky beaches. It also occurs in human settlements where structures and vegetation provide shelter and on open slopes and rock outcrops. On the mainland and islands at its southern tip T. f. magellanicus inhabits dense Nothofagus forest, more open forest, plantations, secondary forest, riparian zones, brushlands, and agricultural and human-inhabited areas with trees and bushes. Sources differ on its maximum elevation; one says it is 2,150 m (7,100 ft) and another 3,800 m (12,500 ft).

== Behavior ==
=== Movement ===
The austral thrush is generally sedentary but disperses short distances in winter.

=== Feeding ===
The austral thrush feeds on adult and larval insects, other arthropods, other invertebrates like worms and snails, and fruit. It forages mostly on the ground though takes much fruit in trees. It prefers to forage in soft soil and, in the Falklands, also forages in beached seaweed.

=== Breeding ===
The austral thrush breeds between August and December in the Falklands, where it often fledges three broods and sometimes four in a season. Its nest there is a large deep cup made from grasses and roots with mud or dung and lined with grass or horsehair. It also sometimes incorporates wool and string. It places the nest in a rock crevice, in a dense bush, on a grass tussock, or on a beam in a shed. The clutch is two to three eggs that are blue-green with brown and purple markings. The incubation period is 14 to 16 days and fledging occurs 10 to 11 days after hatch. A new brood is often started within 14 days after a previous one fledges. In Chile subspecies T. f. magellanicus breeds between September and February and in Argentina in at least October and November and probably beyond. Nothing else is known about that subspecies' breeding biology.

=== Vocalization ===
Only male austral thrushes are known to sing. Individuals have a large repertoire consisting of "phrases of whistled and screeching syllables produced at a regular tempo". Older individuals tend to have more songs. The austral thrush is also an accomplished mimic and is known to imitate the songs of at least 12 species including songbirds and raptors. It has at least 10 calls that appear to have distinct functions. The most often heard is the contact call, a "short, low-pitched, up-slurred note". This call differs significantly between the subspecies.

== Status ==
The IUCN has assessed the austral thrush as being of Least Concern. It has a very large range on the mainland and adjoining islands; its population size is not known and is believed to be stable. No immediate threats have been identified. The population in the Falklands is estimated to be 4000 to 8000 pairs. There it is subject to predation by introduced mammals, especially cats, but its high reproductive rate appears to offset the predation. T. f. magellanicus is considered common to abundant in Chile and Argentina.

== Gallery ==
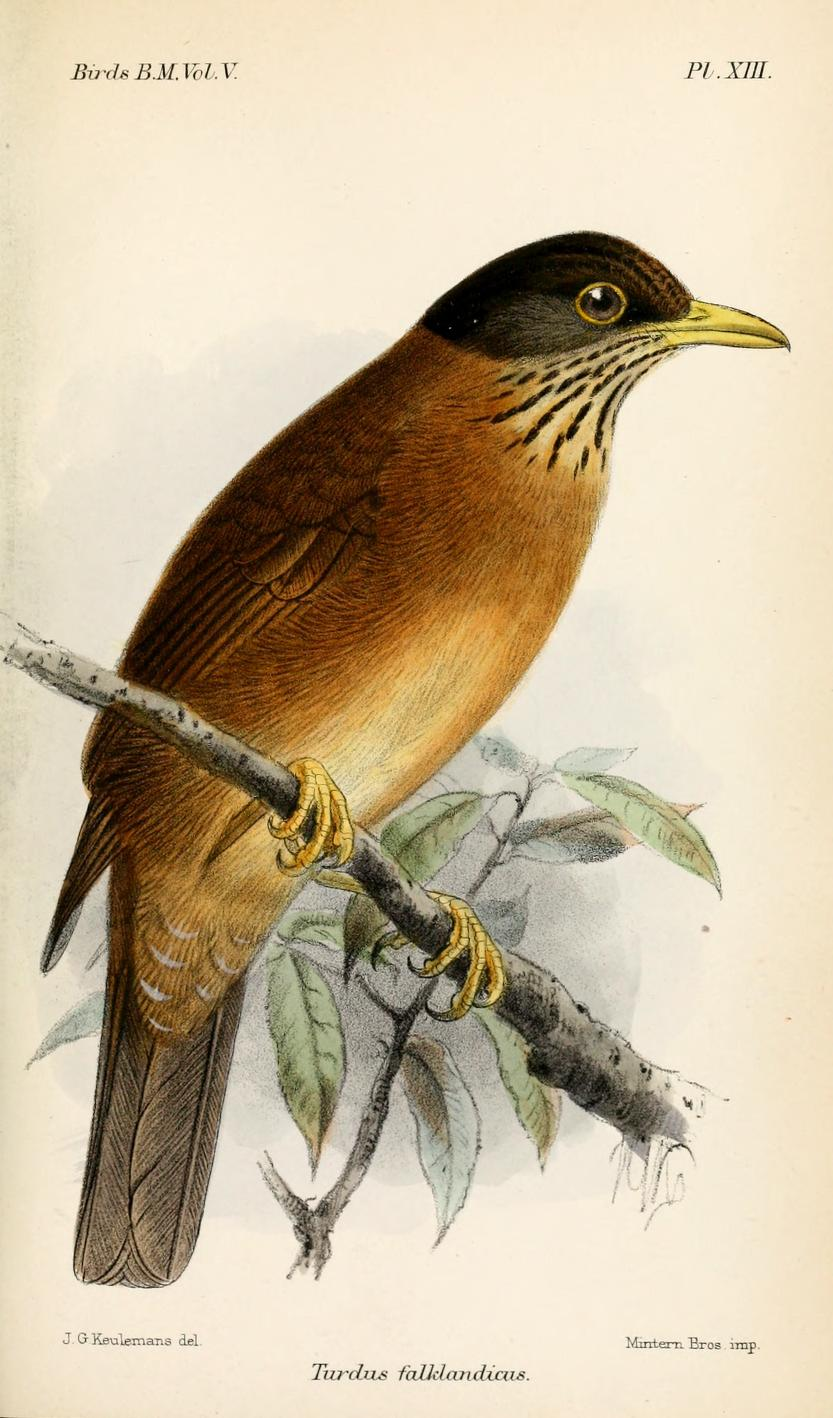
T. f. falcklandii, illustration by Keulemans, 1881

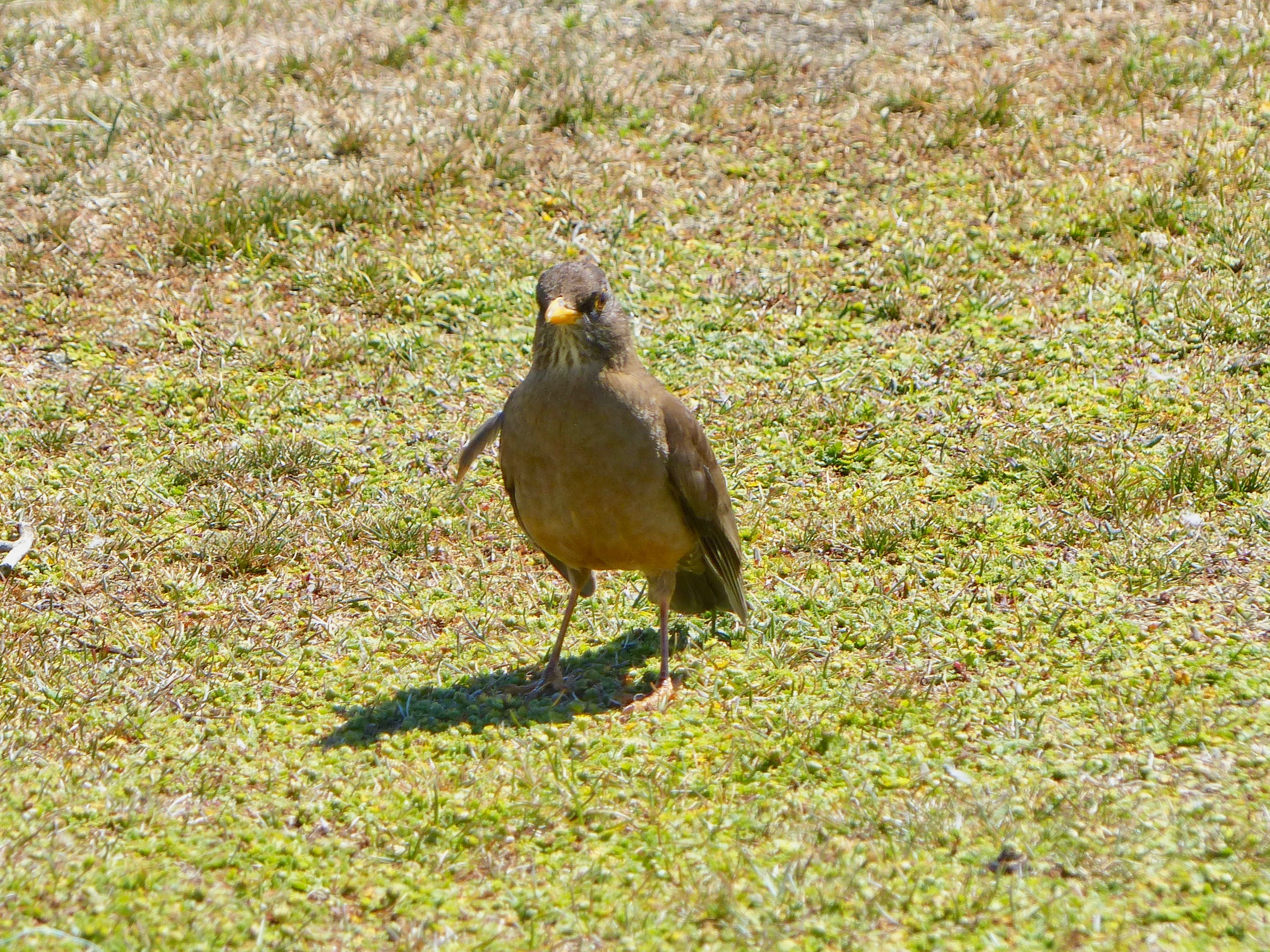
T. f. falcklandii at Gypsy Cove, East Falkland.

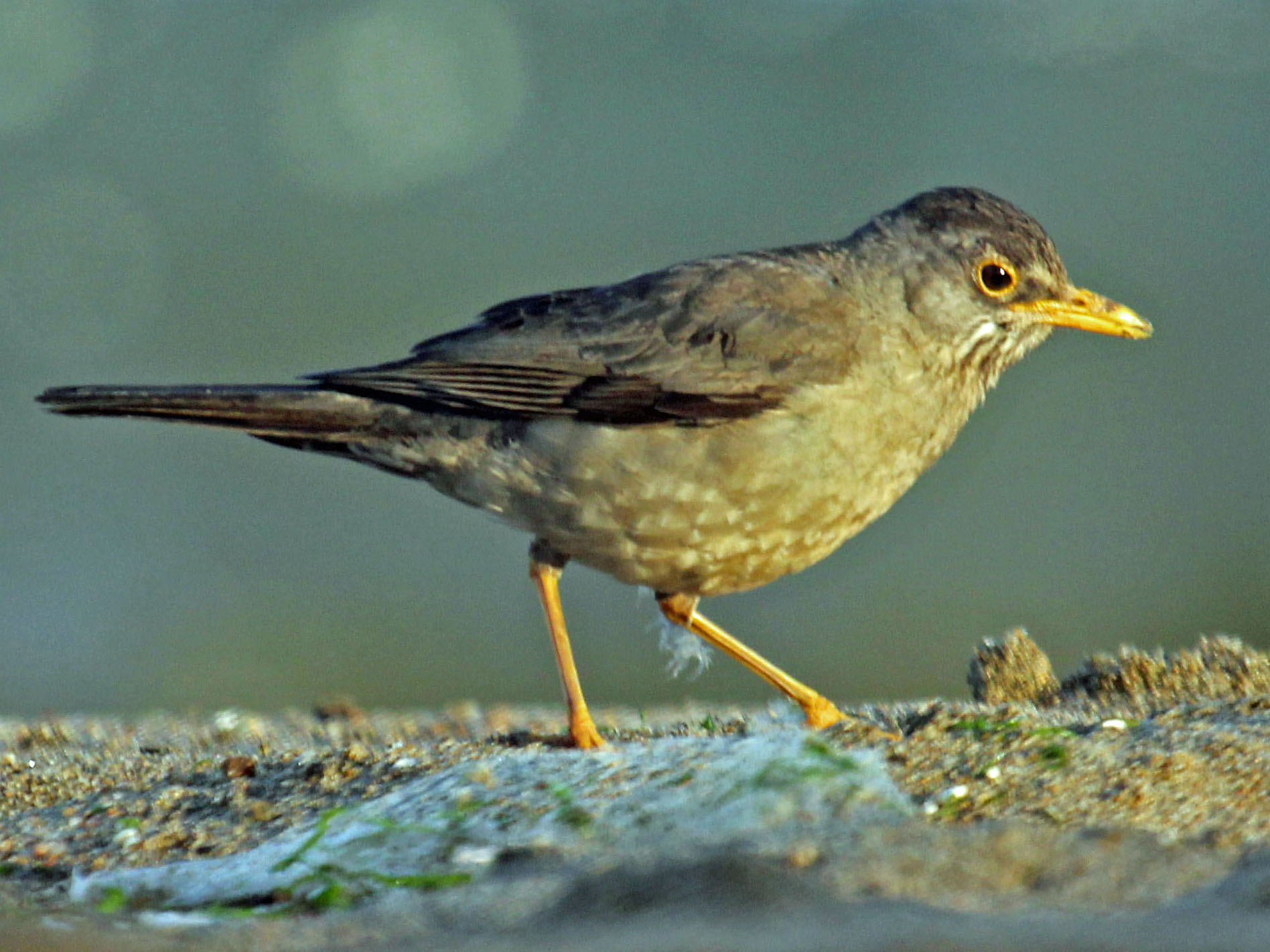
T. f. magellanicus in central Chile
