= Plagiorhynchidae =

Scientific classification
- Kingdom: Animalia
- Phylum: Acanthocephala
- Class: Palaeacanthocephala
- Order: Polymorphida
- Family: Plagiorhynchidae; Golvan, 1960

Family of thorny-headed worms

Plagiorhynchidae is a family of parasitic Acanthocephalan worms.

== Species ==
Genera in Plagiorhynchidae are divided into three subfamilies: Plagiorhynchinae, Porrorchinae, and Sphaerechinorhynchinae. (Note: A binomial authority in parentheses indicates that the species was originally described in a genus other than the present genus.)

=== Plagiorhynchinae Meyer, 1931 ===
==== Paralueheia ====
Paralueheia Saxena & Gupta, 2008 contains only one species, Paralueheia guptai Saxena & Gupta, 2008

==== Plagiorhynchus ====
Species in Plagiorhynchus Lühe, 1911 are divided into two subgenera: Plagiorhynchus and Prosthorhynchus.

- Plagiorhynchus allisonae Smales, 2002
- Plagiorhynchus aznari

P. aznari was found infesting a long-billed curlew (Numenius americanus) from northern Mexico.

- Plagiorhynchus charadrii Yamaguti, 1939)
- Plagiorhynchus charadriicola Dollfus, 1953)
- Plagiorhynchus crassicollis Villot, 1875)
- Plagiorhynchus freitasi Vicente, 1977
- Plagiorhynchus karachiensis Muti-ur-Rahman, Khan, Khatoon and Bilqees, 2008
- Plagiorhynchus lemnisalis Belopolskaya, 1958
- Plagiorhynchus linearis Westrumb, 1821)
- Plagiorhynchus menurae Johnston, 1912)
- Plagiorhynchus odhneri Lundström, 1942
- Plagiorhynchus paulus Van Cleave and Williams, 1950
- Plagiorhynchus pigmentatus de Marval, 1902)
- Plagiorhynchus ponticus Lisitsyna, 1992
- Plagiorhynchus rectus Linton, 1892)
- Plagiorhynchus rosai Porta, 1910)
- Plagiorhynchus rostratus de Marval, 1902)
- Plagiorhynchus totani Porta, 1910)
- Plagiorhynchus urichi Cameron, 1936)

==== Prosthorhynchus ====
Prosthorhynchus Kostylew, 1915 contains many species:

- Plagiorhynchus angrensis Travassos, 1926)
- Plagiorhynchus asturi Gupta and Lata, 1967)
- Plagiorhynchus asymmetricus Belopolskaya, 1983)
- Plagiorhynchus bullocki Schmidt and Kuntz, 1966
- Plagiorhynchus cossyphicola Smales, 2010
- Plagiorhynchus cylindraceus Goeze, 1782)

P. cylindraceus was found infesting the Austral thrush (Turdus falcklandii) in central Chile. Janice Moore discovered P. cylindraceus to be a parasite that infects an intermediate host, the terrestrial isopod Armadillidium vulgare, which alters its behavior and becomes more susceptible to P. cylindraceus' primary host, the European starling (Sturnus vulgaris).

- Plagiorhynchus deysarkari Bhattacharya, 2002
- Plagiorhynchus digiticephalus Amin, Ha and Heckmann, 2008
- Plagiorhynchus gallinagi Schachtachtinskaja, 1953)
- Plagiorhynchus genitopapillatus Lundström, 1942)
- Plagiorhynchus golvani Schmidt and Kuntz, 1966
- Plagiorhynchus gracilis Petrochenko, 1958)
- Plagiorhynchus kuntzi Gupta and Fatma, 1988
- Plagiorhynchus limnobaeni Tubangui, 1933)
- Plagiorhynchus longirostris Travassos, 1926)
- Plagiorhynchus luehei Travassos, 1916)
- Plagiorhynchus malayensis Tubangui, 1935)
- Plagiorhynchus megareceptaclis Amin, Ha and Heckmann, 2008
- Plagiorhynchus nicobarensis Soota and Kansal, 1970)
- Plagiorhynchus ogatai Fukui and Morisita, 1936)
- Plagiorhynchus pittarum Tubangui, 1935)
- Plagiorhynchus reticulatus Westrumb, 1821)
- Plagiorhynchus rheae de Marval, 1902)
- Plagiorhynchus rossicus Kostylew, 1915)
- Plagiorhynchus russelli Tadros, 1970
- Plagiorhynchus schmidti Golvan, 1994)
- Plagiorhynchus scolopacidis Kostylew, 1915)
- Plagiorhynchus transversus Rudolphi, 1819)
- Plagiorhynchus varispinus Wang, 1966)

=== Porrorchinae Golvan, 1956 ===
==== Lueheia ====
Lueheia Travassos, 1919 contains several species:

- Lueheia adlueheia (Werby, 1938)
- Lueheia cajabambensis Machado-Filho and Ibanez, 1967
- Lueheia inscripta (Westrumb, 1821)

L. inscripta was found infesting the Austral thrush (Turdus falcklandii) in central Chile. It has also been found in the Puerto Rican lizard Anolis cristatellus.

- Lueheia karachiensis Khan, Bilqees and Muti-ur-Rahman, 2005
- Lueheia lueheia Travassos, 1919

==== Oligoterorhynchus ====
Oligoterorhynchus Monticelli, 1914 contains one species: Oligoterorhynchus campylurus (Nitzsch, 1857)

==== Owilfordia ====
Owilfordia Schmidt and Kuntz, 1967 contains three species.

- Owilfordia olseni Schmidt and Kuntz, 1967
- Owilfordia schmidti Gupta and Fatma, 1988
- Owilfordia teliger (Van Cleave, 1949)

==== Porrorchis ====
Porrorchis Fukui, 1929 contains many species.

- Porrorchis aruensis Smales, 2010
- Porrorchis bazae (Southwell and Macfie, 1925)
- Porrorchis brevicanthus (Das, 1949)
- Porrorchis centropi (Porta, 1910)
- Porrorchis centropusi (Tubangui, 1933)
- Porrorchis chauhani Gupta and Fatma, 1986
- Porrorchis crocidurai Gupta and Fatma, 1986
- Porrorchis elongatus Fukui, 1929
- Porrorchis heckmanni Bilqees, Khan, Khatoon and Khatoon, 2007
- Porrorchis herpistis Bhattacharya, 2007
- Porrorchis houdemeri (Joyeux and Baer, 1935)
- Porrorchis hydromuris (Edmonds, 1957)
- Porrorchis hylae (Johnston, 1914)
- Porrorchis indicus (Das, 1957)
- Porrorchis jonesae Muti-ur-Rahman, Khan, Khatoon and Bilqees, 2010
- Porrorchis keralensis George and Nadakal, 1984
- Porrorchis kinsellai Lisitsyna, Tkach and Bush, 2012
- Porrorchis leibyi Schmidt and Kuntz, 1967
- Porrorchis maxvachoni (Golvan and Brygoo, 1965)
- Porrorchis nickoli Salgado-Maldonado and Cruz-Reyes, 2002
- Porrorchis oti Yamaguti, 1939
- Porrorchis rotundatus (von Linstow, 1897)
- Porrorchis tyto Amin, Ha and Heckmann, 2008

==== Pseudogordiorhynchus ====
Golvan, 1957

- Pseudogordiorhynchus antonmeyeri Golvan, 1957

==== Pseudolueheia ====
Schmidt and Kuntz, 1967

- Pseudolueheia arunachalensis Bhattacharya, 2007
- Pseudolueheia boreotis (Van Cleave and Williams, 1951)
- Pseudolueheia korathai Gupta and Fatma, 1988
- Pseudolueheia pittae Schmidt and Kuntz, 1967
- Pseudolueheia tongsoni Salcedo and Celis, 2007

=== Sphaerechinorhynchinae Golvan, 1956 ===
==== Sphaerechinorhynchus ====
Johnston, 1929

- Sphaerechinorhynchus macropisthospinus Amin, Wongsawad, Marayong, Saehoong, Suwattanacoupt and Say, 1998

S. macropisthospinus has been found in the intestine of the tiger (Panthera tigris) and a water monitor (Varanus salvator) in Vietnam.

- Sphaerechinorhynchus maximesospinus Amin, Ha and Heckmann, 2008
- Sphaerechinorhynchus ophiograndis Bolette, 1997
- Sphaerechinorhynchus rotundocapitatus (Johnston, 1912)
- Sphaerechinorhynchus serpenticola Schmidt and Kuntz, 1966

== Hosts ==
Plagiorhynchidae species parasitize a variety of hosts.

Hosts for Plagiorhynchidae species

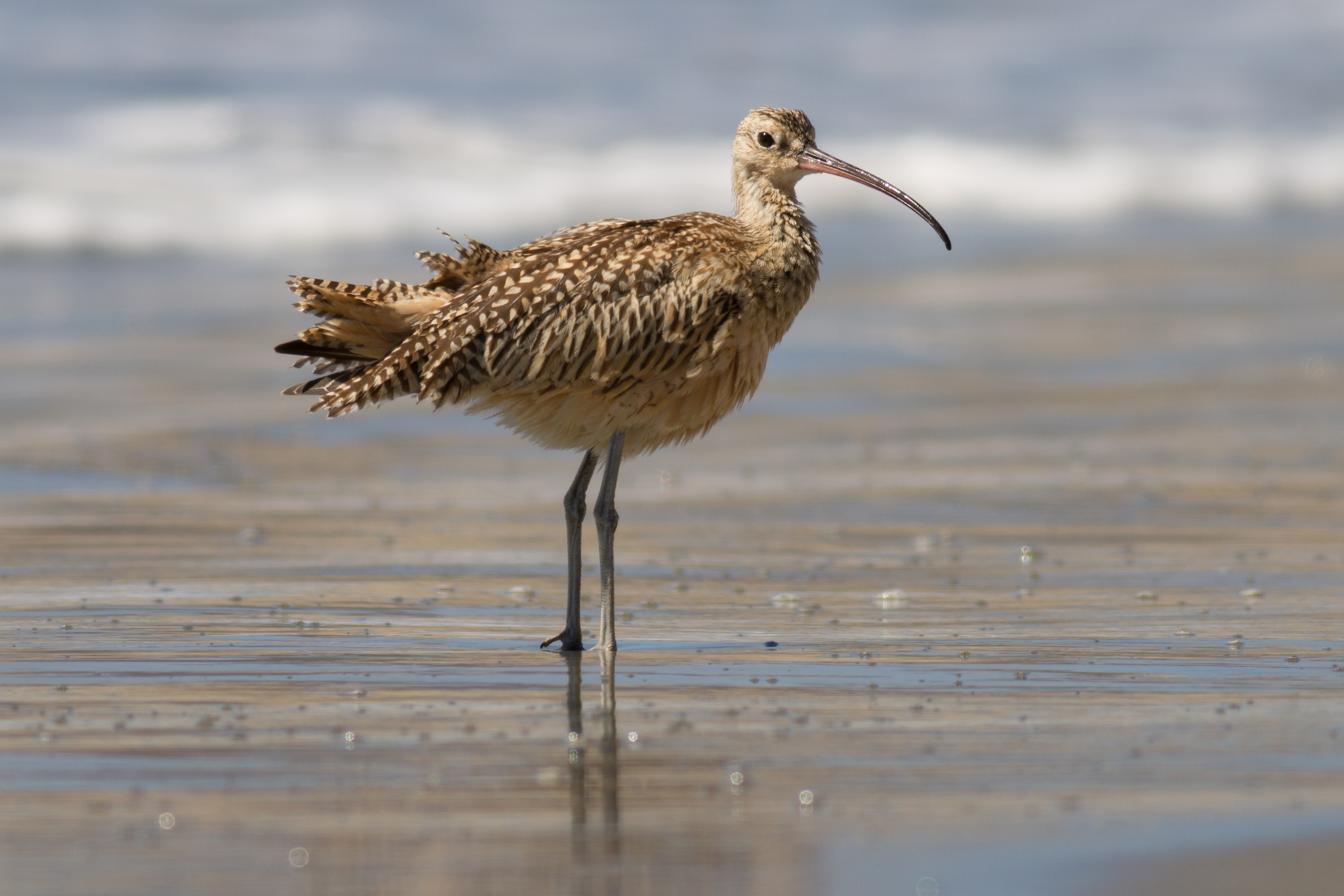
The Long-billed curlew is a hosts of Plagiorhynchus aznari

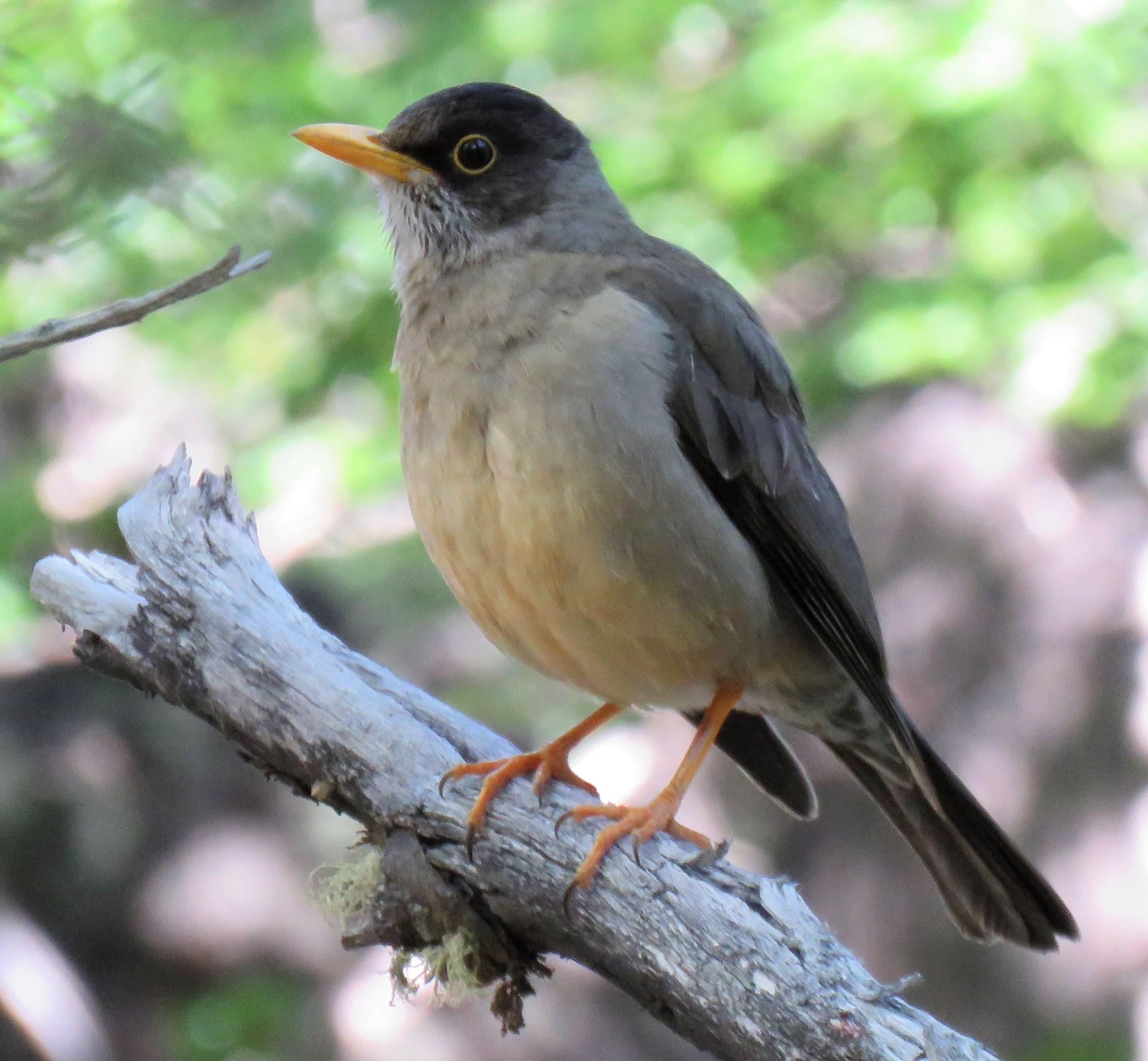
The Austral thrush is a hosts of Plagiorhynchus cylindraceus and Lueheia inscripta

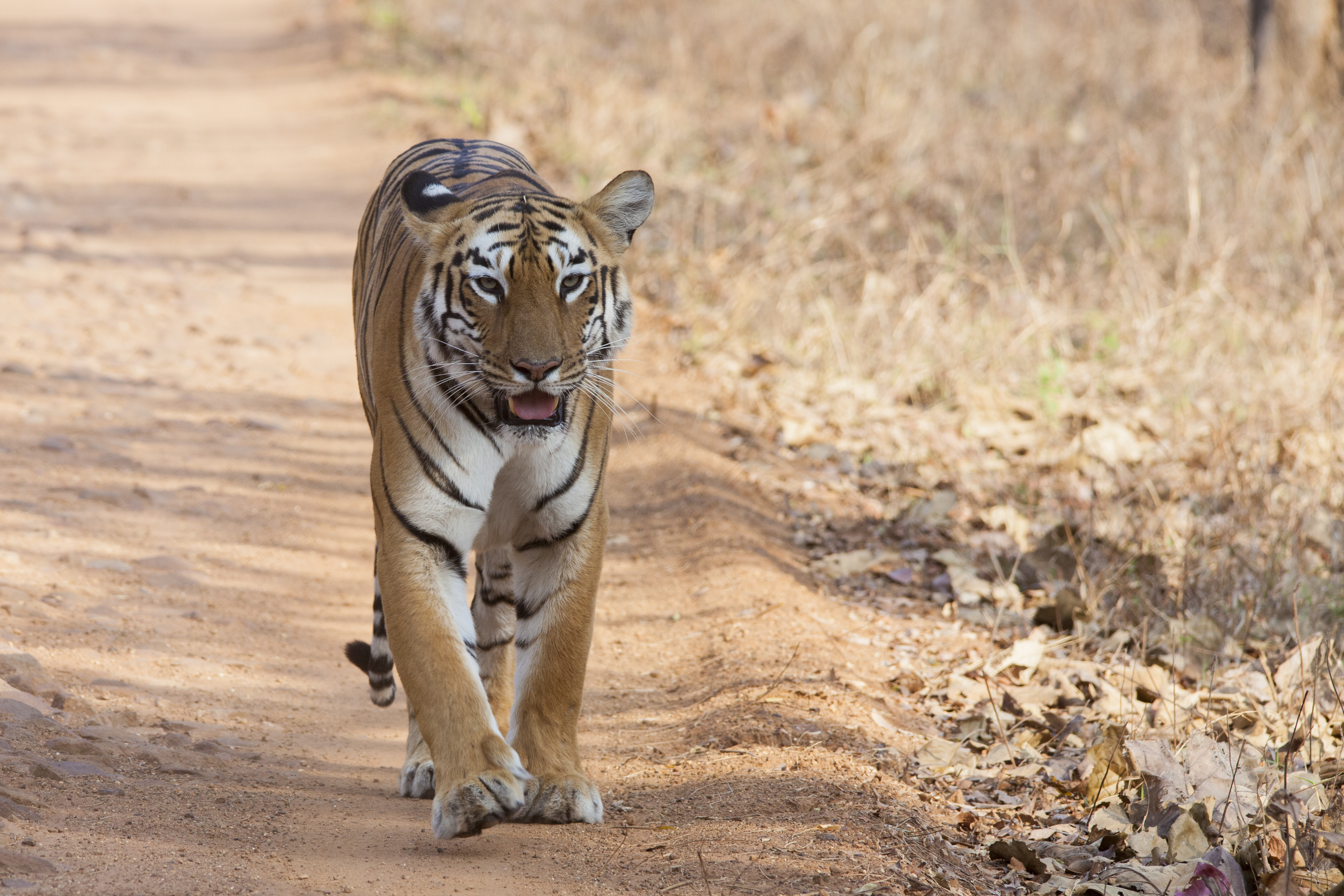
The Tiger is a hosts of Sphaerechinorhynchus macropisthospinus

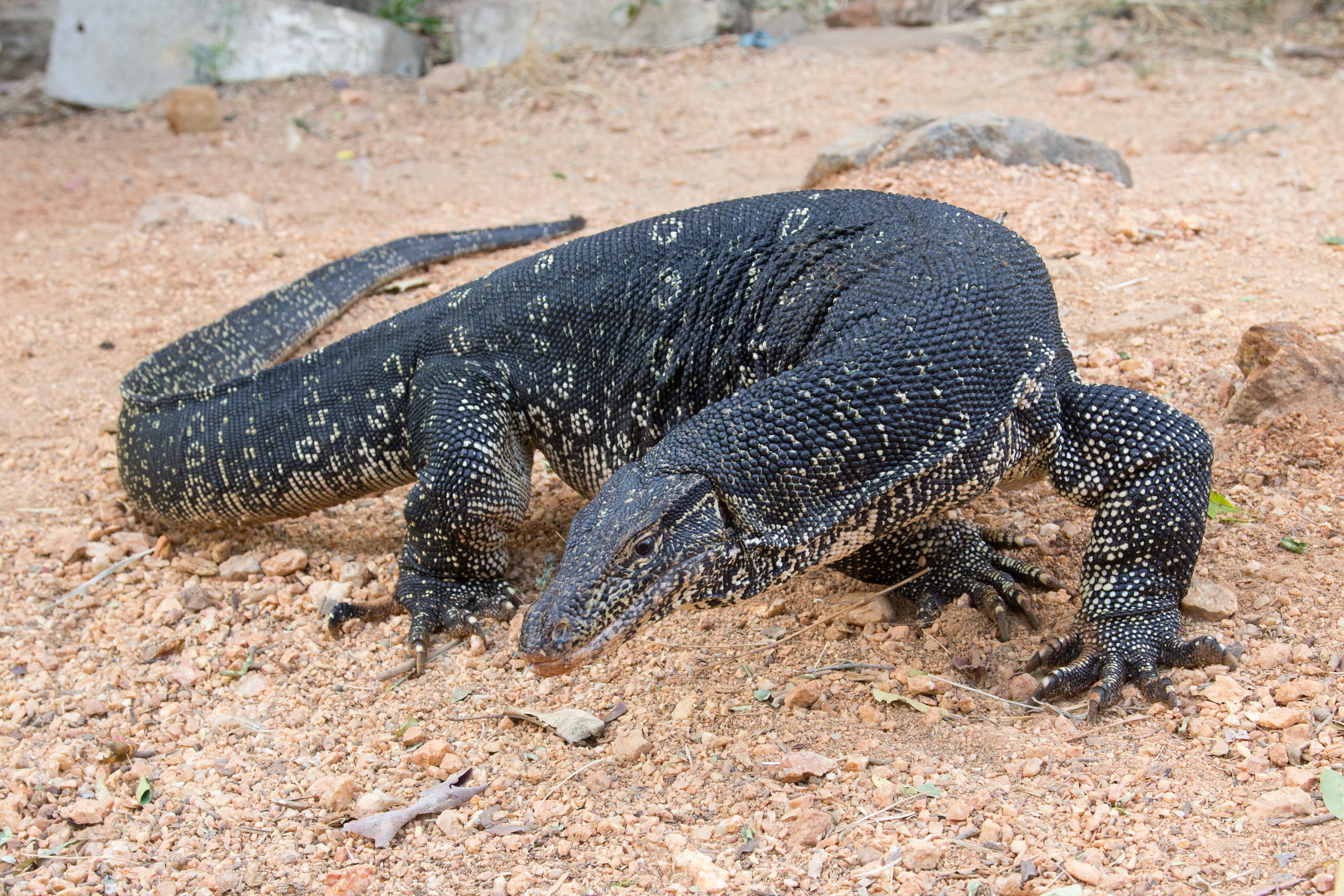
The Asian water monitor is a hosts of Sphaerechinorhynchus macropisthospinus
