= Echinorhynchoides =

Scientific classification
- Kingdom: Animalia
- Phylum: Acanthocephala
- Class: Palaeacanthocephala
- Order: Echinorhynchida
- Family: Cavisomidae
- Genus: Echinorhynchoides; Achmerov and Dombrovskaja-Achmerova, 1941
- Species: E. dogieli

Binomial name
- Echinorhynchoides dogieli Achmerov and Dombrovskaja-Achmerova, 1941

Genus of parasitic worms

Echinorhynchoides is a monotypic genus of acanthocephalans (thorny-headed or spiny-headed parasitic worms) containing a single species, Echinorhynchoides dogieli, that infects animals.

== Taxonomy ==
The species was described by Achmerov and Dombrovskaja-Achmerova in 1941. The National Center for Biotechnology Information does not indicate that any phylogenetic analysis has been published on Echinorhynchoides that would confirm its position as a unique genus in the family Cavisomidae.

== Description ==
Echinorhynchoides dogieli consists of a proboscis covered in hooks and a long trunk.

== Distribution ==
The distribution of Echinorhynchoides dogieli is determined by that of its hosts.

== Hosts ==
Life cycle of Acanthocephala. (Note: There are no known cases of accidental human infection by Echinorhynchoides species.)

The life cycle of an acanthocephalan consists of three stages beginning when an infective acanthor (development of an egg) is released from the intestines of the definitive host and then ingested by an arthropod, the intermediate host. Although the intermediate hosts of Echinorhynchoides are arthropods. When the acanthor molts, the second stage called the acanthella begins. This stage involves penetrating the wall of the mesenteron or the intestine of the intermediate host and growing. The final stage is the infective cystacanth which is the larval or juvenile state of an Acanthocephalan, differing from the adult only in size and stage of sexual development. The cystacanths within the intermediate hosts are consumed by the definitive host, usually attaching to the walls of the intestines, and as adults they reproduce sexually in the intestines. The acanthor is passed in the feces of the definitive host and the cycle repeats. There may be paratenic hosts (hosts where parasites infest but do not undergo larval development or sexual reproduction) for Echinorhynchoides.

Echinorhynchoides dogieli parasitizes animals. There are no reported cases of Echinorhynchoides dogieli infesting humans in the English language medical literature.
