= Megapriapus =

Scientific classification
- Kingdom: Animalia
- Phylum: Acanthocephala
- Class: Palaeacanthocephala
- Order: Echinorhynchida
- Family: Cavisomidae
- Genus: Megapriapus
- Species: M. ungriai

Binomial name
- Megapriapus ungriai (Gracia-Rodrigo, 1960)

Genus of parasitic worms

Megapriapus is a genus of Acanthocephala (thorny-headed or spiny-headed parasitic worms) containing a single known species, Megapriapus ungriai. Found in Venezuela, it infests the freshwater stingray. The genus is described from 12 males and 3 females collected in March 1957. The worms reach up to 25 millimetres (0.98 in) long (mostly trunk) and 1.2 millimetres (0.047 in) wide. There is marked sexual dimorphism in the proboscis and hooks. The body consists of a long, narrow trunk and a tubular proboscis covered with hooks, which is used for feeding and attachment to the intestines of the host.

The life cycle of M. ungriai remains unknown, but in common with other acanthocephalans, it likely involves a complex life cycle with at least two hosts. The intermediate host of Megapriapus has not been definitively identified, but it is believed to be an arthropod, such as an insect. Within this host, the larvae develop into an infectious stage called a cystacanth. When a vertebrate consumes the intermediate host, the cystacanths enter the vertebrate’s intestines where they mature into adult worms and reproduce sexually, and it becomes the definitive host. The resulting eggs are expelled and hatch into new larvae.

== Taxonomy ==
Megapriapus is a genus of acanthocephalans (also called thorny-headed or spiny-headed parasitic worms) containing only the type species, M. ungriai. The genus Megapriapus was circumscribed and species I. ungriai was formally described in 1960 Gracia-Rodrigo in 1960 from 12 males and 3 females collected in March 1957. The name Megapriapus refers to the very large (Mega - Greek for large) penis (Priapus - the Greek God of fertility); ungriai honours Carlos Diaz-Ungria (one of the co-authors of the 1964 revision and a researcher at the Veterinary Institute in Venezuela).

The National Center for Biotechnology Information does not indicate that any phylogenetic analysis has been published on Megapriapus that would confirm its position as a unique genus in the family Cavisomidae.

== Description ==
Anatomical measurements of M. ungriai
Measurement	Female (mm)	Male (mm)
Length of proboscis	–	
Width of proboscis	–	
Length of proboscis receptacle	–	
Width of proboscis receptacle	–	
Length of trunk	–	
Max width of trunk	–	
Cephalic ganglion	–x –	x
Length of lemnisci	–	
Width of lemnisci	–	
Size of eggs	–x –	
Size of testes		x (anterior) x (posterior)
Anterior trunk to anterior testis		

M. ungriai consists of a proboscis (a tubular organ for attachment to the host's intestinal wall). There is pronounced sexual dimorphism.

== Distribution ==
The distribution of M. ungriai is determined by that of its hosts, of which one is known.

== Hosts and pathology ==
Life cycle of Acanthocephala (Note: A 2001 survey of the literature found no known cases of human infection by M. unigriai.)

The specific life cycle of Megapriapus is unknown, but the life cycle of acanthocephala (thorny-headed worms) in general unfolds in three distinct stages. It begins when an egg develops into an infective form known as an acanthor. This acanthor is released with the feces of its definitive host, typically a vertebrate, and must be ingested by an intermediate host, an arthropod such as an insect, to continue its development. Although the specific intermediate hosts for the genus Megapriapus are unidentified, it is generally accepted that insects serve as the primary intermediaries as they make up the diet of the host. Inside the intermediate host, the acanthor molts its outer layer, becoming an acanthella (the immature larval stage). At this stage it burrows into the host's intestinal wall and continues to grow. The life cycle culminates in the formation of a cystacanth, a larval stage able to infect the definitive host while retaining juvenile features (differing from the adult only in size and stage of sexual development), which awaits ingestion by the definitive host to mature fully. Once inside the definitive host, these larvae attach themselves to the intestinal wall using the hooks on their proboscis, mature into sexually reproductive adults, and complete the cycle by releasing new acanthors into the host's feces.

M. unigriai is known to parasitize one species of fish: the stingray, the type host.
