= Femogibbosus =

Scientific classification
- Kingdom: Animalia
- Phylum: Acanthocephala
- Class: Palaeacanthocephala
- Order: Echinorhynchida
- Family: Cavisomidae
- Genus: Femogibbosus; Paruchin, 1973
- Species: F. assi

Binomial name
- Femogibbosus assi Paruchin, 1973

Genus of parasitic worms

Femogibbosus is a monotypic genus of acanthocephalans (thorny-headed or spiny-headed parasitic worms) containing a single species, Femogibbosus assi, that infests animals.

== Taxonomy ==
The species was described by Paruchin in 1973. The National Center for Biotechnology Information does not indicate that any phylogenetic analysis has been published on Femogibbosus that would confirm its position as a unique order in the family Cavisomidae.

== Description ==
F. assi consists of a proboscis covered in hooks and a trunk. It differs from Rhadinorhynchoides by having 14 rows of hooks (with 10 hooks in each row), the shape of the cement glands, and the arrangement of the testes.

== Distribution ==
The distribution of F. assi is determined by that of its hosts. It was found off the Oman coast in the Indian Ocean.

== Hosts ==
Life cycle of Acanthocephala. (Note: There are no known aberrant human infections for F. assi species.)

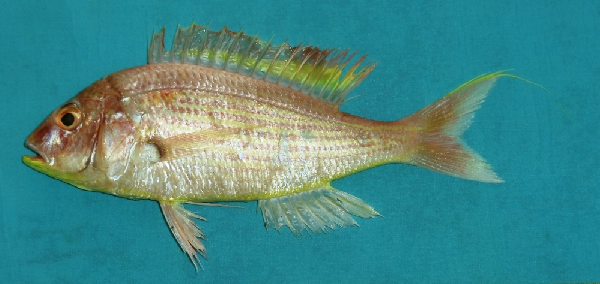
Nemipterus japonicus is the host of F. assi

The life cycle of an acanthocephalan consists of three stages beginning when an infective acanthor (development of an egg) is released from the intestines of the definitive host and then ingested by an arthropod, the intermediate host. Although the intermediate hosts of Femogibbosus are ???. When the acanthor molts, the second stage called the acanthella begins. This stage involves penetrating the wall of the mesenteron or the intestine of the intermediate host and growing. The final stage is the infective cystacanth which is the larval or juvenile state of an Acanthocephalan, differing from the adult only in size and stage of sexual development. The cystacanths within the intermediate hosts are consumed by the definitive host, usually attaching to the walls of the intestines, and as adults they reproduce sexually in the intestines. The acanthor is passed in the feces of the definitive host and the cycle repeats. There may be paratenic hosts (hosts where parasites infest but do not undergo larval development or sexual reproduction) for Femogibbosus.

Femogibbosus assi was found in the intestine of Nemipterus japonicus. There are no reported cases of F. assi infesting humans in the English language medical literature.
