= Caballerorhynchus =

Scientific classification
- Kingdom: Animalia
- Phylum: Acanthocephala
- Class: Palaeacanthocephala
- Order: Echinorhynchida
- Family: Cavisomidae
- Genus: Caballerorhynchus; Salgado-Maldonado, 1977
- Species: C. lamothei

Binomial name
- Caballerorhynchus lamothei Salgado-Maldonado, 1977

Genus of parasitic worms

Caballerorhynchus is a monotypic genus of acanthocephalans (thorny-headed or spiny-headed parasitic worms) containing a single species, Caballerorhynchus lamothei, that infests animals.

== Taxonomy ==
The species was described by Salgado-Maldonado in 1977. The National Center for Biotechnology Information does not indicate that any phylogenetic analysis has been published on Caballerorhynchus that would confirm its position as a unique order in the family Cavisomidae. It has been suggested that the genus be moved to Rhadinorhynchidae due to their morophological similarities.

== Description ==
C. lamothei consists of a proboscis covered in hooks arranged in three circles with six hooks in each circle, a proboscis receptacle, and a trunk. It is distinguished from other genera of Cavisomidae through several morphological traits including the location of the testes (away from posterior extremity).

== Distribution ==
The distribution of C. lamothei is determined by that of its hosts. It was found in the Sontecomapan Lagoon located in Veracruz, Mexico. It is found in other locations.

== Hosts ==
Life cycle of Acanthocephala. (Note: There are no known aberrant human infections for C. lamothei species.)

The life cycle of an acanthocephalan consists of three stages beginning when an infective acanthor (development of an egg) is released from the intestines of the definitive host and then ingested by an arthropod, the intermediate host. An intermediate host of Caballerorhynchus is Discapseudes holthuisi. When the acanthor molts, the second stage called the acanthella begins. This stage involves penetrating the wall of the mesenteron or the intestine of the intermediate host and growing. The final stage is the infective cystacanth which is the larval or juvenile state of an Acanthocephalan, differing from the adult only in size and stage of sexual development. The cystacanths within the intermediate hosts are consumed by the definitive host, usually attaching to the walls of the intestines, and as adults they reproduce sexually in the intestines. The acanthor are passed in the feces of the definitive host and the cycle repeats. There may be paratenic hosts (hosts where parasites infest but do not undergo larval development or sexual reproduction) for Caballerorhynchus.

C. lamothei parasitizes the Irish mojarra (Diapterus auratus). It was also found in Diapterus rhombeus, Eugerres plumieri and the southern catfish. There are no reported cases of C. lamothei infesting humans in the English language medical literature.

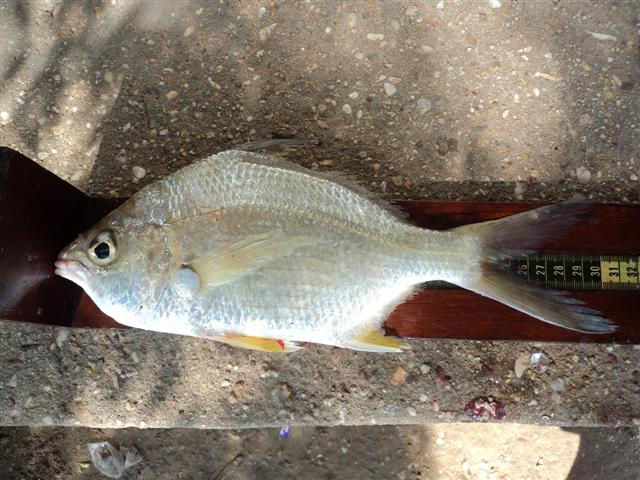
The Irish mojarra is the host for C. lamothei
