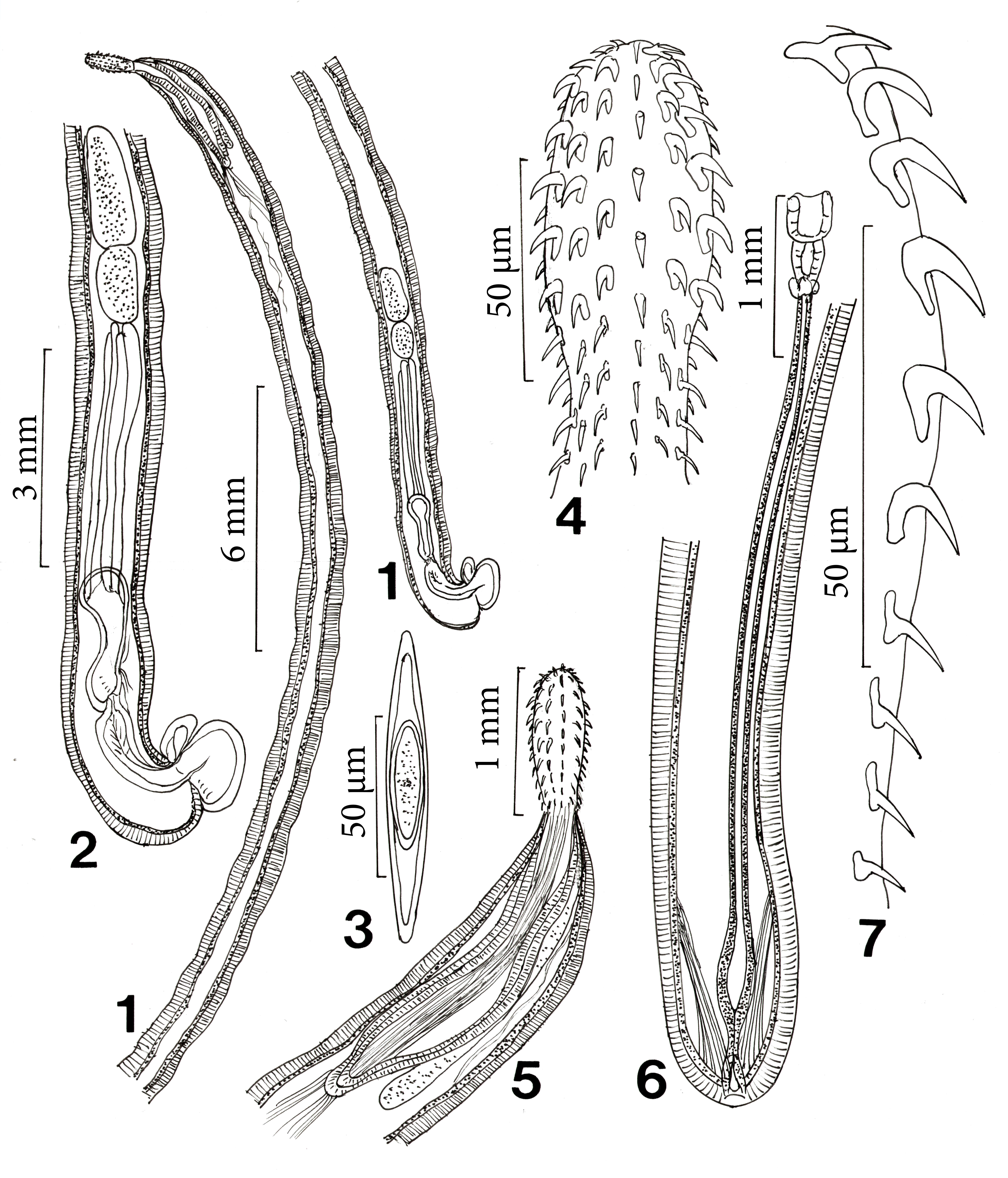
- Cavisoma magnum

Scientific classification
- Kingdom: Animalia
- Phylum: Acanthocephala
- Class: Palaeacanthocephala
- Order: Echinorhynchida
- Family: Cavisomidae; Meyer, 1932

= Cavisomidae =

Family of thorny-headed worms

Cavisomidae are a family of parasitic worms from the order Echinorhynchida.

== Species ==
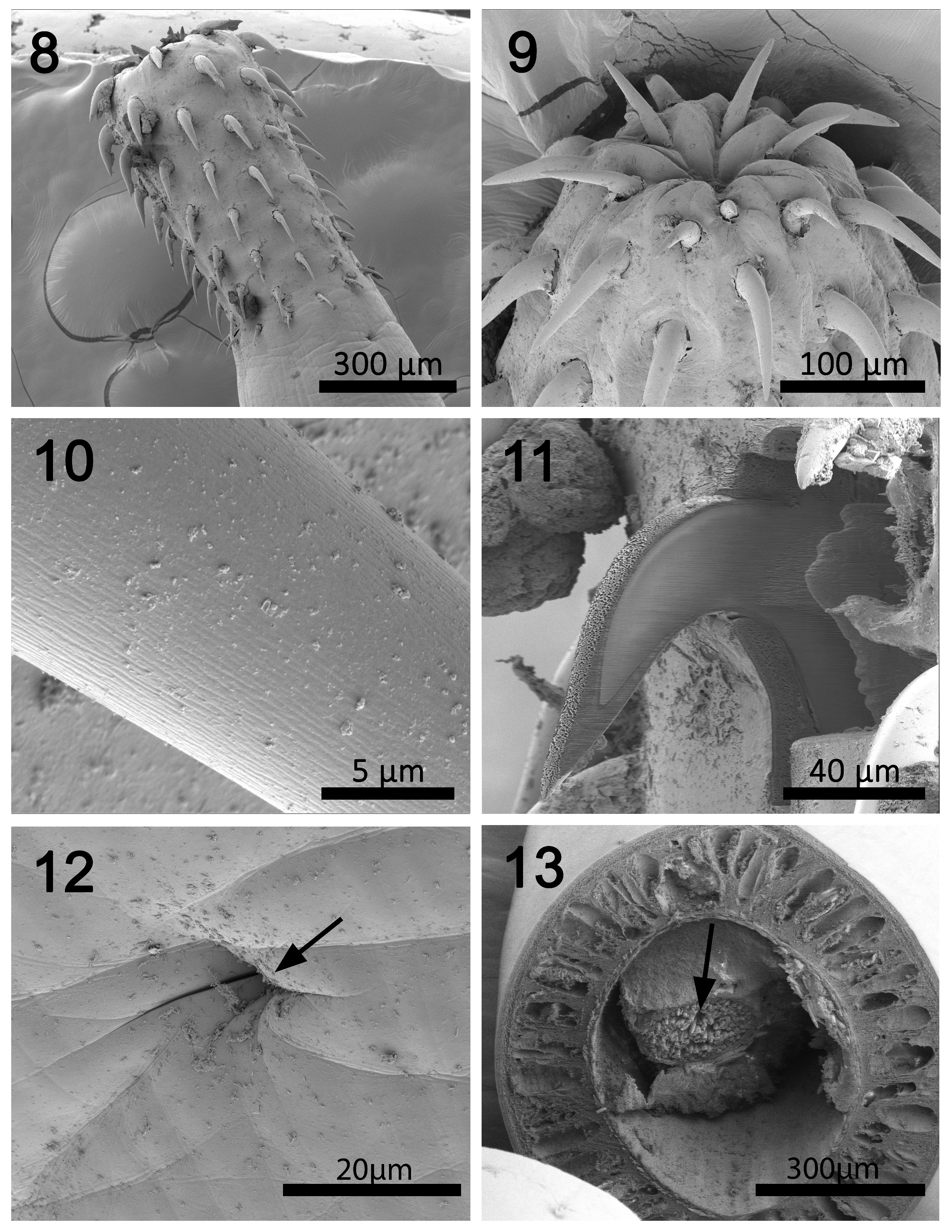
Cavisoma magnum, scanning electron microscopy

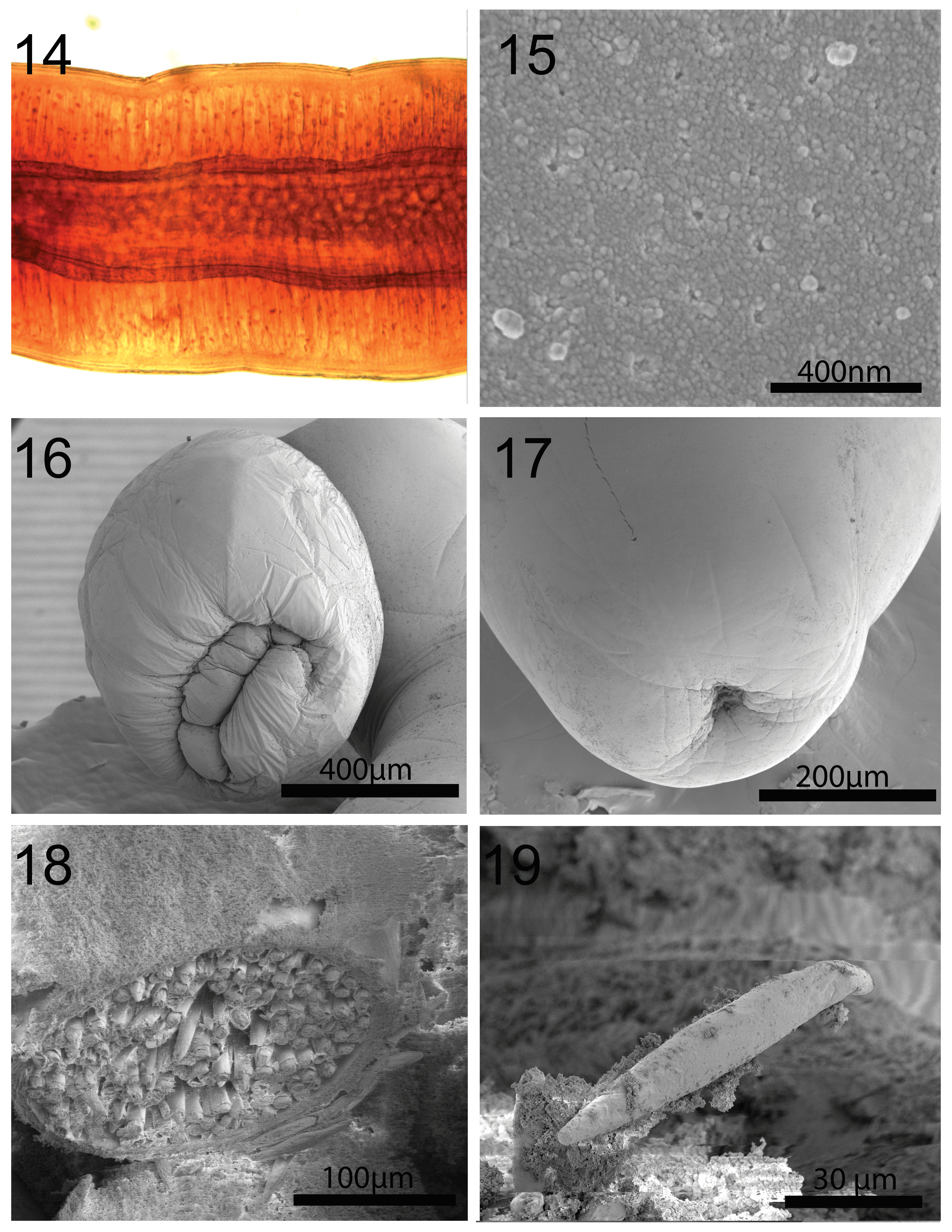
Cavisoma magnum, mainly scanning electron microscopy

Cavisomidae contains ten genera: (Note: A binomial authority in parentheses indicates that the species was originally described in a genus other than the present genus.)

=== Caballerorhynchus ===
Caballerorhynchus Salgado-Maldonado, 1977 contains one species:

- Caballerorhynchus lamothei Salgado-Maldonado, 1977

=== Cavisoma ===
Cavisoma Van Cleave, 1931 contains one species:

- Cavisoma magnum (Southwell, 1927)

C. magnum (Southwell, 1927) Van Cleave, 1931 was originally described as Oligoterorhynchus magnus by Southwell from the stomach and pyloric ceca of the sea bass, Serranus sp. (Serranidae) and from another fish, the spotted surgeonfish Ctenochaetus strigosus (Acanthuridae) off Negapatam, (Sri Lanka). Other hosts include milkfish Chanos chanos (Chanidae), Siganus lineatus (Siganidae), and Grey mullet, Mugil cephalus (Mugilidae). Localities include Sri Lanka, the Red Sea, the Philippines, New Caledonia, and Iraq.

=== Echinorhynchoides ===
Echinorhynchoides Achmerov and Dombrovskaja-Achmerova, 1941 contains one species:

- Echinorhynchoides dogieli Achmerov and Dombrovskaja-Achmerova, 1941

=== Femogibbosus ===
Femogibbosus Paruchin, 1973 contains only one species, Femogibbosus assi Paruchin, 1973.

=== Filisoma ===
Filisoma Van Cleave, 1928 contains many species:

- Filisoma acanthocybii Wang, Wang & Wu, 1993
- Filisoma atropi Wang and Wang, 1988
- Filisoma bucerium Van Cleave, 1940
- Filisoma fidum Van Cleve & Manter, 1947
- Filisoma filiformis Weaver & Smales, 2013
- Filisoma indicum Van Cleave, 1928
- Filisoma inglisi Gupta & Naqvi, 1986
- Filisoma longcementglandatus Amin & Nahhas, 1994
- Filisoma micracanthi Harada, 1938
- Filisoma oplegnathi Wang & Wang, 1988
- Filisoma rizalinum Tubangui & Masiluñgan, 1946
- Filisoma scatophagusi Datta & Soota, 1962

=== Megapriapus ===
Megapriapus Golvan, Gracia-Rodrigo and Diaz-Ungria, 1964 contains one species:

- Megapriapus ungriai (Gracia-Rodrigo, 1960)

=== Neorhadinorhynchus ===
Neorhadinorhynchus Yamaguti, 1939 contains many species:

- Neorhadinorhynchus aspinosus (Fukui and Morisita, 1937)
- Neorhadinorhynchus atlanticus Gaevskaja & Nigmatulin, 1977
- Neorhadinorhynchus atypicalis Amin & Ha, 2011
- Neorhadinorhynchus macrospinosus Amin & Nahhas, 1994
- Neorhadinorhynchus madagascariensis Golvan, 1969
- Neorhadinorhynchus myctophumi Mordvilkova, 1988
- Neorhadinorhynchus nudus (Harada, 1938)

=== Paracavisoma ===
Paracavisoma Kritscher, 1957 contains one species:

- Paracavisoma impudica (Diesing, 1851)

=== Pseudocavisoma ===
Pseudocavisoma Golvan & Houin, 1964 contains one species

- Pseudocavisoma chromitidis (Cable and Quick, 1954) Golvan & Houin, 1964

=== Rhadinorhynchoides ===
Rhadinorhynchoides Fukui and Morisita, 1937 contains one species

- Rhadinorhynchoides miyagawai Fukui and Morisita, 1937

== Hosts ==
Cavisomidae species parasitize fish.

Hosts for Cavisomidae species

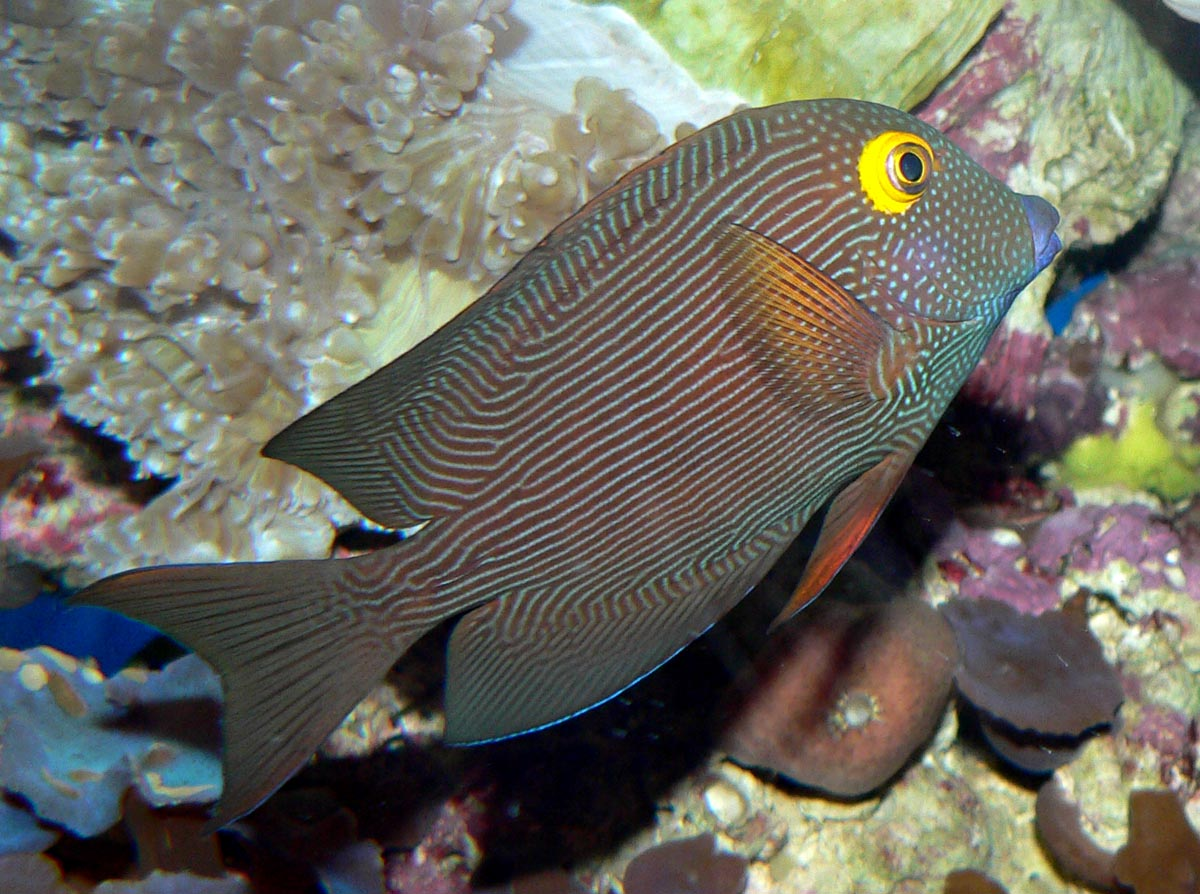
The kole tang is a host of Cavisoma magnum
