= Rhadinorhynchoides =

Scientific classification
- Kingdom: Animalia
- Phylum: Acanthocephala
- Class: Palaeacanthocephala
- Order: Echinorhynchida
- Family: Cavisomidae
- Genus: Rhadinorhynchoides; Fukui and Morisita, 1937
- Species: R. miyagawai

Binomial name
- Rhadinorhynchoides miyagawai Fukui and Morisita, 1937

Genus of parasitic worms

Rhadinorhynchoides is a monotypic genus of acanthocephalans (thorny-headed or spiny-headed parasitic worms) containing a single species, Rhadinorhynchoides miyagawai, that infests animals.

== Taxonomy ==
The species was described by Fukui and Morisita, 1937. The National Center for Biotechnology Information does not indicate that any phylogenetic analysis has been published on Rhadinorhynchoides that would confirm its position as a unique genus in the family Cavisomidae.

== Description ==
Rhadinorhynchoides miyagawai consists of a proboscis covered in hooks and a long trunk. The genus can be defined by the following characteristics: testes located away from the posterior extremity, a cylindrical proboscis with a ganglion near its middle, a proboscis receptacle with cement glands positioned at the same level, and lemnisci that are equal to or shorter than the length of the proboscis receptacle.

== Distribution ==
The distribution of Rhadinorhynchoides miyagawai is determined by that of its hosts.

== Hosts ==
Life cycle of Acanthocephala. (Note: There are no known aberrant human infections for Rhadinorhynchoides miyagawai species.)

The life cycle of an acanthocephalan consists of three stages beginning when an infective acanthor (development of an egg) is released from the intestines of the definitive host and then ingested by an arthropod, the intermediate host. Although the intermediate hosts of Rhadinorhynchoides are arthropods. When the acanthor molts, the second stage called the acanthella begins. This stage involves penetrating the wall of the mesenteron or the intestine of the intermediate host and growing. The final stage is the infective cystacanth which is the larval or juvenile state of an Acanthocephalan, differing from the adult only in size and stage of sexual development. The cystacanths within the intermediate hosts are consumed by the definitive host, usually attaching to the walls of the intestines, and as adults they reproduce sexually in the intestines. The acanthor is passed in the feces of the definitive host and the cycle repeats. There may be paratenic hosts (hosts where parasites infest but do not undergo larval development or sexual reproduction) for Rhadinorhynchoides.

Rhadinorhynchoides miyagawai parasitizes freshwater fishes. There are no reported cases of Rhadinorhynchoides miyagawai infesting humans in the English language medical literature.

Hosts for Rhadinorhynchoides miyagawai
