= Cavisoma =

Scientific classification
- Kingdom: Animalia
- Phylum: Acanthocephala
- Class: Palaeacanthocephala
- Order: Echinorhynchida
- Family: Cavisomidae
- Genus: Cavisoma; Van Cleave, 1931
- Species: C. magnum

Binomial name
- Cavisoma magnum (Southwell, 1927)

Genus of parasitic worms

Cavisoma is a monotypic genus of acanthocephalans (thorny-headed or spiny-headed parasitic worms) containing a single species, Cavisoma magnum, that infests animals.

== Taxonomy ==
C. magnum (Southwell, 1927) was originally described as Oligoterorhynchus magnus by Southwell in 1927 It was brought to the Cavisoma genus by Van Cleave in 1931. The National Center for Biotechnology Information does indicate that a phylogenetic analysis has been published on the mitochondrial DNA of Cavisoma.

== Description ==
Cavisoma magnum consists of a proboscis covered in hooks and a trunk.

== Distribution ==
The distribution of Cavisoma magnum is determined by that of its hosts. Localities include Sri Lanka, the Red Sea, the Philippines, New Caledonia, and Iraq.

== Hosts ==
Life cycle of Acanthocephala. (Note: There are no known aberrant human infections for Cavisoma magnum species.)

The life cycle of an acanthocephalan consists of three stages beginning when an infective acanthor (development of an egg) is released from the intestines of the definitive host and then ingested by an arthropod, the intermediate host. Although the intermediate hosts of Cavisoma are arthropods. When the acanthor molts, the second stage called the acanthella begins. This stage involves penetrating the wall of the mesenteron or the intestine of the intermediate host and growing. The final stage is the infective cystacanth which is the larval or juvenile state of an Acanthocephalan, differing from the adult only in size and stage of sexual development. The cystacanths within the intermediate hosts are consumed by the definitive host, usually attaching to the walls of the intestines, and as adults they reproduce sexually in the intestines. The acanthor is passed in the feces of the definitive host and the cycle repeats. There may be paratenic hosts (hosts where parasites infest but do not undergo larval development or sexual reproduction) for Cavisoma.

Cavisoma magnum was found in the stomach and pyloric ceca of the sea bass, Serranus sp. (Serranidae) and from another fish, the spotted surgeonfish Ctenochaetus strigosus (Acanthuridae) off Negapatam, (Sri Lanka). Other hosts include milkfish Chanos chanos (Chanidae), Siganus lineatus (Siganidae), and Grey mullet, Mugil cephalus (Mugilidae). There are no reported cases of Cavisoma magnum infesting humans in the English language medical literature.

Hosts for Cavisoma magnum

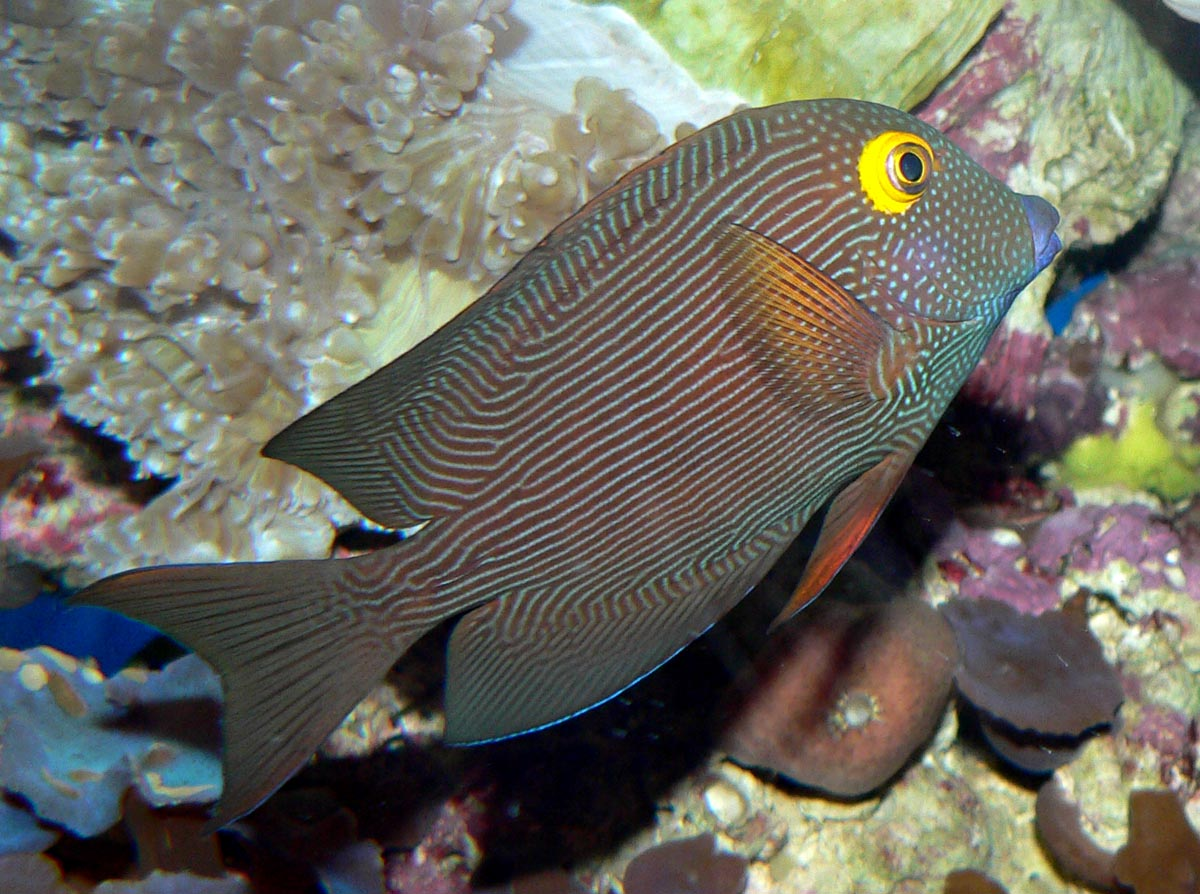
The Goldring Bristletooth is a host

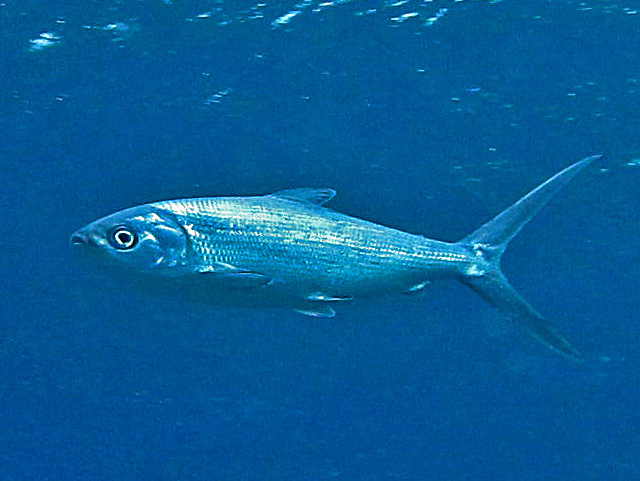
The Milkfish is a host

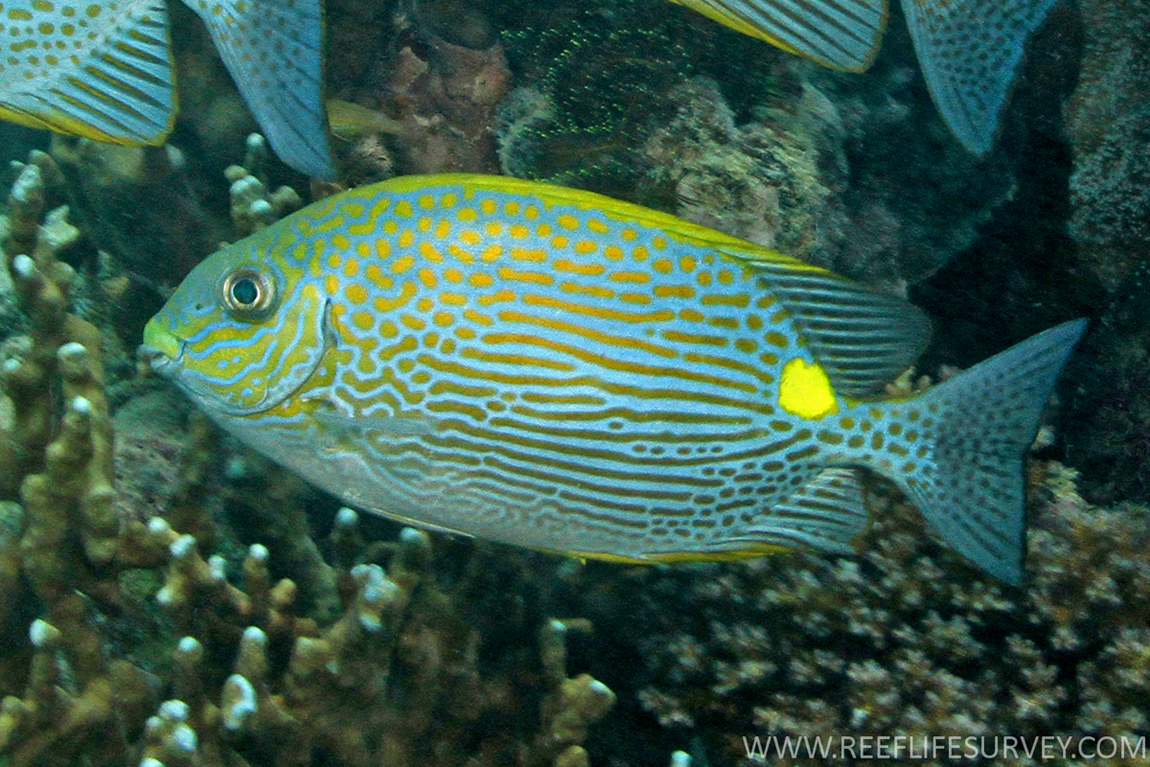
The Golden-lined spinefoot is a host

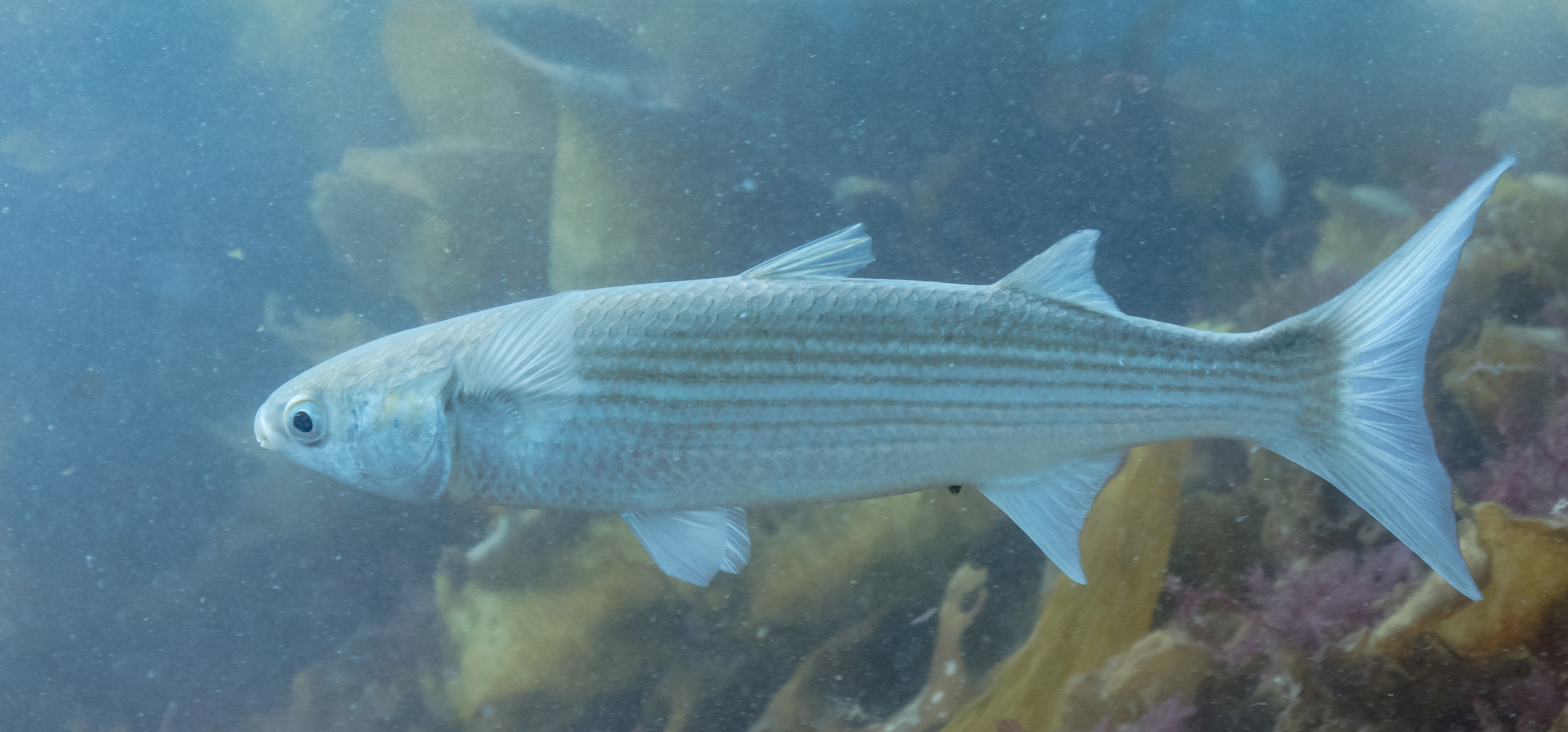
The Flathead grey mullet is a host
