= Filisoma =

Scientific classification
- Kingdom: Animalia
- Phylum: Acanthocephala
- Class: Palaeacanthocephala
- Order: Echinorhynchida
- Family: Cavisomidae
- Genus: Filisoma; Van Cleave, 1928

Genus of parasitic worms

Filisoma is a genus in Acanthocephala (thorny-headed worms, also known as spiny-headed worms).

== Taxonomy ==
The genus was described by Van Cleave in 1928. The National Center for Biotechnology Information indicates phylogenetic analysis has been published on any Filisoma species.

== Description ==
Filisoma species consist of a proboscis covered in hooks and a trunk.

== Species ==
The genus Filisoma Van Cleave, 1928 contains species.

- Filisoma acanthocybii Wang, Wang & Wu, 1993
- Filisoma argusum Kaur, Shamal, Chandran, Sharma & Sanil, 2021
- Filisoma atropi Wang and Wang, 1988
- Filisoma bucerium] Van Cleave, 1940
- Filisoma caudatum Costa Fernandes, Amin, Borges & Santos, 2019
- Filisoma fidum Van Cleve & Manter, 1947
- Filisoma filiformis Weaver & Smales, 2013
- Filisoma indicum Van Cleave, 1928
- Filisoma inglisi Gupta & Naqvi, 1986
- Filisoma longcementglandatus Amin & Nahhas, 1994
- Filisoma microcanthi Harada, 1938
- Filisoma oplegnathi Wang & Wang, 1988
- Filisoma rizalinum Tubangui & Masiluñgan, 1946
- Filisoma scatophagusi Datta & Soota, 1962

== Distribution ==
The distribution of Filisoma is determined by that of its hosts.

== Hosts ==
Life cycle of Acanthocephala. (Note: There are no known aberrant human infections for Filisoma species.)

The life cycle of an acanthocephalan consists of three stages beginning when an infective acanthor (development of an egg) is released from the intestines of the definitive host and then ingested by an arthropod, the intermediate host. Although the intermediate hosts of Filisoma are arthropods. When the acanthor molts, the second stage called the acanthella begins. This stage involves penetrating the wall of the mesenteron or the intestine of the intermediate host and growing. The final stage is the infective cystacanth which is the larval or juvenile state of an Acanthocephalan, differing from the adult only in size and stage of sexual development. The cystacanths within the intermediate hosts are consumed by the definitive host, usually attaching to the walls of the intestines, and as adults they reproduce sexually in the intestines. The acanthor is passed in the feces of the definitive host and the cycle repeats. There may be paratenic hosts (hosts where parasites infest but do not undergo larval development or sexual reproduction) for Filisoma.

Filisoma parasitizes animals. There are no reported cases of Filisoma infesting humans in the English language medical literature.

Hosts for Filisoma species

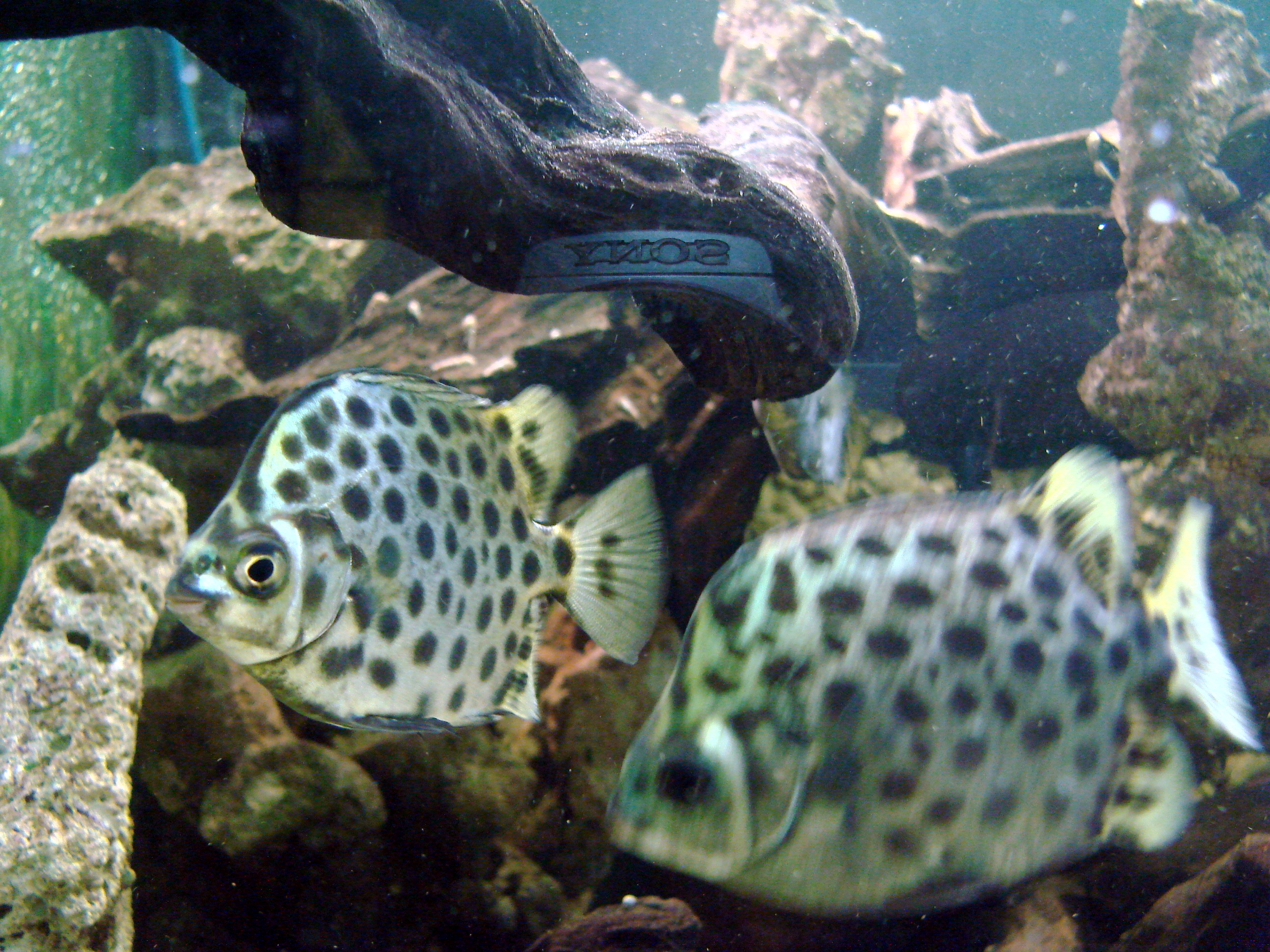
The spotted scat is a host for F. argusum
