= Neorhadinorhynchus =

Scientific classification
- Kingdom: Animalia
- Phylum: Acanthocephala
- Class: Palaeacanthocephala
- Order: Echinorhynchida
- Family: Cavisomidae
- Genus: Neorhadinorhynchus; Yamaguti, 1939

Type species
- Neorhadinorhynchus

Genus of parasitic worms

Neorhadinorhynchus is a genus in Acanthocephala (thorny-headed worms, also known as spiny-headed worms).

== Taxonomy ==
The genus was described by Yamaguti in 1939. Phylogenetic analysis has been published on Neorhadinorhynchus nudus.

== Description ==
Neorhadinorhynchus species consist of a proboscis covered in hooks and a trunk.

== Species ==
The genus Neorhadinorhynchus contains seven species.

- Neorhadinorhynchus aspinosus (Fukui and Morisita, 1937)
- Neorhadinorhynchus atlanticus Gaevskaja & Nigmatulin, 1977
- Neorhadinorhynchus atypicalis Amin & Ha, 2011
- Neorhadinorhynchus macrospinosus Amin & Nahhas, 1994
- Neorhadinorhynchus madagascariensis Golvan, 1969
- Neorhadinorhynchus myctophumi Mordvilkova, 1988
- Neorhadinorhynchus nudus (Harada, 1938)

N. nudus parasitizes Rastrelliger kanagurta who live off the cost of Sharm El-Sheikh, South Sinai, Egypt in the Red Sea.

== Distribution ==
The distribution of Neorhadinorhynchus is determined by that of its hosts.

== Hosts ==
Life cycle of Acanthocephala. (Note: There are no known aberrant human infections for Neorhadinorhynchus species.)

The life cycle of an acanthocephalan consists of three stages beginning when an infective acanthor (development of an egg) is released from the intestines of the definitive host and then ingested by an arthropod, the intermediate host. Although the intermediate hosts of Neorhadinorhynchus are arthropods. When the acanthor molts, the second stage called the acanthella begins. This stage involves penetrating the wall of the mesenteron or the intestine of the intermediate host and growing. The final stage is the infective cystacanth which is the larval or juvenile state of an Acanthocephalan, differing from the adult only in size and stage of sexual development. The cystacanths within the intermediate hosts are consumed by the definitive host, usually attaching to the walls of the intestines, and as adults they reproduce sexually in the intestines. The acanthor is passed in the feces of the definitive host and the cycle repeats. There may be paratenic hosts (hosts where parasites infest but do not undergo larval development or sexual reproduction) for Neorhadinorhynchus.

Neorhadinorhynchus parasitizes fish. There are no reported cases of Neorhadinorhynchus infesting humans in the English language medical literature.

Hosts for Neorhadinorhynchus species

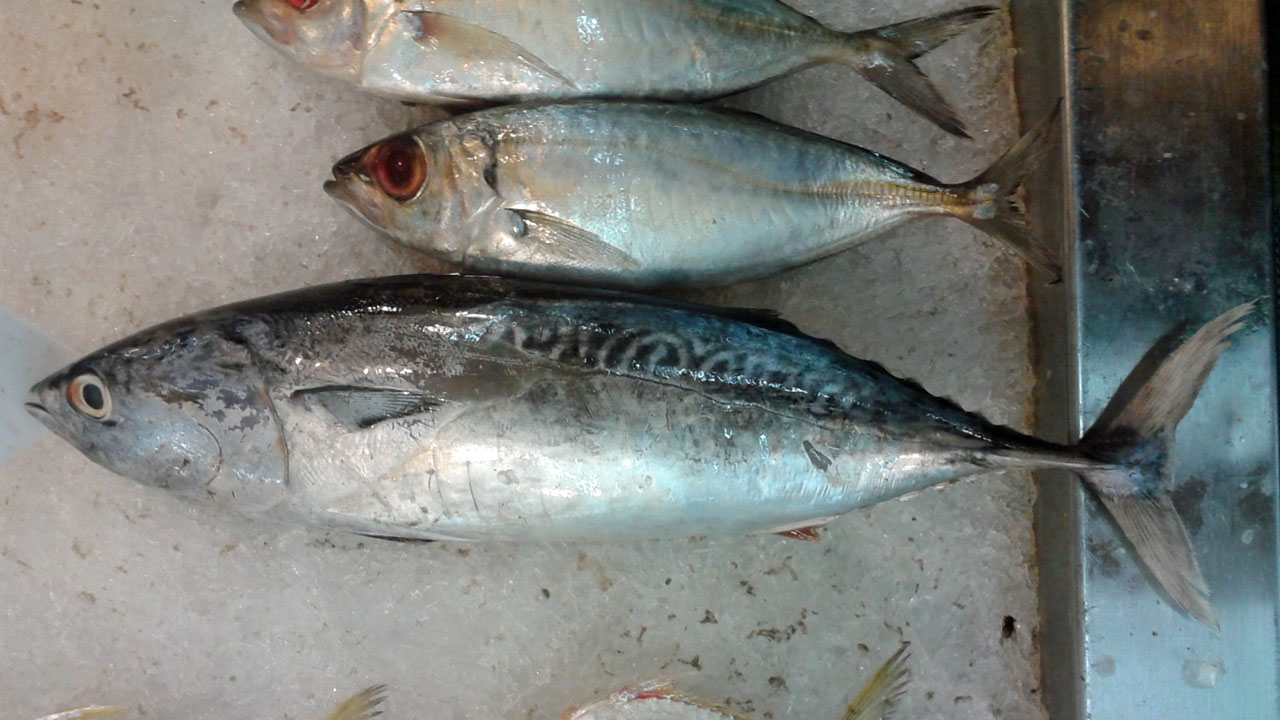
The frigate tuna (Auxis thazard) is a host for Neorhadinorhynchus nudus.
