= Australiformis =

Scientific classification
- Kingdom: Animalia
- Phylum: Acanthocephala
- Class: Archiacanthocephala
- Order: Moniliformida
- Family: Moniliformidae
- Genus: Australiformis; Schmidt and Edmonds, 1989
- Species: A. semoni

Binomial name
- Australiformis semoni (Linstow, 1898)

Synonyms
- Echinorhynchus semoni Linstow, 1898; Gigantorhynchus semoni (Porta, 1908); Prosthenorchis semoni (Travassos, 1917); Moniliformis semoni (Johnston and Edmonds, 1952)

Genus of parasitic worms

Australiformis is a genus of acanthocephalans (thorny-headed or spiny-headed parasitic worms) containing a single known species, Australiformis semoni. It infests marsupials in Australia and New Guinea. Its body consists of a proboscis armed with hooks which it uses to pierce and hold the gut wall of its host, and a long trunk. This genus resembles species in the genus Moniliformis but is characterized by a lack of spiral muscles in the outer wall of the proboscis receptacle. The proboscis is armed with 12 rows of 13 to 15 hooks which are used to attach themselves to the small or large intestines of the host. The female worms range from 95 to 197 millimetres (3.7 to 7.8 in) long, virtually all of which is the trunk, and 1.75 to 3.5 millimetres (0.069 to 0.138 in) wide. There is pronounced sexual dimorphism in this species as females are around twice the size of the males whose trunks range from 46 to 80 millimetres (1.8 to 3.1 in) long and 2 millimetres (0.079 in) wide. Infestation by A. semoni may cause debilitating inflammation of the stomach (gastritis) with granulomatous ulcers.

The life cycle of A. semoni remains unknown; however, like other acanthocephalans, it likely involves complex life cycles with at least two hosts. Although the intermediate host for Heptamegacanthus is not definitively identified, it is presumed to be an insect. In this host, the larvae develop into an infectious stage known as a cystacanth. These are then ingested by the definitive host, where they mature and reproduce sexually within the intestines. The resulting eggs are expelled and hatch into new larvae.

== Taxonomy ==
The taxonomic history of A. semoni is complex. It was originally named Echinorhynchus semoni by Linstow in 1898, and then moved to Gigantorhynchus by Porta in 1908 and Johnston in 1909, later moved to Prosthenorchis by Travassos in 1917, then renamed Moniliformis semoni by Johnston and Edmonds in 1952 before taking the present name and genus by Schmidt and Edmonds in 1989. The genus is monotypic, the only species, Australiformis semoni (Linstow, 1898) (Note: A binomial authority in parentheses indicates that the species was originally described in a genus other than Australiformis.), being necessarily the type species. Linstow named the species semoni after the German zoologist who discovered it, Richard Semon.

The morphological traits of a simple, double-walled proboscis receptacle, eight cement glands (which are used to temporarily close the posterior end of the female after copulation) each with a giant nucleus, the brain at the posterior end of proboscis receptacle, and dorsal and ventral lacunar canals place this genus confidently in the order Moniliformida. The genus Australiformis Schmidt and Edmonds, 1989 was created for Moniliformis semoni as this species differed from other species in Moniliformis and the other genera of the family Moniliformidae, Promoniliformis, because it lacked spiral muscles in the outer wall of the proboscis receptacle. The parasitizing of marsupials is also a unique trait of this genus among Acanthocephala. The National Center for Biotechnology Information does not indicate that any phylogenetic analysis has been published on Australiformis that would confirm its position as a unique genus in the family Moniliformidae.

Archiacanthocephala

- Archiacanthocephala
  - Oligacanthorhynchidae
    - Macracanthorhynchus ingens
    - Oncicola venezuelensis
    - Oligacanthorhynchus tortuosa
    - Nephridiacanthus major
  - - Moniliformidae
      - Moniliformis moniliformis
      - Australiformis semoni ?
    - Gigantorhynchida
      - Mediorhynchus sp.
      - Gigantorhynchus echinodiscus

Phylogenetic reconstruction for select species in the class Archiacanthocephala based on a 28S rRNA gene comparison from Gomes et al. (2019) and a 18S rDNA gene comparison from Amin et al. (2020). Unlike the other species shown, no genetic testing has been conducted on Australiformis semoni to confirm this classification which is inferred based on morphological traits.

== Description ==
Anatomical measurements of A. semoni
Measurements	Female (mm)	Male (mm)
Length of proboscis	0.640–0.800	0.600–0.840
Width of proboscis	0.280–0.320	0.200–0.288
Length of proboscis receptacle	1.2–1.58	1.0–1.7
Width of proboscis receptacle	0.3–0.48	0.32–0.36
Length of neck	0.225–0.240	0.150–0.240
Width of neck at base	0.200–0.270	0.200–0.270
Length of trunk	95–197	46–80
Width of trunk	1.75–3.5	2
Length of lemnisci	25–27	20–25
Size of anterior testis		2.7–3.2 x 0.75–1.0
Size of posterior testis		2.5–3.2 x 0.75–1.0
Size of cement glands		0.64–1.2 x 0.44–0.72
Size of Saefftigen's pouch		1.28 x 0.48–0.64
Size of eggs	0.080–0.086 x 0.035–0.044	
Distance from the uterine bell (Note: A funnel like opening continuous with the uterus.) to genital pore	1.95–2.2	

A. semoni consists of a proboscis covered in hooks, a proboscis receptacle, and a long trunk. There is pronounced sexual dimorphism in this species; the females are around twice as long as the males (up to approximately 20 centimetres (7.9 in) in females and 8 centimetres (3.1 in) in males). The proboscis is long and swollen at the anterior end and tapers rapidly to a narrow base. The proboscis is armed with 12 rows of 13 to 15 hooks. The first three to four hooks in each row are large, aligned in straight rows, and have bifid roots whereas the other 10 to 12 posterior hooks are small rootless spines arranged in spirals down the proboscis. The first hook of each row is 40 to 56 micrometres (0.0016 to 0.0022 in) long, the second is 50 to 60 micrometres (0.0020 to 0.0024 in) long, the third is 42 to 50 micrometres (0.0017 to 0.0020 in) long, the fourth is 42 to 54 micrometres (0.0017 to 0.0021 in) long and the remaining spines are 30 to 60 micrometres (0.0012 to 0.0024 in) long. At the base of the proboscis is a double-walled proboscis receptacle with a smooth outer wall, lacking spirally arranged muscle fibers, and a large space between the walls. The brain is located near the posterior end of the proboscis receptacle with retinacula (a band of thickened deep fascia around tendons that holds them in place) piercing the proboscis receptacle wall laterally. Proboscis retractor muscles pierce the posterior end of the proboscis receptacle.

The trunk is not pseudosegmented, is very thin at the anterior end and thickest at the posterior end averaging only a few millimeters in width. The main longitudinal lacunar canals are dorsal and ventral, with the dorsal canal being conspicuous and the ventral canal being very narrow. The transverse commissural canals are evenly spaced and connect to the main longitudinal canals. The lemnisci (bundles of sensory nerve fibers) are long, slender, twisted, and coiled in the body cavity (not attached distally to the body wall), and contain 10 to 15 giant nuclei each. They extend between one quarter to one third the length of the body.

The eggs are oval with three apparent membranes. The outer membrane is thick with the exception of the anterior end where it is thin. The outer membrane is often indented and the posterior end is usually covered in small dots on the outer surface with a knob on the inner surface. The second membrane is very thin and the third membrane is thick. The males have a sensory pore on each side of the neck. Males have eight oval cement glands, each with a single giant nucleus, and possess a Saefftigen's pouch just behind the testes. The testes are oval in tandem and found near the posterior end of the trunk. The genital pore is located at the terminal end of the trunk in both sexes.

== Distribution ==
The distribution of A. semoni is determined by that of its hosts. A. semoni has been found in several states of Australia, including Queensland, New South Wales, and Tasmania. This parasite has also been found in Boroko, Papua New Guinea. The type locality is the Upper Burnett River region in south-eastern Queensland.

== Hosts and pathology ==
Life cycle of Acanthocephala. (Note: A 2001 survey of the literature found no known cases of human infection by A. semoni.)

The life cycle of an acanthocephalan consists of three stages beginning when an infective acanthor (development of an egg) is released from the intestines of the definitive host and then ingested by an arthropod, the intermediate host. Although the intermediate hosts of Australiformis are not known, without exception for the order Moniliformida, this intermediate host is an insect. When the acanthor molts, the second stage called the acanthella begins. This stage involves penetrating the wall of the mesenteron or the intestine of the intermediate host and growing. The final stage is the infective cystacanth which is the larval or juvenile state of an Acanthocephalan, differing from the adult only in size and stage of sexual development. The cystacanths within the intermediate hosts are consumed by the definitive host, usually attaching to the walls of the intestines, and as adults they reproduce sexually in the intestines. The acanthor are passed in the feces of the definitive host and the cycle repeats. There are no known paratenic hosts (hosts where parasites infest but do not undergo larval development or sexual reproduction) for Australiformis.

A. semoni parasitizes Australian and New Guinean marsupials including the type host, southern brown bandicoot (Isoodon obesulus) and related species such as the northern brown bandicoot (Isoodon macrourus), long-nosed bandicoot (Perameles nasuta), striped bandicoot (Perameles gunnii), common echymipera (Echymipera kalubu), and brush-tailed phascogale (Phascogale tapoatafa). A. semoni infests these hosts by using hooks on their proboscis to pierce and hold the wall of the small and large intestines. A. semoni has also been found with the anterior end embedded in the mucosa of the stomach in the striped bandicoot. This infestation, which all observed cases contained 5 or fewer individual worms, may cause debilitating ulcerative granulomatous gastritis, a form of gastritis (inflammation of the stomach) characterised by ulcers and granuloma (an aggregation of macrophages that forms in response to chronic inflammation). Juvenile worms were found in the accidental host (an organism that generally does not allow transmission to the definitive host) brown antechinus (Antechinus stuartii). There are no reported cases of A. semoni infesting humans in the English language medical literature.

Hosts for Australiformis semoni

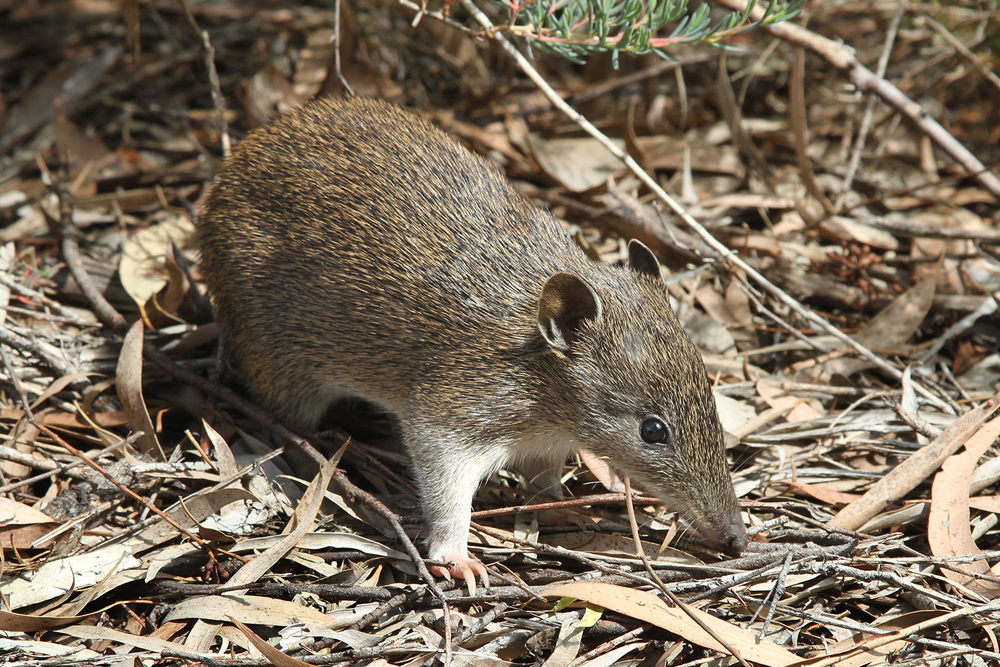
The Southern brown bandicoot is the type host of A. semoni.

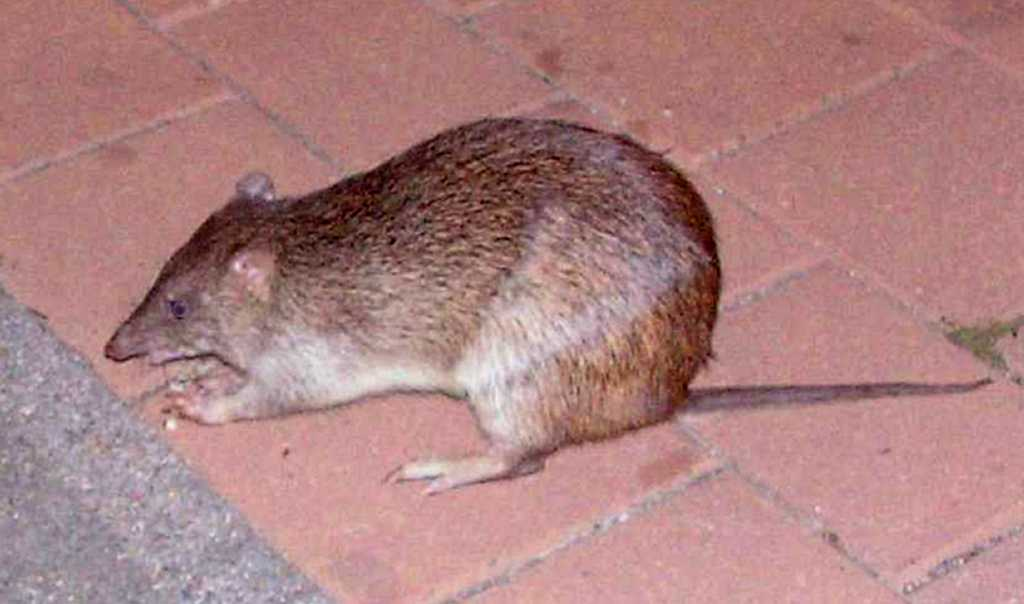
Northern brown bandicoot

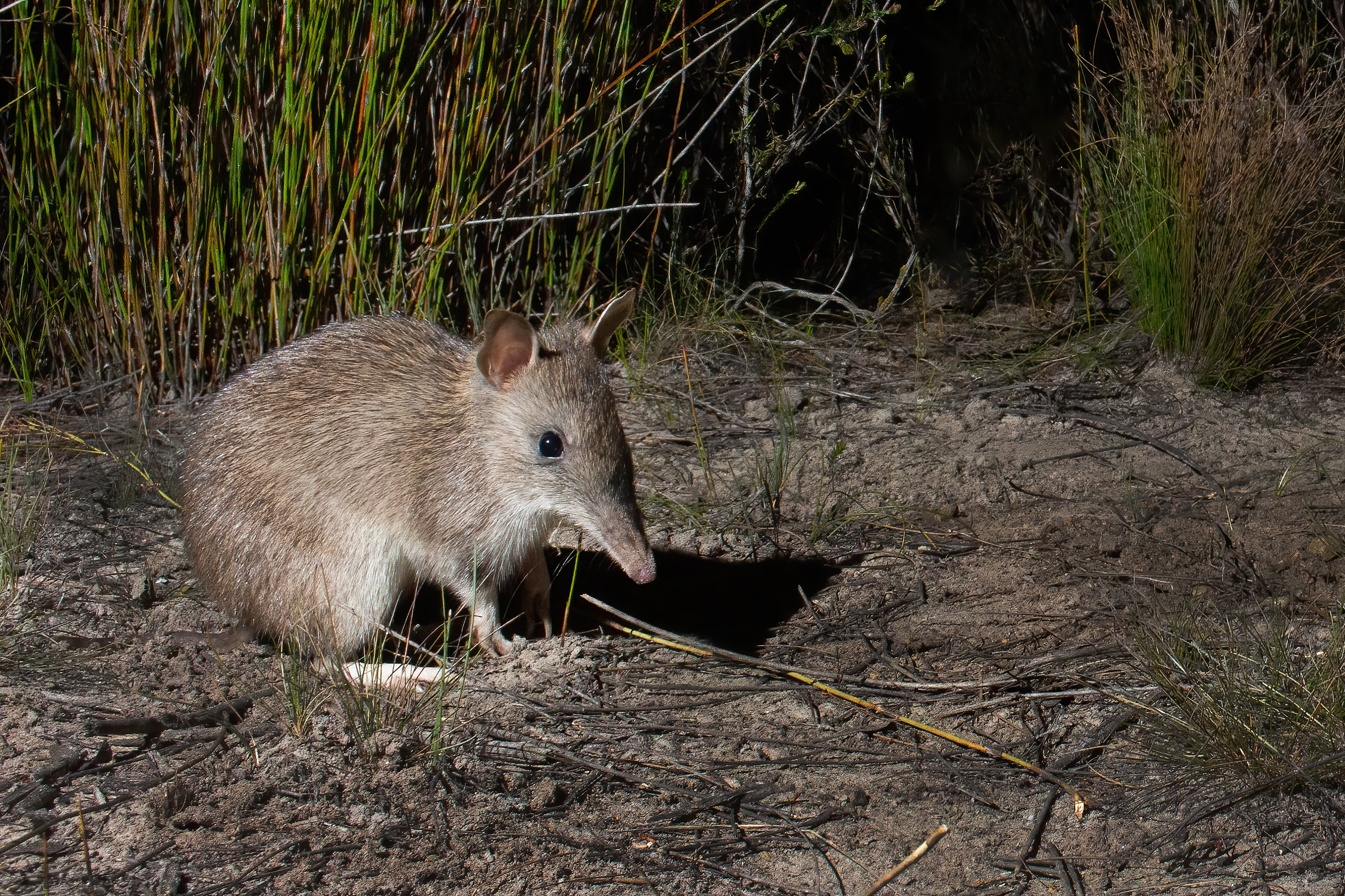
Long-nosed bandicoot

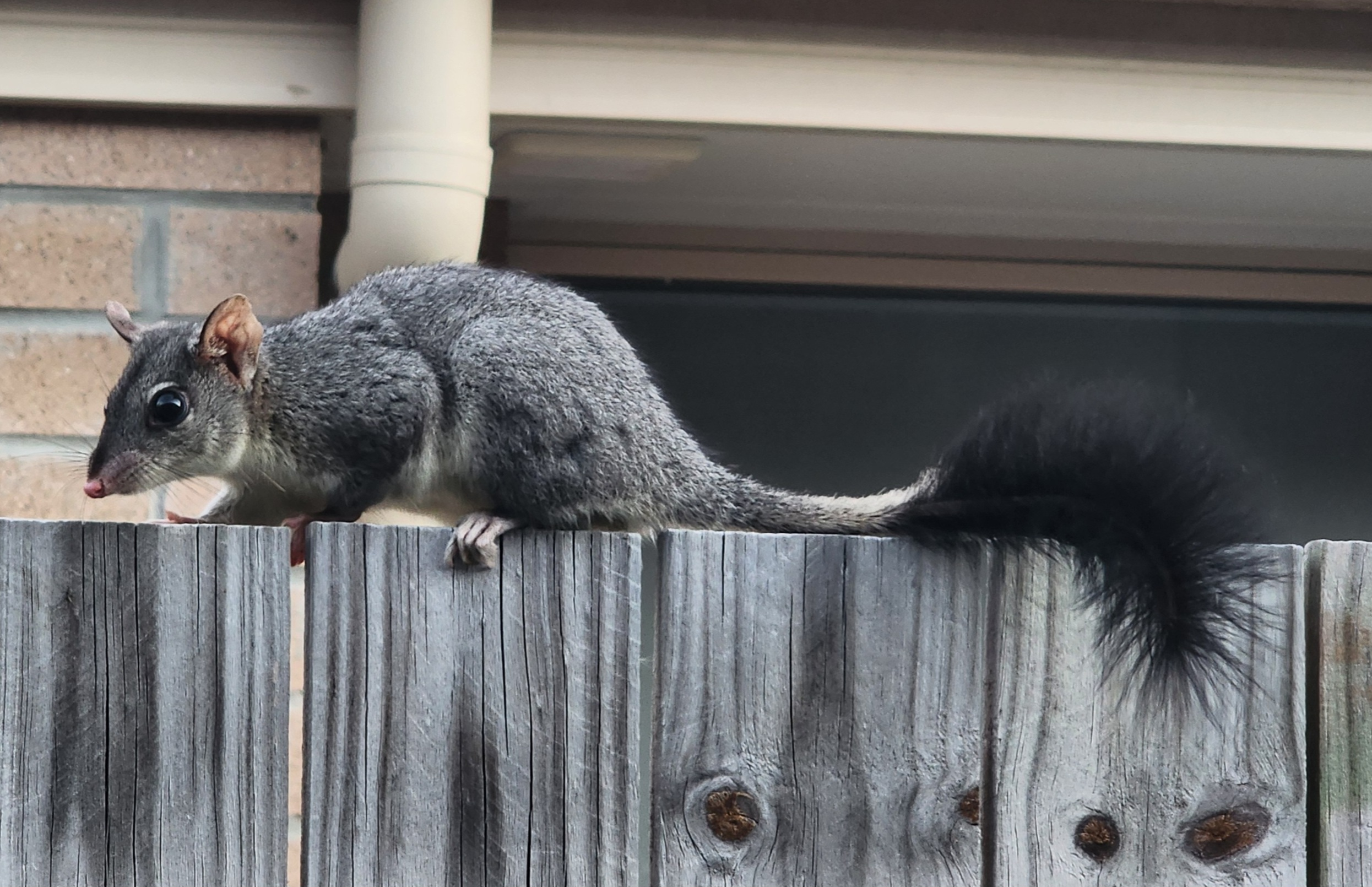
Brush-tailed phascogale
