= Neoncicola =

Scientific classification
- Kingdom: Animalia
- Phylum: Acanthocephala
- Class: Archiacanthocephala
- Order: Oligacanthorhynchida
- Family: Oligacanthorhynchidae
- Genus: Neoncicola; Schmidt, 1972

Genus of worms

Neoncicola is a genus of parasitic worms containing nine species and belongs to the family Oligacanthorhynchidae.

== Taxonomy ==
Phylogenetic analyses have been conducted on Oncicola, a genus morphologically nearly identical to Neoncicola and Pachysentis apart from the number of hooks on the proboscis, and have also placed it in the family Oligacanthorhynchidae.

Archiacanthocephala

- Archiacanthocephala
  - Oligacanthorhynchidae
    - Macracanthorhynchus ingens
    - Oncicola venezuelensis
    - Oligacanthorhynchus tortuosa
    - Nephridiacanthus major
    - Pachysentis canicola
  - - Moniliformidae
      Moniliformis moniliformis
    - Gigantorhynchida
      - Mediorhynchus sp.
      - Gigantorhynchus echinodiscus

Phylogenetic reconstruction for select species in the class Archiacanthocephala based on a 28S rRNA gene comparison from Gomes et al. (2019) and a 18S rDNA gene comparison from Amin and colleagues (2020). Amin and colleagues (2022) used the 18S rDNA gene and ITS1-5.8-ITS2 region of ribosomal RNA comparisons to add P. canicola phylogenetically to the family Oligacanthorhynchidae.

== Description ==
The distinguishing characteristic separating Neoncicola from these similar genera is that it possesses 30 hooks, as opposed to 36 for Oncicola and more than 36 for Pachysentis.

== Species ==
There are nine species in the genus Neoncicola. (Note: A binomial authority in parentheses indicates that the species was originally described in a genus other than the present genus.)

- Neoncicola artibei Smales, 2007

N. artibei was found infesting the Great fruit-eating bat (Artibeus lituratus). The species was named after the genus of the host, Artibeus.

- Neoncicola avicola (Travassos, 1917)

N. avicola was originally described from specimens found in the Red-winged tinamou (Rhynchotus rufescens) in Brazil. Despite the name avicola (meaning "bird-dweller"), it is an atypical member of a genus usually found in mammals.

- Neoncicola bursata (Meyer, 1931)

N. bursata was identified in the South American coati (Nasua nasua) and the Ocelot (Leopardus pardalis). It is primarily distributed across Central and South America.

- Neoncicola curvata (von Linstow, 1897)

N. curvata was originally described from the European polecat (Mustela putorius) in Russia (Leningrad region, present day St. Petersburg). This species is known to infect various small carnivores across Eurasia.

- Neoncicola novellae (Parona, 1890)

N. novellae was collected from the Artiodactyl hosts in Ethiopia (formerly Abyssinia). It is one of the few species in this genus recorded from Africa.

- Neoncicola pintoi (Machado-Filho, 1950)

N. pintoi was recovered from the Molina's hog-nosed skunk (Conepatus chinga) in Brazil. It was originally placed in the genus Pachysentis before being reassigned.

- Neoncicola potosi (Machado-Filho, 1950)

N. potosi is named after its host genus Potos. It was found infesting the Kinkajou (Potos flavus) in Brazil and Panama.

- Neoncicola skrjabini (Morosow, 1951)

N. skrjabini was found in the Gray wolf (Canis lupus) within the former USSR.

== Hosts ==
Life cycle of Acanthocephala. (Note: There are no known aberrant human infections for Neoncicola species.)

The life cycle of an acanthocephalan consists of three stages beginning when an infective acanthor (development of an egg) is released from the intestines of the definitive host and then ingested by an arthropod, the intermediate host. The intermediate host of M. myrmecobius is inferred to be termites, the main diet of the numbat. When the acanthor molts, the second stage called the acanthella begins. This stage involves penetrating the wall of the mesenteron or the intestine of the intermediate host and growing. The final stage is the infective cystacanth which is the larval or juvenile state of an Acanthocephalan, differing from the adult only in size and stage of sexual development. The cystacanths within the intermediate hosts are consumed by the definitive host, usually attaching to the walls of the intestines, and as adults they reproduce sexually in the intestines. The acanthor are passed in the feces of the definitive host and the cycle repeats. There are no known paratenic hosts (hosts where parasites infest but do not undergo larval development or sexual reproduction) for Neoncicola.

Neoncicola has been found parasitizing bats. There are no reported cases of Neoncicola infesting humans in the English language medical literature.

Hosts for Neoncicola

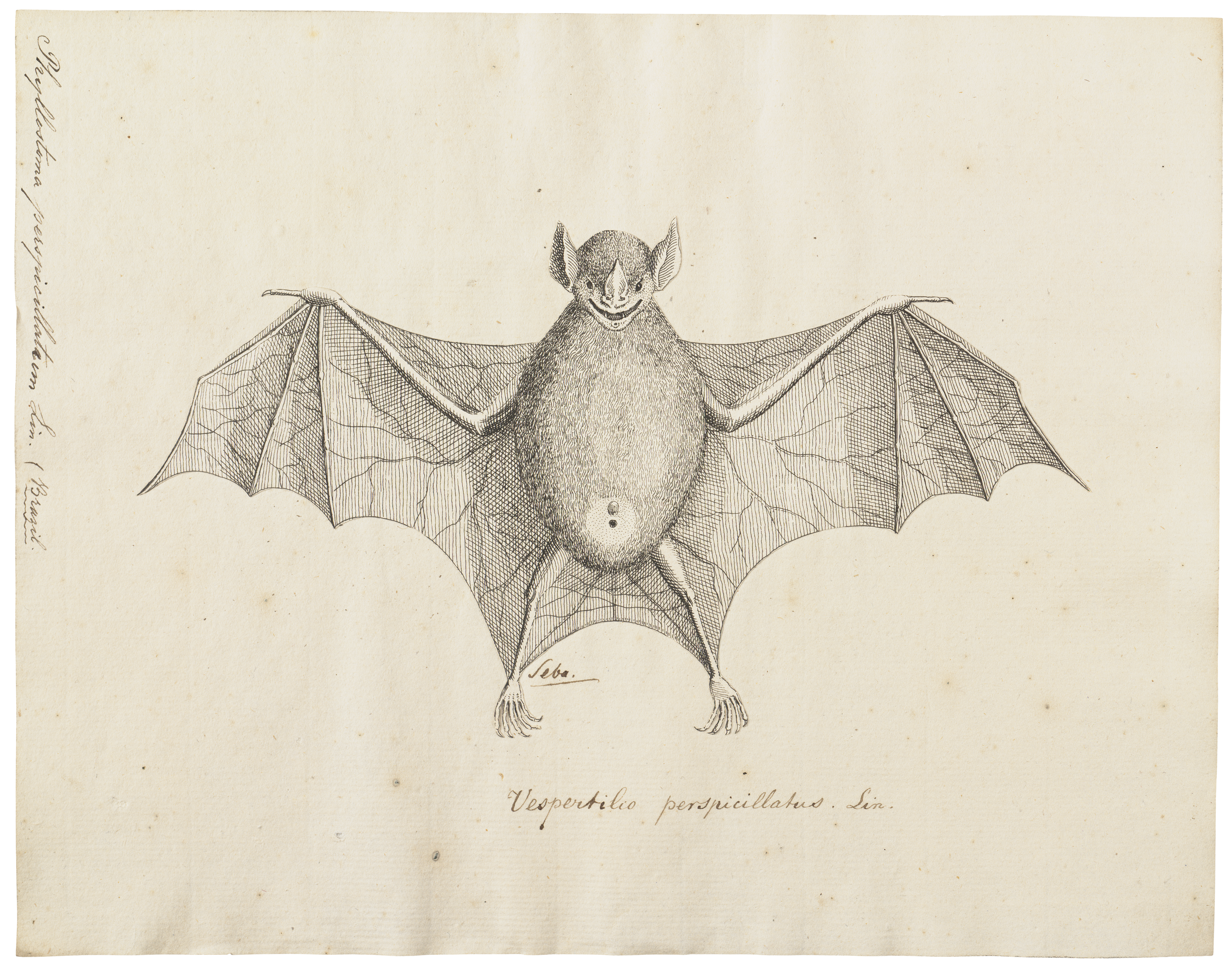
The Great fruit-eating bat is a host of Neoncicola artibei
