= Tchadorhynchus =

Scientific classification
- Kingdom: Animalia
- Phylum: Acanthocephala
- Class: Archiacanthocephala
- Order: Oligacanthorhynchida
- Family: Oligacanthorhynchidae
- Genus: Tchadorhynchus; Troncy, 1970
- Species: T. quentini

Binomial name
- Tchadorhynchus quentini Troncy, 1970

Genus of parasitic worms

Tchadorhynchus is a monotypic genus of acanthocephalans (thorny-headed or spiny-headed parasitic worms). It contains a single species, Tchadorhynchus quentini, which infests hyenas (Manis pentadactyla) in Chad.

== Taxonomy ==
T. quentini is the type species. The National Center for Biotechnology Information does not indicate that any phylogenetic analysis has been published on Tchadorhynchus that would confirm its position as a unique order in the family Oligacanthorhynchidae.

== Description ==
Tchadorhynchus Troncy, 1970 was erected as the single species contained within differs from related Oligacanthorhynchidae genera by morphological features of bot the adult and embryo as well as the group of hosts, hyenas, the worms parasitize.

== Distribution ==
The distribution of T. quentini is determined by that of its hosts. T. quentini has been found in Chad.

== Hosts ==
Life cycle of Acanthocephala. (Note: There are no known aberrant human infections for T. quentini species.)

The life cycle of an acanthocephalan consists of three stages beginning when an infective acanthor (development of an egg) is released from the intestines of the definitive host and then ingested by an arthropod, the intermediate host. The intermediate hosts of Tchadorhynchus are ?. When the acanthor molts, the second stage called the acanthella begins. This stage involves penetrating the wall of the mesenteron or the intestine of the intermediate host and growing. The final stage is the infective cystacanth which is the larval or juvenile state of an Acanthocephalan, differing from the adult only in size and stage of sexual development. The cystacanths within the intermediate hosts are consumed by the definitive host, usually attaching to the walls of the intestines, and as adults they reproduce sexually in the intestines. The acanthor is passed in the feces of the definitive host and the cycle repeats. There are no known paratenic hosts (hosts where parasites infest but do not undergo larval development or sexual reproduction) for Tchadorhynchus.

Tchadorhynchus quentini was found parasitizing the striped hyena (Hyaena hyaena) and the spotted hyena (Crocuta crocuta)in Chad. There are no reported cases of T. quentini infesting humans in the English language medical literature.

Hosts for Tchadorhynchus quentini

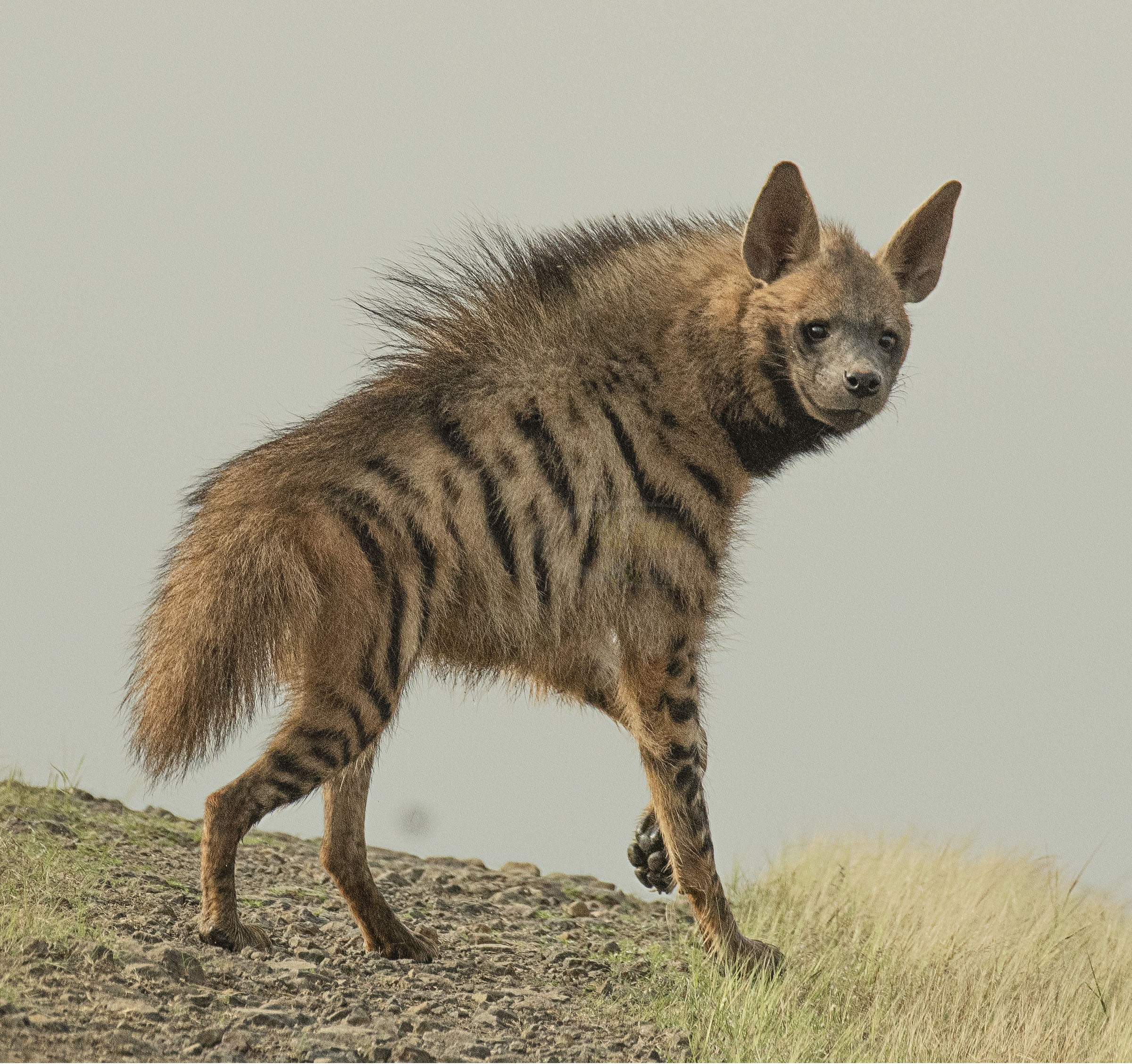
The Striped hyena is a host of T. quentini

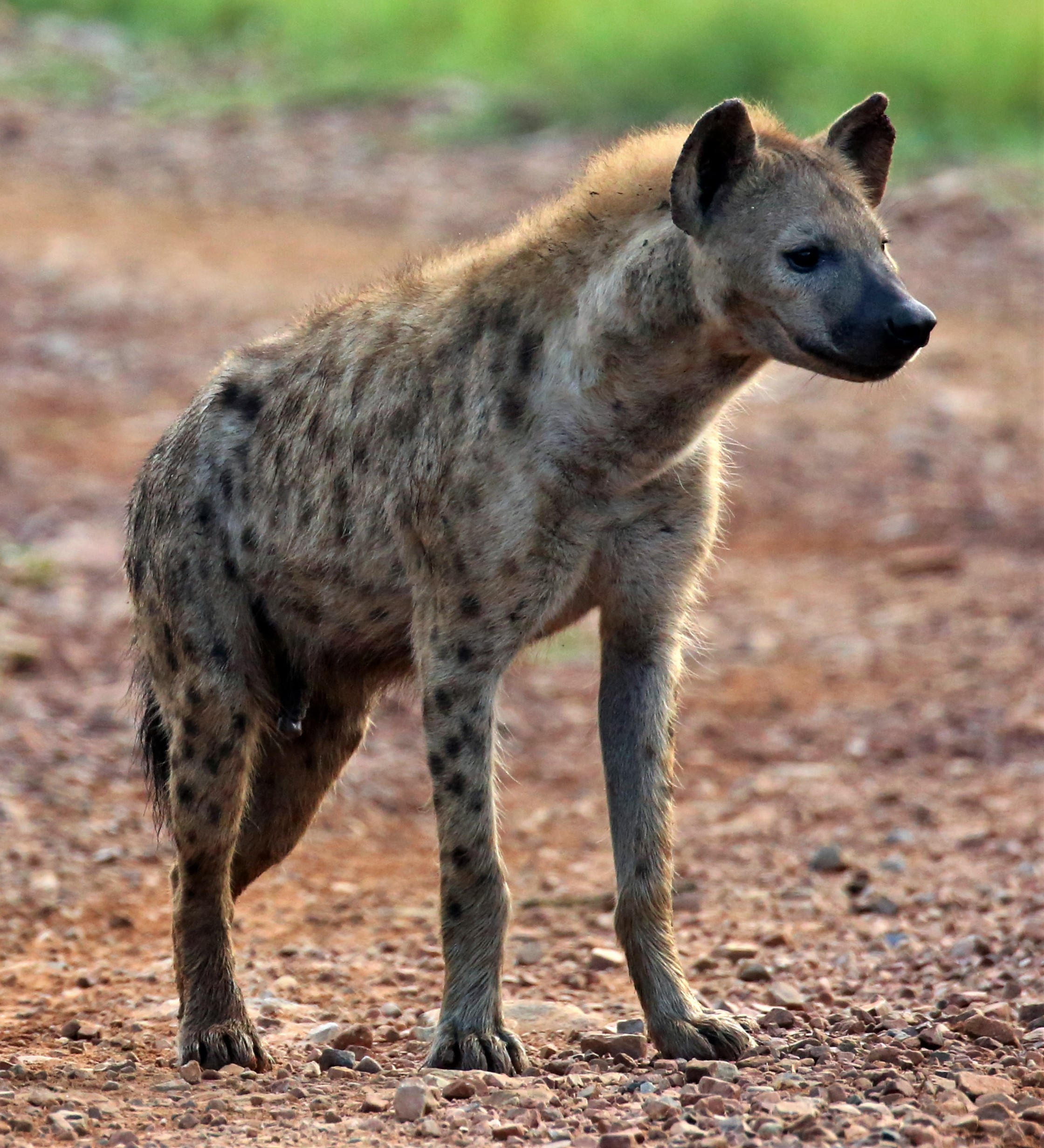
The Spotted hyena is a host of T. quentini
