= Paraprosthenorchis =

Scientific classification
- Kingdom: Animalia
- Phylum: Acanthocephala
- Class: Archiacanthocephala
- Order: Oligacanthorhynchida
- Family: Oligacanthorhynchidae
- Genus: Paraprosthenorchis; Amin, Ha and Heckmann, 2008
- Species: P. ornatus

Binomial name
- Paraprosthenorchis ornatus Amin, Ha and Heckmann, 2008

Genus of parasitic worms

Paraprosthenorchis is a monotypic genus of acanthocephalans (thorny-headed or spiny-headed parasitic worms). It contains a single species, Paraprosthenorchis ornatus, which infests the Chinese pangolin (Manis pentadactyla) in Vietnam.

== Taxonomy ==
Paraprosthenorchis was described by Amin, Ha and Heckmann in 2008. This genus is named for its nearest oligacanthorhynchid genus, Prosthenorchis. The National Center for Biotechnology Information does not indicate that any phylogenetic analysis has been published on Paraprosthenorchis that would confirm its position as a unique order in the family Oligacanthorhynchidae.

== Description ==
P. ornatus have a trunk over 200 mm long, ornate proboscis with three non-barbed hooks in each of 16 rows. They have simple hook roots without manubria, and a large oblong horizontally posterior hook base. There are about 35 festoons. Protonephridia are gill-like and capsular. Gonopore is terminal. The primary host are Manidae in Vietnam with ants and termites as intermediate hosts.

P. ornatus has been found in the intestine of the Chinese pangolin (Manis pentadactyla) collected from the Hanoi Zoological Park, Vietnam. The anterior trunk has many small festoons and proboscis hooks are inserted in elevated papillae separated by beady, near hexagonal, ornate grids. The species is named for its uniquely ornate proboscis.

== Distribution ==
The distribution of P. ornatus is determined by that of its hosts. P. ornatus has been found in Vietnam.

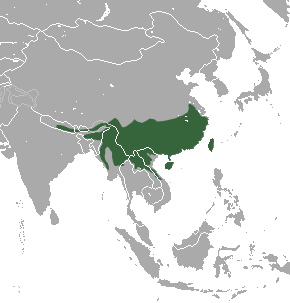
Range of the Chinese pangolin

== Hosts ==
Life cycle of Acanthocephala. (Note: There are no known aberrant human infections for P. ornatus species.)

The life cycle of an acanthocephalan consists of three stages beginning when an infective acanthor (development of an egg) is released from the intestines of the definitive host and then ingested by an arthropod, the intermediate host. The intermediate hosts of Paraprosthenorchis are termites. When the acanthor molts, the second stage called the acanthella begins. This stage involves penetrating the wall of the mesenteron or the intestine of the intermediate host and growing. The final stage is the infective cystacanth which is the larval or juvenile state of an Acanthocephalan, differing from the adult only in size and stage of sexual development. The cystacanths within the intermediate hosts are consumed by the definitive host, usually attaching to the walls of the intestines, and as adults they reproduce sexually in the intestines. The acanthor are passed in the feces of the definitive host and the cycle repeats. There are no known paratenic hosts (hosts where parasites infest but do not undergo larval development or sexual reproduction) for Paraprosthenorchis.

Paraprosthenorchis ornatus has been found parasitizing the Chinese pangolin. There are no reported cases of P. ornatus infesting humans in the English language medical literature.

Hosts for Paraprosthenorchis ornatus

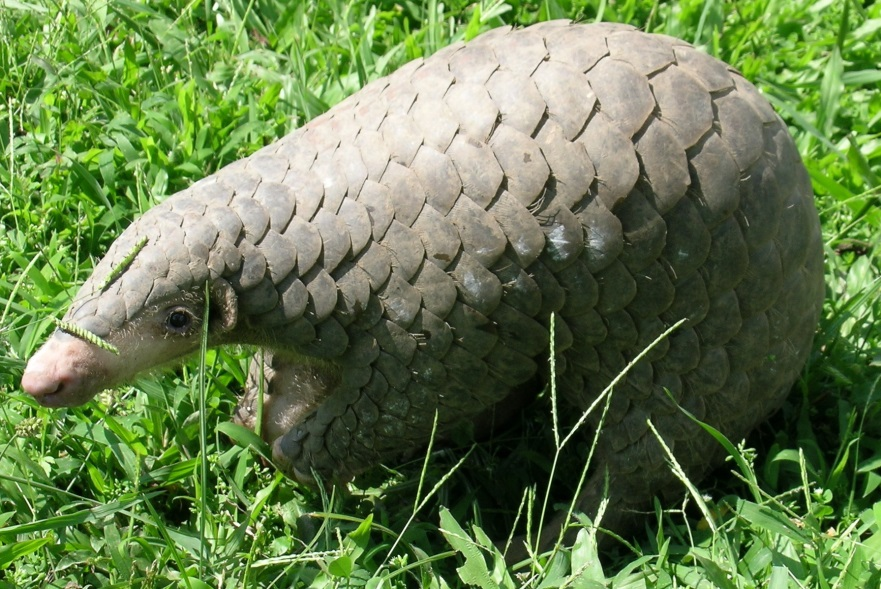
The Chinese pangolin is a host of P. ornatus
