= Cucullanorhynchus =

Scientific classification
- Kingdom: Animalia
- Phylum: Acanthocephala
- Class: Archiacanthocephala
- Order: Oligacanthorhynchida
- Family: Oligacanthorhynchidae
- Genus: Cucullanorhynchus; Amin, Ha and Heckmann, 2008
- Species: C. constrictruncatus

Binomial name
- Cucullanorhynchus constrictruncatus Amin, Ha and Heckmann, 2008
- The type locality for C. constrictruncatus is the Institute of Ecology and Biological Resources (IEBS) in Hanoi, Vietnam.

Genus of parasitic worms

Cucullanorhynchus is a genus of Acanthocephala (thorny-headed or spiny-headed parasitic worms) containing a single known species, Cucullanorhynchus constrictruncatus. The description of this genus was made from specimens that were collected from leopards in Hanoi Zoological Park in Hanoi, Vietnam. The genus is dstinguished from related Acanthocephalans in the family Oligacanthorhynchidae by the presence of an anterior hood in both sexes and a posterior constriction in females.

The life cycle of C. constrictruncatus remains unknown, but in common with other acanthocephalans, it likely involves a complex life cycle with at least two hosts. The intermediate host of Cucullanorhynchus has not been definitively identified, but it is believed to be an arthropod, such as an insect. Within this host, the larvae develop into an infectious stage called a cystacanth. When a vertebrate consumes the intermediate host, the cystacanths enter the vertebrate's intestines where they mature into adult worms and reproduce sexually, and it becomes the definitive host. The resulting eggs are expelled and hatch into new larvae. Infestation by C. constrictruncatus can cause damage to the intestines of its host.

== Taxonomy ==
Cucullanorhynchus is a genus of acanthocephalans (also called thorny-headed or spiny-headed parasitic worms) containing only the type species, C. constrictruncatus. The genus Cucullanorhynchus was circumscribed and species C. constrictruncatus was formally described in 2008 by Amin, Ha and Heckmann, from two males and seven female specimens extracted from a single leopard (Panthera pardus) from the Hanoi Zoological Park in Hanoi, Vietnam. Cucullanorhynchus is distinguished morphologically by having the anterior hood in both sexes, from which it derives its genus name (Cucullan is derived from the Latin cucullus, meaning "hood" and rhynchus referring to the proboscis, from the Greek rhynchos), and a constriction of the posterior end of the trunk in female, from which it derives the species name constrictruncatus. The National Center for Biotechnology Information does not indicate that any phylogenetic analysis has been published on Cucullanorhynchus that would confirm its position as a unique genus in the family Oligacanthorhynchidae.

== Description ==
The trunk of Cucullanorhynchus is cylindrical, short and robust. Both males and females possess an anterior hood of similar size, which is formed by a reflected fold of the body wall that can partially obscure the base of the proboscis.

The proboscis is relatively short, not quite spherical, and armed with multiple rows of hooks. There are 12 rows of hooks, each with 3 massive rooted hooks lacking barbs or manubria. These hooks are used to anchor the parasite into the intestinal wall of its host. The proboscis receptacle is enclosed in a non-muscular protrusor. Scientific analysis using X-ray scans has revealed that the outer layer of these hooks contains high concentrations of sulfur, which helps harden the calcium phosphate (apatite) structure, providing the necessary durability for attachment.

Cucullanorhynchus contain lemnisci (bundles of sensory nerve fibers) that are not equal, very long (occasionally reaching the posterior end of the trunk) and ribbon line, and not attached to the body wall distally, and have 7 angular oblong giant nulceaus within a central canal in the anterior half.

In females, the uterine wall is corrugated, and a fibrillar connective tissue extends from the gonopore to the anterior end of the uterine bell. The eggs are oval and possess a thick, multi-layered shell, typical of parasites that must survive in the external environment before being ingested by an intermediate host.

== Distribution ==
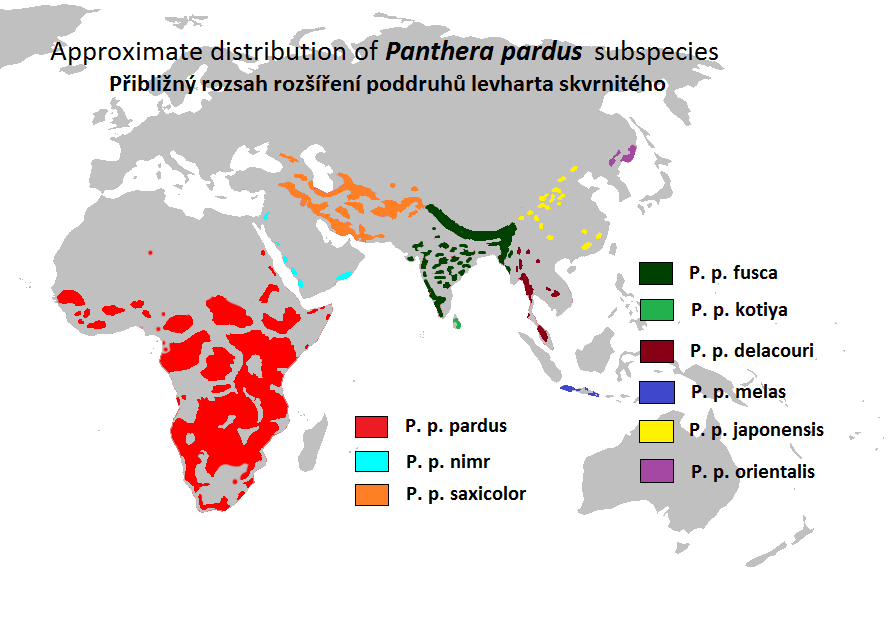
Map showing approximate distribution of leopard subspecies

The distribution of C. constrictruncatus is determined by that of its host, the leopard (Panthera pardus), and intermediate hosts, which for the family Oligacanthorhynchidae are typically terrestrial arthropods such as beetles or cockroaches. The type locality is the Zoological Park in Hanoi where the sample was obtained from its type host, the leopard. While the parasite has only been formally documented in a captive setting within Vietnam, its natural range is believed to be tied to the wild populations of its definitive host, the leopard, throughout Southeast Asia.

== Hosts ==
Life cycle of Acanthocephala (Note: A 2001 survey of the literature found no known cases of human infection by C. constrictruncatus.)

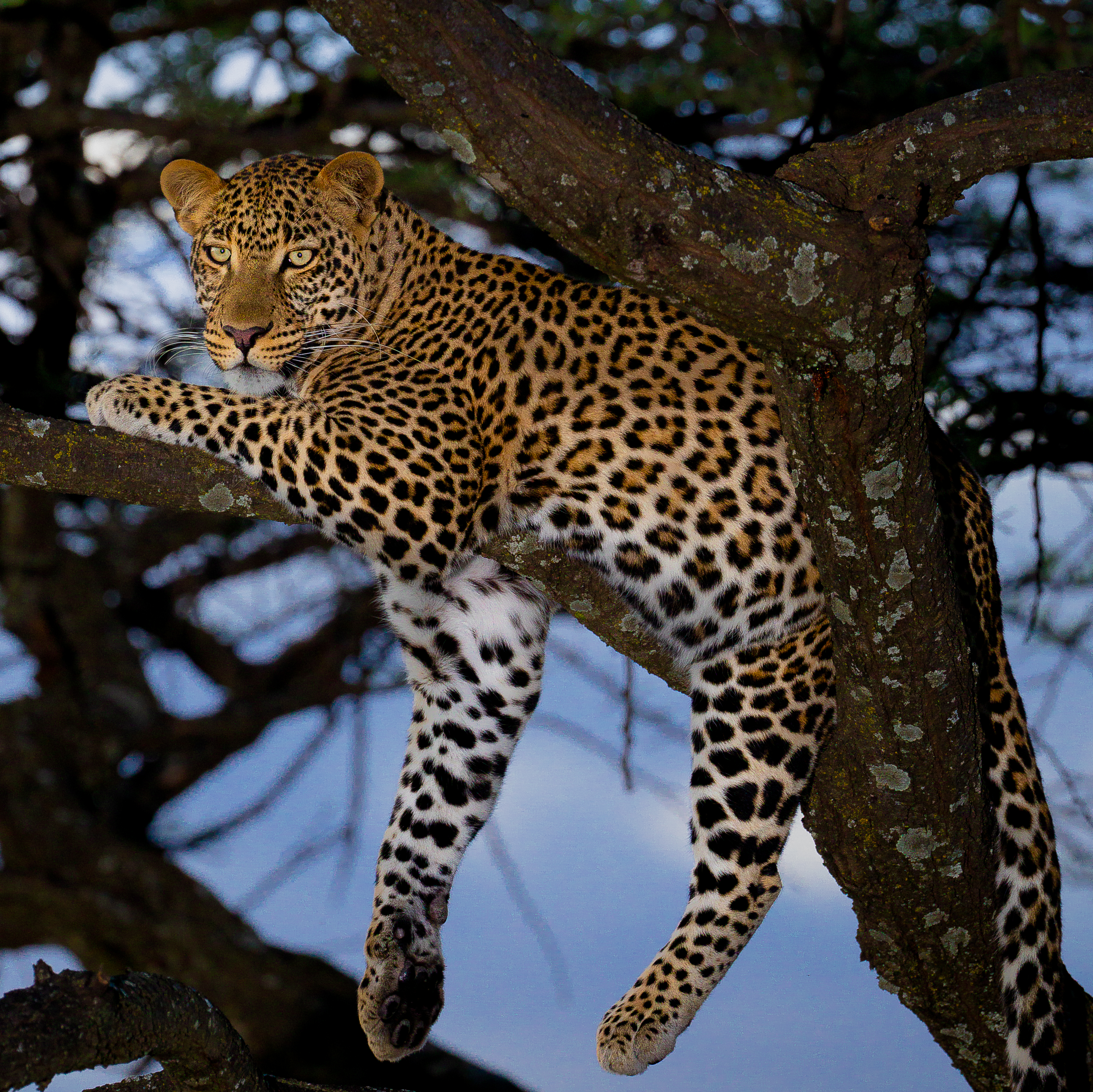
The leopard is a host of C. constrictruncatus

The specific life cycle of Cucullanorhynchus is unknown, but the life cycle of acanthocephala (thorny-headed worms) in general unfolds in three distinct stages. It begins when an egg develops into an infective form known as an acanthor. This acanthor is released with the feces of its definitive host, typically a vertebrate, and must be ingested by an intermediate host, an arthropod such as an insect, to continue its development. Although the specific intermediate hosts for the genus Cucullanorhynchus are unidentified, but is likely an insect.

Inside the intermediate host, the acanthor molts its outer layer, becoming an acanthella (the immature larval stage). At this stage it burrows into the host's intestinal wall and continues to grow. The life cycle culminates in the formation of a cystacanth, a larval stage able to infect the definitive host while retaining juvenile features (differing from the adult only in size and stage of sexual development) and awaits ingestion by the definitive host to mature fully. Once inside the definitive host, these larvae attach themselves to the intestinal wall using the hooks on their proboscis, mature into sexually reproductive adults, and complete the cycle by releasing new acanthors into the host's feces. There are no known paratenic hosts (hosts where parasites infest but do not undergo larval development or sexual reproduction) for Cucullanorhynchus.

Cucullanorhynchus constrictruncatus has been found parasitizing leopards. A survey of the medical literature published in 2021 did not list C. constrictruncatus as infecting humans.
