= Multisentis =

Scientific classification
- Kingdom: Animalia
- Phylum: Acanthocephala
- Class: Archiacanthocephala
- Order: Oligacanthorhynchida
- Family: Oligacanthorhynchidae
- Genus: Multisentis; Smales, 1997
- Species: M. myrmecobius

Binomial name
- Multisentis myrmecobius Smales, 1997

Genus of parasitic worms

Multisentis is a monotypic genus of acanthocephalans (thorny-headed or spiny-headed parasitic worms). It contains a single species, Multisentis myrmecobius , parasite of the numbat (Myrmecobius fasciatus) from which it derives its species name. It was found in south-western Australia.

== Taxonomy ==
The National Center for Biotechnology Information does not indicate that any phylogenetic analysis has been published on Multisentis that would confirm its position as a unique order in the family Oligacanthorhynchidae.

== Description ==
Multisentis consist of a proboscis covered in hooks and a trunk.

== Distribution ==
The distribution of M. myrmecobius is determined by that of its hosts. M. myrmecobius has been found in south-western Australia.

== Hosts ==
Life cycle of Acanthocephala. (Note: There are no known aberrant human infections for M. myrmecobius species.)

The life cycle of an acanthocephalan consists of three stages beginning when an infective acanthor (development of an egg) is released from the intestines of the definitive host and then ingested by an arthropod, the intermediate host. The intermediate host of M. myrmecobius is inferred to be termites, the main diet of the numbat. When the acanthor molts, the second stage called the acanthella begins. This stage involves penetrating the wall of the mesenteron or the intestine of the intermediate host and growing. The final stage is the infective cystacanth which is the larval or juvenile state of an Acanthocephalan, differing from the adult only in size and stage of sexual development. The cystacanths within the intermediate hosts are consumed by the definitive host, usually attaching to the walls of the intestines, and as adults they reproduce sexually in the intestines. The acanthor are passed in the feces of the definitive host and the cycle repeats. There are no known paratenic hosts (hosts where parasites infest but do not undergo larval development or sexual reproduction) for Multisentis.

Multisentis myrmecobius has been found parasitizing the numbat (Myrmecobius fasciatus). Infections from this parasite may have caused a population crash in 1993.There are no reported cases of M. myrmecobius infesting humans in the English language medical literature.

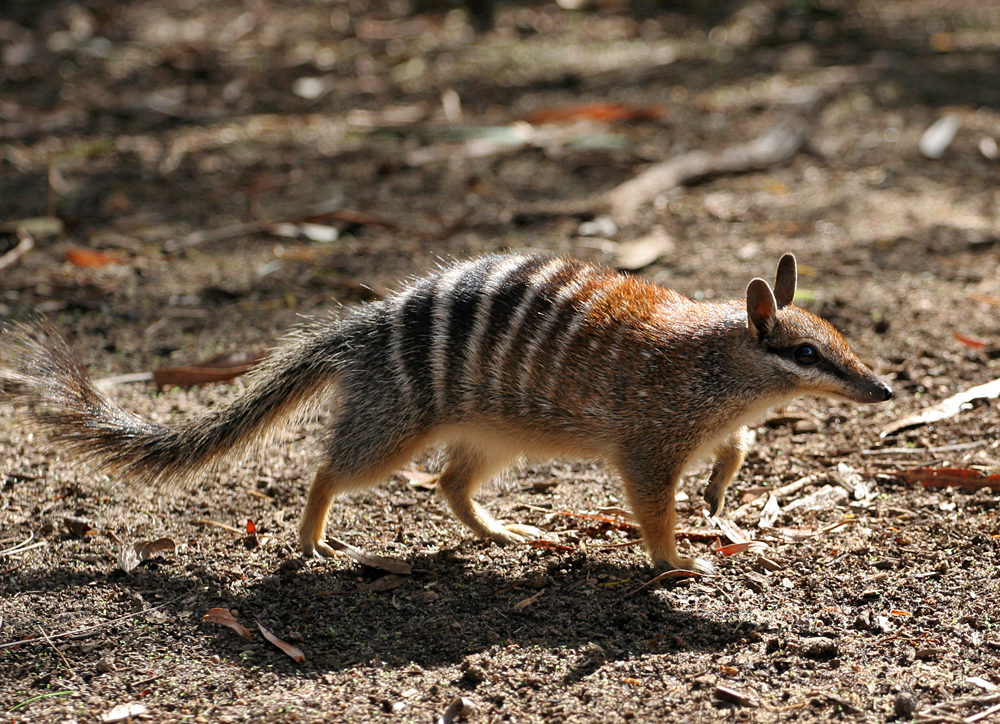
The numbat is a host of M. myrmecobius
