= Oligacanthorhynchus =

Scientific classification
- Kingdom: Animalia
- Phylum: Acanthocephala
- Class: Archiacanthocephala
- Order: Oligacanthorhynchida
- Family: Oligacanthorhynchidae
- Genus: Oligacanthorhynchus; Travassos, 1915

Genus of worms

Oligacanthorhynchus is a genus of parasitic worms belonging to the family Oligacanthorhynchidae.

== Taxonomy ==
Phylogenetic analysis has been conducted on one of the species in the genus, O.tortuosa.

Archiacanthocephala

- Archiacanthocephala
  - Oligacanthorhynchidae
    - Macracanthorhynchus ingens
    - Oncicola venezuelensis
    - Oligacanthorhynchus tortuosa
    - Nephridiacanthus major
    - Pachysentis canicola
  - - Moniliformidae
      Moniliformis moniliformis
    - Gigantorhynchida
      - Mediorhynchus sp.
      - Gigantorhynchus echinodiscus

Phylogenetic reconstruction for select species in the class Archiacanthocephala based on a 28S rRNA gene comparison from Gomes et al. (2019) and a 18S rDNA gene comparison from Amin and colleagues (2020). Amin and colleagues (2022) used the 18S rDNA gene and ITS1-5.8-ITS2 region of ribosomal RNA comparisons to add P. canicola phylogenetically to the family Oligacanthorhynchidae.

== Description ==
The trunk is cylindrical and smooth or irregularly ringed. The proboscis is generally globular being somewhat longer than it is wide and has stout hooks in left handed spiral rows, with their point obliquely cut and their root produced forwards. The proboscis receptacle consists of a thick inner wall i inserted into inside of proboscis which is shrinks along the ventral side, and a thinner outer wall inserted at base of neck. A series of intercommunicating spaces branching from two median main vessels and numerous longitudinal and circular anastomoses in the hypodermis form the lacunar system. Protonephridia are present. The lemnisci are filiform with a central canal and numerous nuclei. In the far posterior of the male, there are testes and eight cement glands used to temporarily close the posterior end of the female after copulation. The eggs are almost spherical with shells that are radially striated. Hosts include birds with snakes being the intermediate hosts.

== Species ==
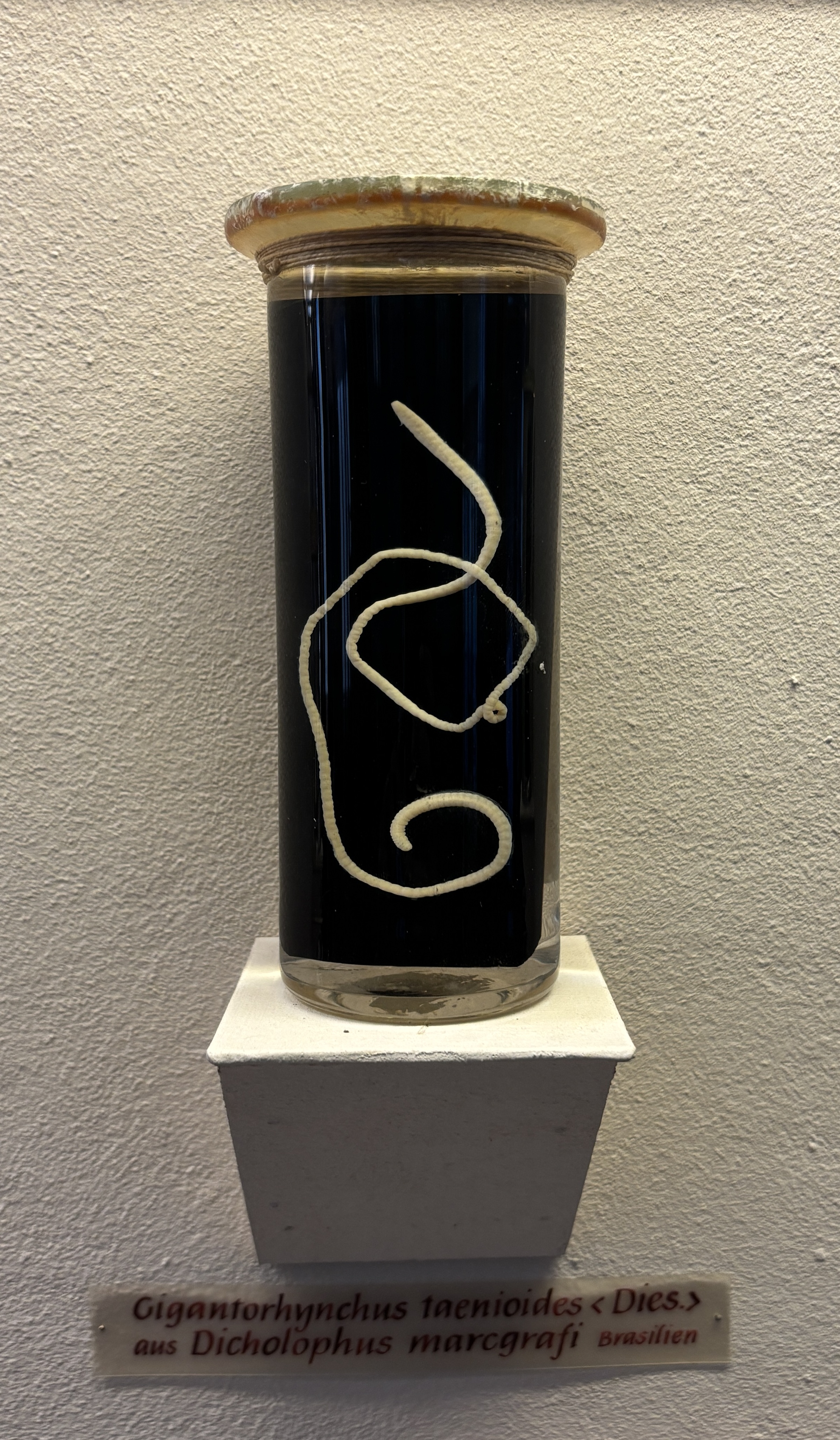
Oligacanthorhynchus taenioides

There are 33 known species in the genus Oligacanthorhynchus. (Note: A binomial authority in parentheses indicates that the species was originally described in a genus other than the present genus.)

- Oligacanthorhynchus aenigma (Reichensperger, 1922)
- Oligacanthorhynchus atratus (Meyer, 1931)
- Oligacanthorhynchus bangalorensis (Pujatti, 1951)
- Oligacanthorhynchus carinii (Travassos, 1917)

O. carinii was found infesting the southern three-banded armadillo (Tolypeutes matacus) in Paraguay.

- Oligacanthorhynchus cati (Gupta and Lata, 1967)
- Oligacanthorhynchus circumplexus (Molin, 1858)
- Oligacanthorhynchus citilli (Rudolphi, 1806)
- Oligacanthorhynchus compressus (Rudolphi, 1802)
- Oligacanthorhynchus decrescens (Meyer, 1931)
- Oligacanthorhynchus erinacei (Rudolphi, 1793)
- Oligacanthorhynchus hamatus (von Linstow, 1897)
- Oligacanthorhynchus iheringi Travassos, 1917
- Oligacanthorhynchus indicus Rengaraju and Das, 1981
- Oligacanthorhynchus kamerunensis (Meyer, 1931)
- Oligacanthorhynchus kamtschaticus Hokhlova, 1966
- Oligacanthorhynchus lagenaeformis (Westrumb, 1821)
- Oligacanthorhynchus lamasi (Freitas and Costa, 1964)
- Oligacanthorhynchus lerouxi (Bisseru, 1956)
- Oligacanthorhynchus major (Machado-Filho, 1963)
- Oligacanthorhynchus manifestus (Leidy, 1851)
- Oligacanthorhynchus mariemily (Tadros, 1969)
- Oligacanthorhynchus microcephala (Rudolphi, 1819)
- Oligacanthorhynchus minor Machado-Filho, 1964
- Oligacanthorhynchus oligacanthus (Rudolphi, 1819)
- Oligacanthorhynchus oti Machado-Filho, 1964
- Oligacanthorhynchus pardalis (Westrumb, 1821)

The eggs are 58 um long and have an elongation ratio of 1.45.

- Oligacanthorhynchus ricinoides (Rudolphi, 1808)

O. ricinoides was found inside the body cavity of 0.68% of the African five-lined skink (Trachylepis quinquetaeniata reported as Mabuya quinquetaeniata) sampled in the Qena Governorate, Egypt. The worm is cylindrical and white. The wall of the body consists of a thin cuticle over a syncytical hypodermis. The proboscis is cylindrical and contains recurved sclerotized hooks. The trunk measures 1.9–3.1 mm long by 0.56–0.77 mm wide in the female and 1.9–2.99 mm. in length and 0.58–0.98 mm in width in the much smaller male. A series of intercommunicating spaces branching from two median main vessels and numerous longitudinal and circular anastomoses in the hypodermis form the lacunar system. The proboscis receptacle is inserted in the inner side of proboscis. The lemnisci are filiform with a central canal and numerous nuclei. The testes are located in the mid-region of the body and each measure 0.14–0.15 mm long by 0.10–0.11 mm wide.

- Oligacanthorhynchus shillongensis (Sen and Chauhan, 1972)
- Oligacanthorhynchus spira (Diesing, 1851)
- Oligacanthorhynchus taenioides (Diesing, 1851)
- Oligacanthorhynchus thumbi Haffner, 1939
- Oligacanthorhynchus tortuosa (Leidy, 1850)
- Oligacanthorhynchus tumidus (Van Cleve, 1947)

== Hosts ==
Life cycle of Acanthocephala. (Note: There are no known aberrant human infections for Oligacanthorhynchus species.)

The life cycle of an acanthocephalan consists of three stages beginning when an infective acanthor (development of an egg) is released from the intestines of the definitive host and then ingested by an arthropod, the intermediate host. The intermediate host of Oligacanthorhynchus include ?. When the acanthor molts, the second stage called the acanthella begins. This stage involves penetrating the wall of the mesenteron or the intestine of the intermediate host and growing. The final stage is the infective cystacanth which is the larval or juvenile state of an Acanthocephalan, differing from the adult only in size and stage of sexual development. The cystacanths within the intermediate hosts are consumed by the definitive host, usually attaching to the walls of the intestines, and as adults they reproduce sexually in the intestines. The acanthor are passed in the feces of the definitive host and the cycle repeats. There are no known paratenic hosts (hosts where parasites infest but do not undergo larval development or sexual reproduction) for Oligacanthorhynchus.

Oligacanthorhynchus has been found parasitizing mammals. There are no reported cases of Oligacanthorhynchus infesting humans in the English language medical literature.

Hosts for Oligacanthorhynchus

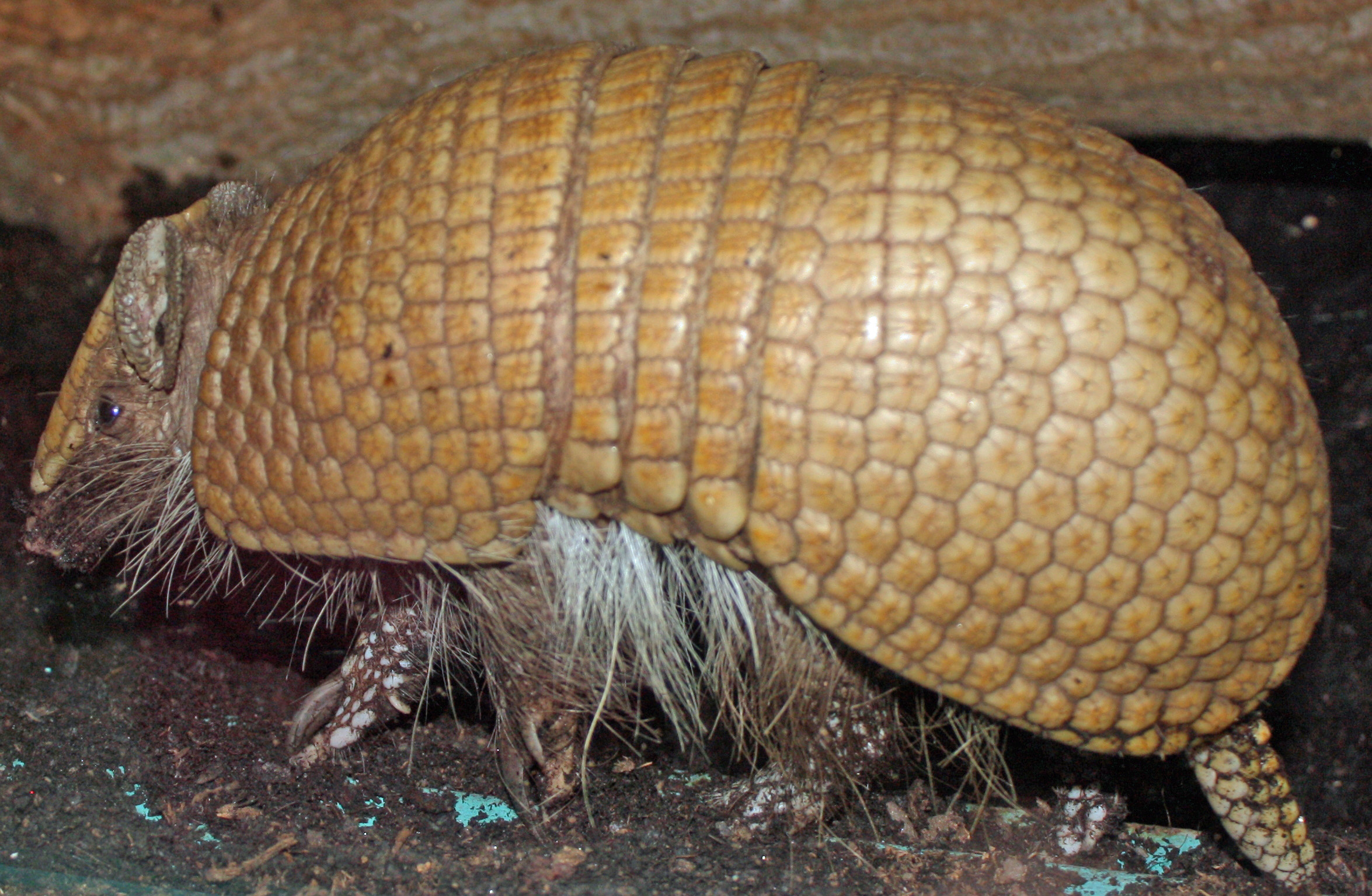
The southern three-banded armadillo is a host of O. carinii
