= Lemniscus =

Lemniscus can refer to:

- Lemniscus (anatomy)
- In mathematics, a lemniscate
