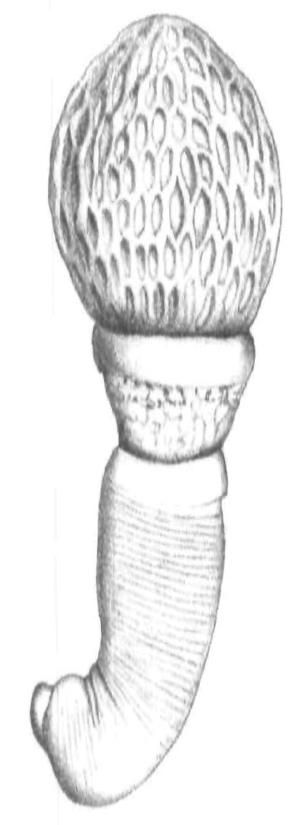
- Drawing of Apororhynchus hemignathi by Arthur Shipley in 1896. This is the original sketch of the first species in the genus Apororhynchus to be described.

Scientific classification
- Kingdom: Animalia
- Phylum: Acanthocephala
- Class: Archiacanthocephala
- Order: Apororhynchida; Thapar, 1927
- Family: Apororhynchidae; Shipley, 1899
- Genus: Apororhynchus; Shipley, 1899

Type species
- Apororhynchus hemignathi (Shipley, 1896)

Other species
- Apororhynchus aculeatus; Apororhynchus amphistomi; Apororhynchus chauhani; Apororhynchus paulonucleatus; Apororhynchus silesiacus

= Apororhynchus =

Genus of worms

Apororhynchus is a genus of small parasitic spiny-headed (or thorny-headed) worms. It is the only genus in the family Apororhynchidae, which is the only family in the order Apororhynchida. The body consists of a short, narrow trunk and a proboscis covered with hooks, which is used for feeding and attachment. The worms range from one to five millimeters long and around half a millimeter wide, with the females being significantly larger than the males. A lack of features commonly found in the phylum Acanthocephala (primarily musculature) suggests an evolutionary branching from the other three orders of class Archiacanthocephala; however no genetic analysis has been completed to determine the evolutionary relationship between species. The distinguishing features of this order among archiacanthocephalans are a highly enlarged proboscis which contain small hooks. The musculature around the proboscis (the proboscis receptacle and receptacle protrusor) is also structured differently in this order. This genus contains six species that are distributed globally, being collected sporadically in Hawaii, Europe, North America, South America, and Asia.

These worms exclusively parasitize birds by attaching themselves around the cloaca using their hook-covered proboscis. The bird hosts are of different orders, including owls, waders, and passerines. The life cycle of all Apororhynchus species remains unknown, but in common with other acanthocephalans, it likely involves a complex life cycle with at least two hosts. The intermediate hosts of Apororhynchus species have not been definitively identified, but it is believed to be an arthropod, such as an insect. Within this host, the larvae develop into an infectious stage called a cystacanth. When a vertebrate consumes the intermediate host, the cystacanths enter the vertebrate’s intestines where they mature into adult worms and reproduce sexually, and it becomes the definitive host. The resulting eggs are expelled and hatch into new larvae. Infestation by an Apororhynchus species may cause enteritis and anemia.

== Taxonomy ==
In 1896, Arthur Shipley discovered an Acanthocephalan so markedly different from others that he created a new family, Arhynchidae, and genus, Arhynchus, for the new species A. hemignathi. The name Arhynchus derives from the Ancient Greek word rhúnkhos, which means snout, nose, or beak, was chosen based on the characteristic absence of a proboscis in this species of Acanthocephala. It was later renamed Apororhynchus (along with the family name Apororhynchidae) by Shipley in 1899 due to the name Arhynchus having been used by Dejean in 1834 for a beetle.

The second species to be named was Apororhynchus aculeatus by Meyer in 1931 from a single specimen found at the Berlin Museum which was identical in all respects to the A. hemignathi apart from the host, location, and numerous fine spines on the proboscis. The third species in this genus to be named was Apororhynchus amphistomi and is also the first to be discovered in North America. It was described by Byrd and Denton in 1949 from a single sample from each of two species of warblers.

The National Center for Biotechnology Information does not indicate that any phylogenetic analysis has been published on Apororhynchida that would confirm its position as a unique order in the class Archiacanthocephala. The lack of morphological features such as an absence of a muscle plate, a midventral longitudinal muscle, lateral receptacle flexors, and an apical sensory organ when compared to the other three orders of class Archiacanthocephala indicate it is an early offshoot (basal).

== Description ==
The genus Apororhynchus consists of parastic worms that attach themselves beneath the skin and around the anus of birds. The distinguishing features of this order among acanthocephalans are a highly enlarged proboscis with limited motility and a reduced size of the hooks (or spines). Apororhynchus species have short conical trunks and a reduced or absent neck. The proboscis is large and globular with numerous deeply set spirally arranged rootless hooks usually not reaching the surface, or with no hooks. They contain sets of muscles that are common to all Acanthocephala including a proboscis receptacle, a receptacle-surrounding muscle called a receptacle protrusor, retinacula (connective tissue that stabilizes tendons), a neck retractor, proboscis and receptacle retractors, circular and longitudinal musculature under the metasomal (trunk) tegument, and a single muscular layer beneath the proboscis wall.

Two regions of musculature are considerably different in Apororhynchus compared to the other acanthocephalan orders: the proboscis receptacle and receptacle protrusor are both reorganized in Apororhynchus with the muscles subdivided into strands extending from the cerebral ganglion, or nerve bundle, to the proboscis wall. These two muscles suspend the cerebral ganglion but are not involved in the eversion of the proboscis. Additional anatomical features that can be used to distinguish this genus among other acanthocephalans include a cerebral ganglion located under the anterior wall of the proboscis, long and tubular lemnisci (bundles of sensory nerve fibers) that run along a central canal, the lack of any protonephridia (an organ which functions as a kidney), and the presence of eight pear-shaped cement glands used to temporarily close the posterior end of the female after copulation.

== Species ==
There are six valid species in the genus Apororhynchus. A seventh species, Apororhynchus bivolucrus, which was named by Das in 1950 (also called A. bivolucrus) based on a sample collected from an Egyptian vulture (Neophron percnopterus), was considered to be a strigeid trematode by Yamaguti in 1963.

Name (Note: A binomial authority in parentheses indicates that the species was originally described in a genus other than Apororhynchus.)	Taxonomy	Host(s) and range	Diagnostic features
Apororhynchus aculeatus Meyer, 1931	A. aculeatus was the second parasite to be discovered in its genus, and the specimen used to describe the species was female. Aculeus is a Latin word meaning spine or thorn, which cover the proboscis.	The crested oropendola is one of the hosts of A. aculeatus Distribution map of the crested oropendola A. aculeatus was discovered in 1931, in the Berlin Museum (now the Museum für Naturkunde Berlin), taken from the digestive tube of a bird named at that time as "Oriolus cristatus", which was likely a crested oropendola (Psarocolius decumanus). (Note: Oriolus cristatus is synonymous with Cacicus cristatus. Wood 1889 calls Cacicus cristatus the crested cassique. Lydekker 1895 names the same bird Ostinops decumanus, now the crested oropendola or Psarocolius decumanus. The name Oriolus cristatus was also given by Pennant to a bird in Madras, India in Forster's 1781 list of Indian birds.) The sample was obtained from Santos, Brazil, parasitizing a New World oriole.	Numerous fine hooks on the bulb-shaped proboscis, as well as the different host and location, distinguish it from A. hemignathi.
Apororhynchus amphistomi Byrd and Denton, 1949	The species name amphistomi derives from a superficial resemblance to the amphistomate trematodes (flukes with stoma on opposite sides). It the third species in its genus to be discovered, and the first species in its genus to be discovered in North America.	The Canada warbler is one of the hosts of A. amphistomi Distribution map of the Canada warbler with breeding (yellow) and wintering (blue) ranges. The northern parula is one of the hosts of A. amphistomi Distribution map of the northern parula with breeding (yellow) and wintering (blue) ranges. The parasite was discovered in the summer of 1947 infesting a Canada warbler (Cardellina canadensis formerly Wilsonia canadensis) in Mountain Lake, Virginia, and a northern parula (Setophaga americana formerly Compsothlyphis americana) in Augusta, Georgia.	A. amphistomi was found in the digestive tract, just inside the vent. On the proboscis, there are approximately 20 very fine hooks found on each of 40 rows. The two lemnisci are longer than the body length and are folded in the body cavity. Females are 2.13 mm long by 0.83 mm in maximum width and the proboscis is 0.36 mm long by 0.44 mm in maximum width. The male is smaller being 1.43 mm long by 0.53 mm in maximum width and the proboscis is 0.44 mm long by 0.74 mm in maximum width.
Apororhynchus chauhani Sen, 1975	A. chauhani was named after Birendra Singh Chauhan, a member of the Zoological Society of India.	The spotted owlet is a host of A. chauhani Distribution map of the spotted owlet A. chauhani is the only Apororhynchus species described from India. It was discovered in Srisailam, Andhra Pradesh, in 1975. It parasitizes the spotted owlet (Athene brama)	The body is 4.70 mm by 1.70 mm long with a proboscis that is 1.11 mm by 1.68 mm in length and immature eggs are around 0.015 mm to 0.035 mm in diameter. The hooks on the proboscis are finger shaped and numerous, especially in the posterior. The rest of the hooks on the anterior side are irregularly directed and sparse. It was and has been found in the intestine. The proboscis sheath is absent. The nerve ganglion is large and located near the anterior proboscis. The lemnisci are very long and unequal.
Apororhynchus hemignathi (Shipley, 1896) (Note: Origninally named Arhynchus hemignathi by Shipley in 1899, it was later renamed toApororhynchus by Shipley later in 1899 due to the name Arhynchus having been used by Dejean in 1834 for a beetle.)	Apororhynchus hemignathi was originally named Arhynchus hemignathi by Arthur Shipley in 1896 and renamed (also by Shipley) in 1899. It is synonymous with Neorhynchus hemignathi (Shipley, 1896) de Marval, 1905. A. hemignathi was named after the genus of the Kauaʻi ʻakialoa, which was Hemignathus at the time of the description. It is the type species for the genus.	It has been found in Kauaʻi, Hawaii, parasitizing the now extinct Kauaʻi ʻakialoa (Akialoa stejnegeri).	Specimens range from 2.5 mm to 3.5 mm long, distended 1 mm to 1.5 mm longer. It has two to four nuclei in the lemnisci.
Apororhynchus paulonucleatus Khokhlova and Cimbaluk, 1966	It was described in 1966.	The black-winged pratincole is a host of A. paulonucleatus Distribution map of the black-winged pratincole with breeding (orange), non-breeding (blue), and migration (yellow) ranges. The eastern yellow wagtail is also a host of A. paulonucleatus Distribution map of the eastern yellow wagtail with breeding (orange) and non-breeding (blue) ranges. This parasite has been found in the black-winged pratincole (Glareola nordmanni) at Malye Chany Lake, in Russia, and in the colon and cloaca of the eastern yellow wagtail (Motacilla tschutschensis) in Chukotka and Kamchatka (including the Karaginsky Island), also in Russia.	The proboscis is large compared to the body and spherical. It is armed with 10–12 spiral rows of hooks with 14–15 hooks in each row. The hook has a thin blade with a curved tip and root thickened with broadened base. In the body, there are 10–16 giant nuclei with a diameter of 0.050–0.077 mm. There is a very short neck (0.153 mm long) between the proboscis and the body with attached ribbon-like lemnisci longer than their own body length. Females are 3.7 mm long by 0.92 mm in maximum width and the proboscis is 1.30 mm long by 1.53 mm in maximum width. The male is smaller being 3.21 mm long by 0.766 mm in maximum width and the proboscis is 0.796 mm long by 0.995 mm in maximum width. The eggs were oval shaped with three concentric shells around 0.074–0.080 mm long and 0.040–0.043 mm wide.
Apororhynchus silesiacus Okulewicz and Maruszewski, 1980	Described in 1980, it is the most recently classified species of the Apororhynchus. A. silesiacus is named after Silesia, a region in Poland where the parasite was found.	The European robin is one of the hosts of A. silesiacus Distribution map of the common nightingale with breeding (green), resident (dark green), non-breeding (blue), and introduced but likely extinct (pink) ranges. The thrush nightingale is one of the hosts of A. silesiacus Distribution map of the common nightingale with the breeding/summer (orange) range, non-breeding/winter (yellow) range. The common nightingale is one of the hosts of A. silesiacus Distribution map of the common nightingale with breeding (green) and wintering (blue) ranges. A. silesiacus was found in the cloaca of the European robin (Erithacus rubecula), the thrush nightingale (Luscinia luscinia) and the common nightingale (Luscinia megarhynchos) in Wrocław, Poland, and of the European robin in Alsóperepuszta, Hungary. The parasite has been found infesting juvenile European robins, indicating that the infestation occurred in the nesting area.	Specimens were between 3.21 and 3.51 mm in total length, with a maximum width of 0.80 to 1.05 mm at middle and the eggs were around 0.07 mm long and 0.035 mm wide. It has a proboscis wider than the anterior part of the trunk, with about 40 spiral rows of hooks, each row bearing 14 to 16 hooks. There are 28 to 31 giant nuclei in the body wall and 9 to 12 in the lemnisci. The testes are almost parallel.

== Distribution ==
Worldwide distribution of Apororhynchus samples collected in the field

The genus Apororhynchus exhibits a wide but highly disjunct global distribution, with documented records spanning North America, South America, Europe, Asia, and the Hawaiian Islands. Because these parasites are infrequently encountered during field studies, their known geographic ranges are poorly understood but must be within the range of their avian hosts.

- Apororhynchus aculeatus is described from samples obtained from Santos, Brazil on the Atlantic coast of South America.
- Apororhynchus amphistomi is native to eastern North America. Specimens have been collected from avian hosts in the southeastern United States: Mountain Lake, Virginia, and Augusta, Georgia.
- Apororhynchus chauhani represents the only species within the genus described from the Indomalayan realm. Its distribution is known exclusively from Srisailam in the state of Andhra Pradesh, India.
- Apororhynchus hemignathi was found in the Hawaiian Islands. A sample was collected from the now-extinct Kauaʻi ʻakialoa (Akialoa stejnegeri) on the island of Kauaʻi.
- Apororhynchus paulonucleatus samples have been collected across a wide range across northern and eastern Russia. Documented collection sites include Malye Chany Lake in western Siberia, as well as Chukotka, the Kamchatka Peninsula, and Karaginsky Island in the Russian Far East.
- Apororhynchus silesiacus was found in two regions of Central Europe. The species was originally described from Wrocław, Poland, and its documented range includes the Alsóperepuszta (also called the Alsópere) within the Bakony region of Hungary.

== Hosts and pathology ==
Life cycle of Acanthocephala (Note: A 2001 survey of the literature found no known cases of human infection by Apororhynchus species.)

The specific life cycles of Apororhynchus species are unknown, but the life cycle of acanthocephala (thorny-headed worms) in general unfolds in three distinct stages. It begins when an egg develops into an infective form known as an acanthor. This acanthor is released with the feces of its definitive host, typically a vertebrate, and must be ingested by an intermediate host, an arthropod such as an insect, to continue its development. Although the specific intermediate hosts for the genus Apororhynchus are unidentified, it is generally accepted that insects serve as the primary intermediaries.

Inside the intermediate host, the acanthor molts its outer layer, becoming an acanthella (the immature larval stage). At this stage it burrows into the host's intestinal wall and continues to grow. The life cycle culminates in the formation of a cystacanth, a larval stage able to infect the definitive host while retaining juvenile features (differing from the adult only in size and stage of sexual development), which awaits ingestion by the definitive host to mature fully. Once inside the definitive host, these larvae attach themselves to the intestinal wall using the hooks on their proboscis, mature into sexually reproductive adults, and complete the cycle by releasing new acanthors into the host's feces.

Apororhynchus species exclusively parasitize avian hosts of different orders including owls, waders, and passerines. The parasite attaches to the cloaca and in some cases the intestinal wall using a hook-covered proboscis. Infestation can cause enteritis and anemia in Hawaiian honeycreepers. A survey of the medical literature published in 2021 did not list any Apororhynchus species as infesting humans.
