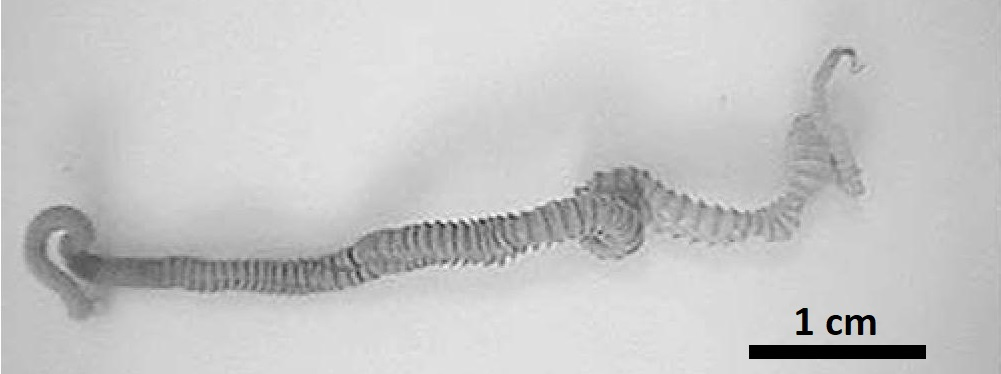
- Gigantorhynchus ortizi

Scientific classification
- Kingdom: Animalia
- Phylum: Acanthocephala
- Class: Archiacanthocephala
- Order: Gigantorhynchida; Southwell and Macfie, 1925
- Family: Gigantorhynchidae; Hamann, 1892

= Gigantorhynchidae =

Order of thorny-headed worms

Gigantorhynchida is an order containing a single family, Gigantorhynchidae of Acanthocephala (thorny-headed worms, also known as spiny-headed worms) that parasitize vertebrates by attaching themselves to the intestinal wall of their host. There are over 60 species classified into three genera in Gigantorhynchida: Gigantorhynchus, Intraproboscis, and Mediorhynchus.

== Taxonomy ==
Archiacanthocephala

- Archiacanthocephala
  - Oligacanthorhynchidae
    - Macracanthorhynchus ingens
    - Oncicola venezuelensis
    - Oligacanthorhynchus tortuosa
    - Nephridiacanthus major
  - - Moniliformidae
      Moniliformis moniliformis
    - Gigantorhynchida
      - Mediorhynchus sp.
      - Gigantorhynchus echinodiscus

Phylogenetic reconstruction for select species in the class Archiacanthocephala

Phylogenetically, the family Gigantorhynchidae is sister to the family Moniliformidae, represented by sequences of Moniliformis Moniliformis that form a supported monophyletic group. The group formed by Gigantorhynchidae and Moniliformidae suggest it to be a sister to the group formed by sequences of Macracanthorhynchus ingens and Oncicola venezuelensis A new taxonomic analysis has been performed.

== Genera ==
Gigantorhynchida contains three genera.

=== Gigantorhynchus ===
The genus Gigantorhynchus contains six species with G. echinodiscus as the type species. It was described by Hamann in 1892. The genus Gigantorhynchus is characterized by the presence of a cylindrical proboscis with a crown of robust hooks at the apex followed by numerous small hooks on the rest of the proboscis. The body, or trunk, is long with pseudosegmentation, the lemnisci are filiform, and the testes are ellipsoid. Species of Gigantorhynchus are distinguished based on the number and size of hooks on the crown of the proboscis, the type of pseudosegmentation, and size of the ellipsoid eggs. Males of all species possess eight cement glands which are used to temporarily close the posterior end of the female after copulation. There is pronounced sexual dimorphism with the female often two or more times longer than the male. Gigantorhynchus species infest marsupials and myrmecophagids (anteaters) in Central and South America.

=== Intraproboscis ===
The genus Intraproboscis contains a single species, Intraproboscis sanghae. The genus and species were described by Amin, Heckmann, Sist, and Basso in 2021. The genus Intraproboscis closely resembles the genus Mediorhynchus but is characterized by six distinct features: infesting mammals instead of birds, a simple proboscis receptacle (a complex structure for housing the proboscis when retracted) that is completely suspended within the proboscis, proboscis retractor muscles that pass through the proboscis receptacle and into the body cavity posteriorly, no neck, and a parareceptacle structure and a uterine vesicle which are both absent in Mediorhynchus. There is pronounced sexual dimorphism with the female larger than the male. I. sanghae infests the black-bellied pangolin (Phataginus tetradactyla) and the tree pangolin (Phataginus tricuspis) both in Central Africa.

=== Mediorhynchus ===
Mediorhynchus Van Cleave, 1916 contains at least 59 species.

== Distribution ==
Gigantorhynchus is found in mammals in South America and baboons in Africa. Intraproboscis is found in mammals in Africa, and Mediorhynchus is found in birds worldwide.
