= Nephridiacanthus =

Scientific classification
- Kingdom: Animalia
- Phylum: Acanthocephala
- Class: Archiacanthocephala
- Order: Oligacanthorhynchida
- Family: Oligacanthorhynchidae
- Genus: Nephridiacanthus; Meyer, 1931

Synonyms
- Nephridiorhynchus Meyer, 1931

Genus of worms

Nephridiacanthus is a genus of parasitic worms belonging to the family Oligacanthorhynchidae.

The species of this genus are found in Africa.

== Taxonomy ==
Phylogenetic analysis has been conducted on one of the species in the genus, N. major.

Archiacanthocephala

- Archiacanthocephala
  - Oligacanthorhynchidae
    - Macracanthorhynchus ingens
    - Oncicola venezuelensis
    - Oligacanthorhynchus tortuosa
    - Nephridiacanthus major
    - Pachysentis canicola
  - - Moniliformidae
      Moniliformis moniliformis
    - Gigantorhynchida
      - Mediorhynchus sp.
      - Gigantorhynchus echinodiscus

Phylogenetic reconstruction for select species in the class Archiacanthocephala based on a 28S rRNA gene comparison from Gomes et al. (2019) and a 18S rDNA gene comparison from Amin and colleagues (2020). Amin and colleagues (2022) used the 18S rDNA gene and ITS1-5.8-ITS2 region of ribosomal RNA comparisons to add P. canicola phylogenetically to the family Oligacanthorhynchidae.

== Species ==
There are eight species in the genus Nephridiacanthus. (Note: A binomial authority in parentheses indicates that the species was originally described in a genus other than the present genus.)

- Nephridiacanthus gerberi Baer, 1959
- Nephridiacanthus kamerunensis Meyer, 1931
- Nephridiacanthus longissimus Golvan, 1962
- Nephridiacanthus major (Bremser, 1811)

N. major has been found infesting the long-eared hedgehog (Hemiechinus auritus) and the southern white-breasted hedgehog (Erinaceus concolor) in Iran, Germany, Morocco, central Asia, Egypt, Bulgaria, Tajikistan, Lebanon, Sicily, Italy, Nigeria, Turkey and Mongolia. Phylogenetic analysis has been done on the small subunit ribosomal DNA and cytochrome c genes, and have determined that it belongs to the family Oligacanthorhynchidae.

- Nephridiacanthus manisensis Meyer, 1931
- Nephridiacanthus maroccanus Dollfus, 1951
- Nephridiacanthus palawanensis (Tubangui & Masiluñgan, 1938)
- Nephridiacanthus thapari (Sen & Chauhan, 1972)

== Hosts ==
Life cycle of Acanthocephala. (Note: There are no known aberrant human infections for Nephridiacanthus species.)

The life cycle of an acanthocephalan consists of three stages beginning when an infective acanthor (development of an egg) is released from the intestines of the definitive host and then ingested by an arthropod, the intermediate host. The intermediate hosts of Nephridiacanthus include ?. When the acanthor molts, the second stage called the acanthella begins. This stage involves penetrating the wall of the mesenteron or the intestine of the intermediate host and growing. The final stage is the infective cystacanth which is the larval or juvenile state of an Acanthocephalan, differing from the adult only in size and stage of sexual development. The cystacanths within the intermediate hosts are consumed by the definitive host, usually attaching to the walls of the intestines, and as adults they reproduce sexually in the intestines. The acanthor are passed in the feces of the definitive host and the cycle repeats. There are no known paratenic hosts (hosts where parasites infest but do not undergo larval development or sexual reproduction) for Nephridiacanthus.

Hosts for Nephridiacanthus

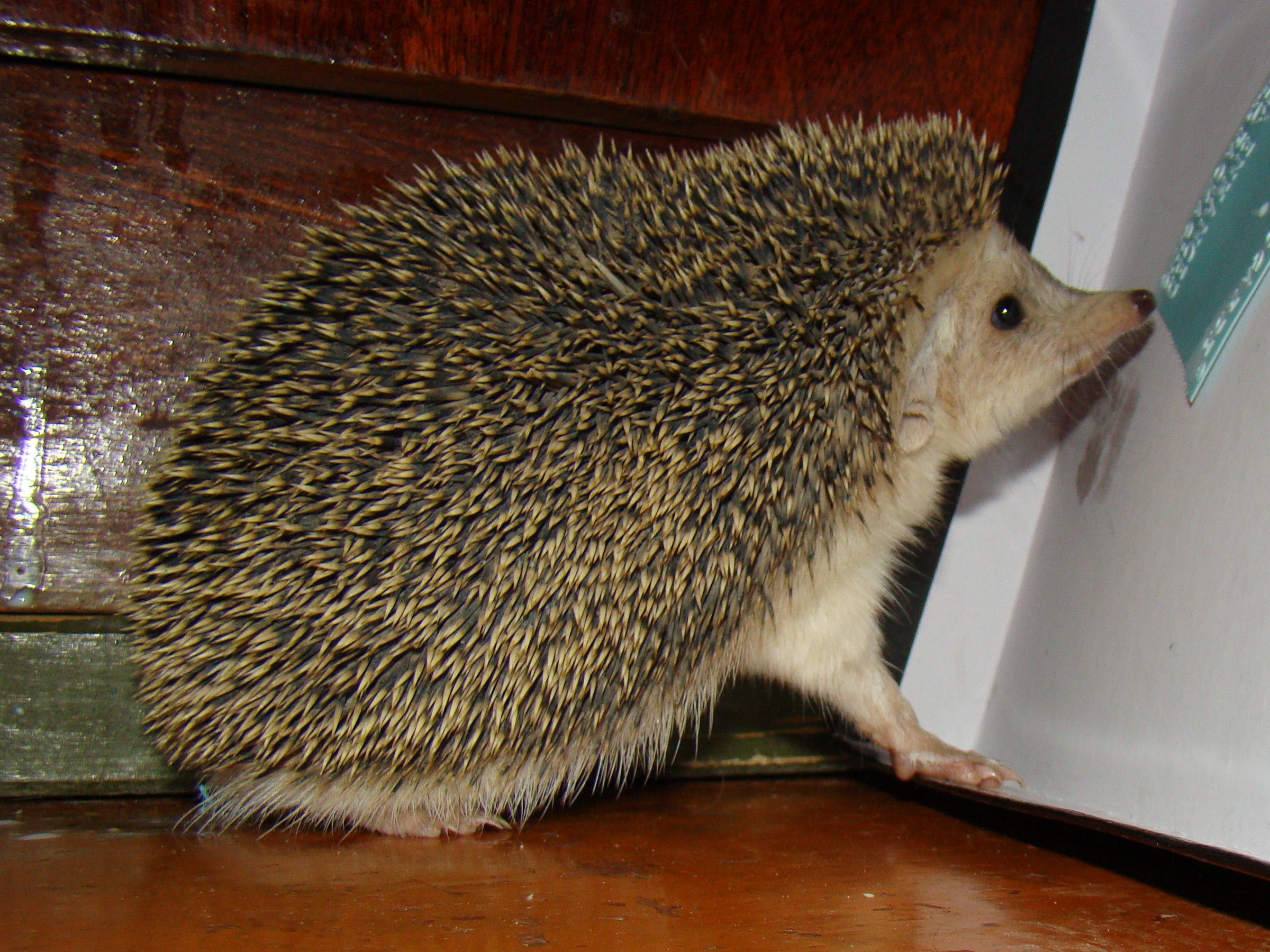
The Long-eared hedgehog is a host of N. major
