= Oncicola =

Scientific classification
- Kingdom: Animalia
- Phylum: Acanthocephala
- Class: Archiacanthocephala
- Order: Oligacanthorhynchida
- Family: Oligacanthorhynchidae
- Genus: Oncicola; Travassos, 1916

Genus of worms

Oncicola is a genus of parasitic worms belonging to the family Oligacanthorhynchidae. Oncicola belongs to the phylum Acanthocephalans that include many thorny-headed worms. This family contains 12 genera including the genus Oncicola. Oncicola is a part of the phylum Acanthocephalans that include many thorny-headed worms. The name comes from the prefix onc- meaning “barbed” and -cola meaning “to inhabit” in Latin. It was named and discovered in 1916 by Travassos. These worms are defined by their parasitic nature which involves hook structures found at their front end.

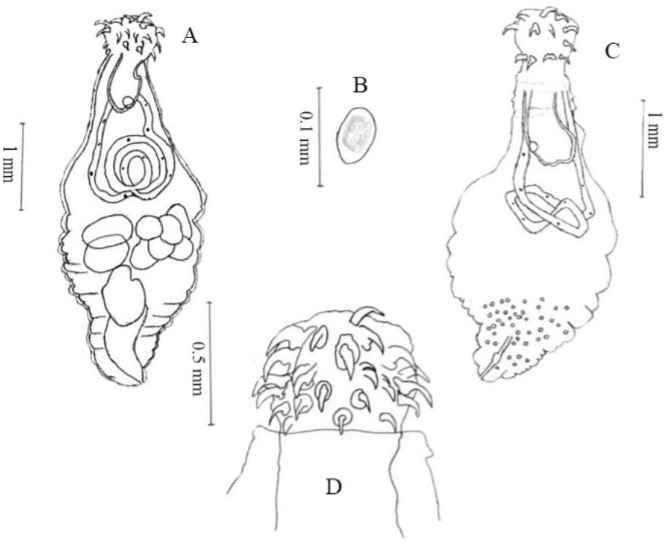
Four images depicting the structures of an adult Oncicola venezuelensis worm from research performed in Brazil.

== Taxonomy ==
Phylogenetic analysis has been conducted on one of the species in the genus, O. venezuelensis.

Archiacanthocephala

- Archiacanthocephala
  - Oligacanthorhynchidae
    - Macracanthorhynchus ingens
    - Oncicola venezuelensis
    - Oligacanthorhynchus tortuosa
    - Nephridiacanthus major
    - Pachysentis canicola
  - - Moniliformidae
      Moniliformis moniliformis
    - Gigantorhynchida
      - Mediorhynchus sp.
      - Gigantorhynchus echinodiscus

Phylogenetic reconstruction for select species in the class Archiacanthocephala based on a 28S rRNA gene comparison from Gomes et al. (2019) and a 18S rDNA gene comparison from Amin and colleagues (2020). Amin and colleagues (2022) used the 18S rDNA gene and ITS1-5.8-ITS2 region of ribosomal RNA comparisons to add P. canicola phylogenetically to the family Oligacanthorhynchidae.

== Description ==
Each worm is around 8–15 mm long with males typically being smaller than the females. They are typically white to yellow in color and globular shaped. They have a short proboscis at the front of the body with around 36 small hooks that vary in shape and size. These hooks are arranged into six rows with six hooks in each, and the proboscis itself varies in size from worm to worm. They also appear wrinkled along their body, and their body gets thinner towards the tail end. They have a cuticle, hypodermal layer with lacunar canals (which gives them the wrinkled appearance), and a long ribbon-like lemniscus that extends to the posterior end of the organism. Not much is known about the importance of the lemniscus, but it is thought that it aids in the transport of fluids to the proboscis and houses secondary sensory fibers. They are long structures that occupy a large part of the worm’s body, and they are largest in females. The cuticle is tough but flexible and protects the worm from its external environment and predation. In some senses it acts as an external skeleton for this animal. For many worms a new cuticle is made, and the old cuticle is sloughed off at each larval stage which allows the worm to grow. The hypodermal layer functions similar to that of vertebrates. It provides insulation, more protection, and a sink for excess energy. The worm lacks a digestive tract, a pseudocoelom, and reproductive organs as juveniles, but these features form as they grow into the adult form.

== Species ==
The genus Oncicola Travassos, 1916 contains 24 known species. (Note: A binomial authority in parentheses indicates that the species was originally described in a genus other than the present genus.)

- Oncicola campanulata (Diesing, 1851)
- Oncicola canis (Kaupp, 1909)

O. canis was found infesting the Red fox (Vulpes vulpes) in Iran.

- Oncicola chibigouzouensis Machado-Filho, 1963
- Oncicola confusa (Machado-Filho, 1950)
- Oncicola dimorpha Meyer, 1931
- Oncicola freitasi (Machado-Filho, 1950)
- Oncicola gigas Meyer, 1931
- Oncicola justatesticularis (Machado-Filho, 1950)
- Oncicola luehei (Travassos, 1917)

The complete mitochondrial genome of O. luehei has been sequenced.

- Oncicola machadoi Schmidt, 1917
- Oncicola macrurae Meyer, 1931
- Oncicola magalhaesi Machado-Filho, 1962
- Oncicola malayanus Toumanoff, 1947
- Oncicola martini Schmidt, 1977
- Oncicola michaelseni Meyer, 1932
- Oncicola micracantha Machado-Filho, 1949
- Oncicola oncicola (von Ihering, 1892)
- Oncicola paracampanulata' Machado-Filho, 1963
- Oncicola pomatostomi (Johnston and Cleland, 1912)
- Oncicola schacheri Schmidt, 1972

O. schacheri is named after the collector of the samples Dr. John F. Schacher. It was found in the small intestines of around 20% of foxes (Vulpes vulpes, palestina subspecies) and juveniles were also found in the mesentaries of a badger (Meles meles) and are considered incidental hosts. All samples were collected in Lebanon. There is no marked sexual dimorphism apart from a small size difference: males were between 30.0 and 39.0 mm long and females were 39.0 to 44.0 mm long. There are twelve regularly alternative longitudinal rows of 3 hooks each. The hooks vary in size between 95 and 210 microns.

- Oncicola signoides (Meyer, 1932)
- Oncicola spirula (Olferas, 1819)

South American species that is common in captive primates.

- Oncicola travassosi Witenberg, 1938
- Oncicola venezuelensis Marteau, 1977

This species was described by a sample infecting the intestine of the ocelot (Leopardus pardalis) in Venezuela, where it gets its name. It differs from other species of the genus mainly by its longer lemnisci which have six nuclei. There is no sexual dimorphism, with males ranging in length from 13.5 to 14.4 mm (without proboscis) and 2 mm maximum width and females ranging in length from 15 to 16 mm (also without proboscis) with a maximum width of 1.9 to 2.2 mm.

Cystacanths of O. venezuelensis are present in the hemocoel of Caribbean termites (Nasutitermes acajutlae) from St. Thomas and St. John islands in the U.S. Virgin Islands as an intermediate host. Cystacanths were present in Other intermediate hosts including in subcutaneous nodules of lizards (Anolis cristatellus and Anolis stratulus), in the greater omentum of small Indian mongooses (Urva auropunctata), and embedded in mesenteries of pearly-eyed thrashers (Margarops fuscatus). The host from the U.S. Virgin Islands is yet to be determined.

== Distribution ==
The species of this genus are found in America and Australia. They have been found and documented in Brazil, the U.S. Virgin Islands, and the Caribbean Island of St. Kitts. There have been seven recorded sightings of Oncicola in Australia, mainly in the south of the country near the coast.

== Hosts ==
Species belonging to the genus Oncicola can make a host of a wide variety of animals. They parasitize carnivorous mammals (such as armadillos, mongooses, feral cats, etc) and birds with Oncicola canis and Oncicola venezuelenis being the most prevalent species. The worms have been found in the abdominal wall, vaginal cavity, peritoneal cavity, and pericardium of both male and female hosts, typically of young adult age or older. Oncicola canis, specifically, can be found in the small intestine of dogs and cats. The worms use the hooks within their proboscis to attach deep to the intestinal wall of their host, most of the time they penetrate the muscle layer. Then they absorb nutrients through their body wall and lacunar channels on the hypodermis. Infections by this worm seem to cause little clinical symptoms, but some can cause moderate inflammation, mineralization, hemorrhaging, and fibrosis in some connective tissues within the host. Some hosts have also been found to have lymphocytes with fewer plasma cells. Although rare, infections by Oncicola could potentially cause problems in the host’s reproductive system because of the inflammation and fibrosis the parasite can cause. The eggs of this organism are typically found within the feces of the host, which is how they are spread, and they can be discovered using flotation techniques such as zinc sulfate treatments and Sheather’s sugar.

The life cycle begins as females lay thick-shelled oval eggs that are brown in color and around 43-50 x 67-72 mcm. They have delicate and clear external shell membranes and can survive a multitude of environmental conditions and for several months without being in a host. These eggs are normally found within the feces of the host containing the female worm. Dung beetles, or other paratenic hosts, may interact with the larvae and become intermediate hosts when they feed on egg-containing manure or soil. Inside the intestine of these hosts, or within the soil or manure, the larvae, also called the acanthor, develops into an acanthella. This maturation continues as the acanthella proceeds to the infective stage called a cystacanth. The cystacanth is the form that will infect a permanent host that will be used during reproduction; thus, this form is the most mature structurally and has all structures found in adult Oncicola. From here, the intermediate host may end up in an environment that is not suitable for the parasite’s life cycle. If this occurs, the development stops, but the cystacanth remains infective, waiting for better conditions to be present. If a more suitable host is not found, the worm’s life will end within the intermediate host, and no offspring will be produced. If the intermediate host is eaten by a definitive host, such as a dog, pig, fox, or cat, the life cycle can be completed. The worm will attach itself to the gut wall of the host, and if it is female, it will produce offspring that pass into the hosts feces.
