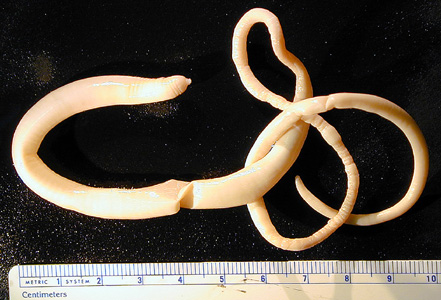
- Adult Macracanthorhynchus hirudinaceus

Scientific classification
- Kingdom: Animalia
- Phylum: Acanthocephala
- Class: Archiacanthocephala
- Order: Oligacanthorhynchida
- Family: Oligacanthorhynchidae
- Genus: Macracanthorhynchus; Trevassos, 1917

Species
- M. catulinus Kostylev, 1927; M. erinacei Dollfus, 1953; M. hirudinaceus (Pallas, 1781); M. ingens (Linstow, 1879)

= Macracanthorhynchus =

Genus of thorny-headed worms

Macracanthorhynchus, also known as the giant thorny-headed worm of swine, is a member of the Oligacanthorhynchidae which contains four species.

== Taxonomy ==
Phylogenetic analysis has been conducted on at least one of the four species in the genus, M. ingens, and confirms that this species belongs to the family Oligacanthorhynchidae. The type species is M. hirudinaceus.

Archiacanthocephala

- Archiacanthocephala
  - Oligacanthorhynchidae
    - Macracanthorhynchus ingens
    - Oncicola venezuelensis
    - Oligacanthorhynchus tortuosa
    - Nephridiacanthus major
    - Pachysentis canicola
  - - Moniliformidae
      Moniliformis moniliformis
    - Gigantorhynchida
      - Mediorhynchus sp.
      - Gigantorhynchus echinodiscus

Phylogenetic reconstruction for select species in the class Archiacanthocephala based on a 28S rRNA gene comparison from Gomes et al. (2019) and a 18S rDNA gene comparison from Amin et al. (2020). Amin et al. (2022) used the 18S rDNA gene and ITS1-5.8-ITS2 region of ribosomal RNA comparisons to add P. canicola phylogenetically to the family Oligacanthorhynchidae.

== Description ==
Macracanthorhynchus consists of a proboscis covered in hooks and a long trunk.

== Species ==
There are four species in the genus Macracanthorhynchus. (Note: A binomial authority in parentheses indicates that the species was originally described in a genus other than the present genus.)

- Macracanthorhynchus catulinus Kostylev, 1927

The encysted larvae of M. catulinus beetle Adesmia gebleri from the Kara Kum region are 6.32 mm long and have a proboscis 0.57 mm long with 12 longitudinal rows of three hooks each. The size of the hooks varies from 0.25 mm to 0.11 mm. Small vertebrates, such as the badger and weasel may be reservoir hosts. Pre-acanthellae and acanthellae of M. catulinus were found infesting Tentyria tessulataAzerbeijan, and acanthellae were found in the paratenic hosts, Sheltopusik (Ophisaurus apodus), Coluber jugularis, Agama caucasica, Eumeces schneideri, Eremias pleskei, Lacerta strigata and the Marsh frog (Pelophylax ridibundus).

- Macracanthorhynchus erinacei Dollfus, 1953
- Macracanthorhynchus hirudinaceus (Pallas, 1781)

M. hirudinaceus is a parasite which lives in the intestines of pigs and other suids, and very occasionally in humans or dogs. It causes enteritis, gastritis or peritonitis. Its life cycle includes beetles of the genus Melolontha as intermediate hosts. This species has many synonyms which include: Echinorhynchus gigas (Block, 1782), Macracanthorhynchus gigas (Block, 1782), Echinorhynchus hirundinacea (Palas, 1781), Gigantorhynchus hirundinaceus (Pallas, 1781), Gigantorhynchus gigas (Block, 1782), Hormorhynchus gigas (Block, 1782), Taenia haeruca (Pallas, 1776), and Taenia hirundinaceus (Pallas, 1781) The complete mitochondrial genome of M. hirudinaceus has been sequenced. The eggs have 4 membranes are 98 um long and have an elongation ratio of 1.85.

- Macracanthorhynchus ingens (Linstow, 1879)

The eggs have three membranes, are 94 um long and have an elongation ratio of 1.66. It parasitizes the raccoon (Procyon lotor) in the United States.

== Hosts and pathology ==
Life cycle of Acanthocephala (Note: A 2001 survey of the literature found many cases of human infection by several Macracanthorhynchus species.)

The life cycle of acanthocephala (thorny-headed worms) in general unfolds in three distinct stages. It begins when an egg develops into an infective form known as an acanthor. This acanthor is released with the feces of its definitive host, typically a vertebrate, and must be ingested by an intermediate host, an arthropod such as an insect, to continue its development. Although the specific intermediate hosts for all species of the genus Macracanthorhynchus are unidentified, it is generally accepted that insects serve as the primary intermediaries as they make up the diet of the host.

Inside the intermediate host, the acanthor molts its outer layer, becoming an acanthella (the immature larval stage). At this stage it burrows into the host's intestinal wall and continues to grow. The life cycle culminates in the formation of a cystacanth, a larval stage able to infect the definitive host while retaining juvenile features (differing from the adult only in size and stage of sexual development), which awaits ingestion by the definitive host to mature fully. Once inside the definitive host, these larvae attach themselves to the intestinal wall using the hooks on their proboscis, mature into sexually reproductive adults, and complete the cycle by releasing new acanthors into the host's feces.

A survey of the medical literature published in 2021 found most documented cases of human acanthocephaliasis are caused by Macracanthorhynchus hirudinaceus, Macracanthorhynchus ingens.

Hosts for Macracanthorhynchus

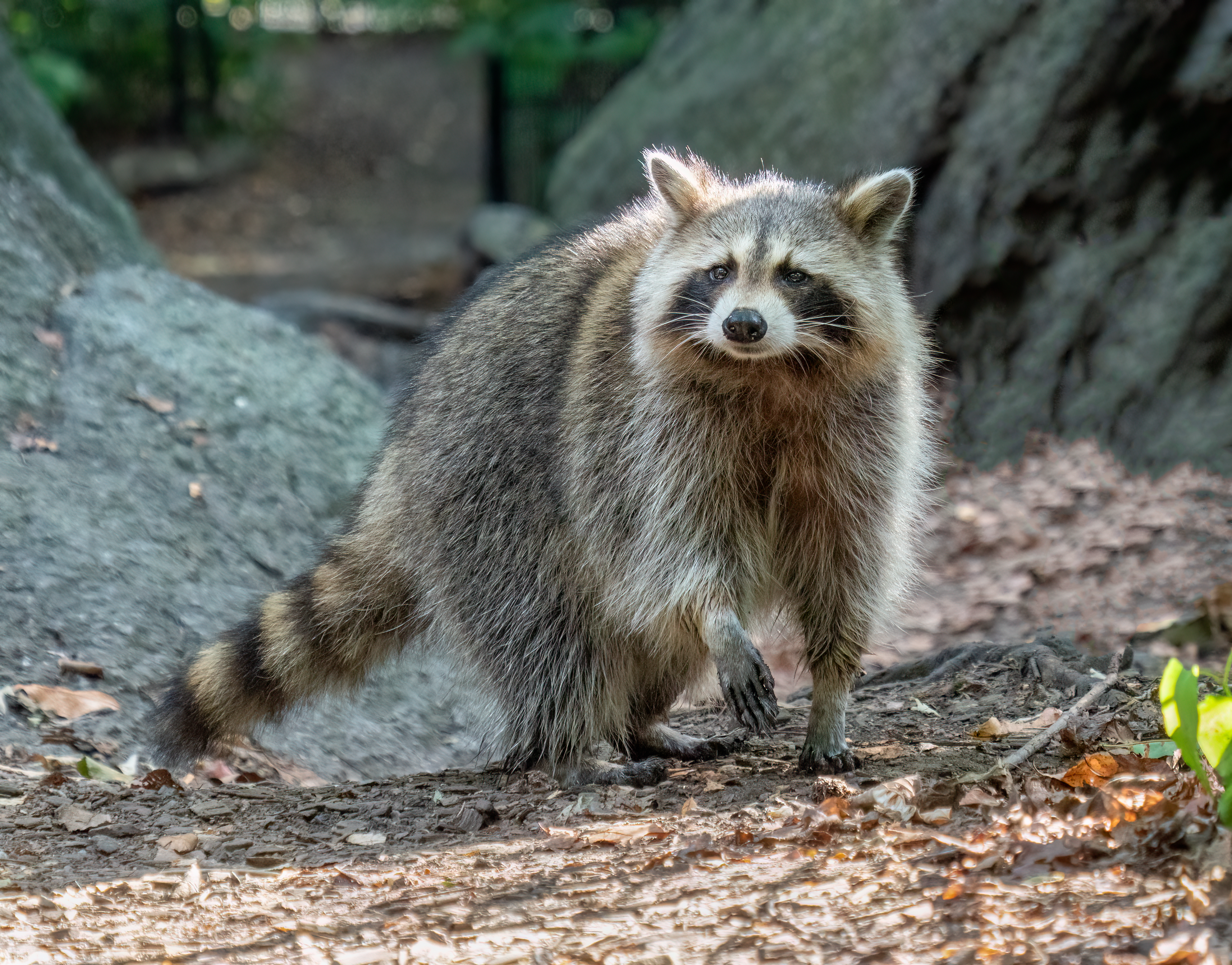
The racoon is a host of M. ingens
