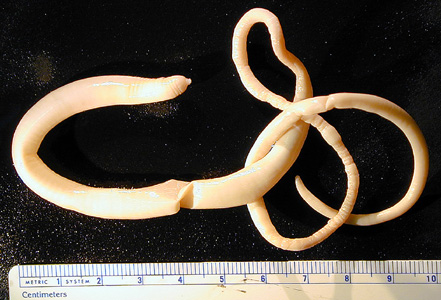
- Adult Macracanthorhynchus hirudinaceus

Scientific classification
- Kingdom: Animalia
- Phylum: Acanthocephala
- Class: Archiacanthocephala
- Order: Oligacanthorhynchida
- Family: Oligacanthorhynchidae; Petrochenko, 1956

= Oligacanthorhynchidae =

Order of thorny-headed worms

Oligacanthorhynchida is an order containing a single parasitic worm family, Oligacanthorhynchidae, that attach themselves to the intestinal wall of terrestrial vertebrates.

== Taxonomy and description ==
Archiacanthocephala

- Archiacanthocephala
  - Oligacanthorhynchidae
    - Macracanthorhynchus ingens
    - Oncicola venezuelensis
    - Oligacanthorhynchus tortuosa
    - Nephridiacanthus major
    - Pachysentis canicola
  - - Moniliformidae
      Moniliformis moniliformis
    - Gigantorhynchida
      - Mediorhynchus sp.
      - Gigantorhynchus echinodiscus

Phylogenetic reconstruction for select species in the class Archiacanthocephala based on a 28S rRNA gene comparison from Gomes et al. (2019) and a 18S rDNA gene comparison from Amin et al. (2020). Amin et al. (2022) used the 18S rDNA gene and ITS1-5.8-ITS2 region of ribosomal RNA comparisons to add P. canicola phylogenetically to the family Oligacanthorhynchidae.

== Genera ==
Oligacanthorhynchida contains twelve genera. (Note: A binomial authority in parentheses indicates that the species was originally described in a genus other than the present genus.)

=== Cucullanorhynchus ===
The genus Cucullanorhynchus Amin, Ha and Heckmann, 2008 is named for the anterior hood. It was described in 2008 based on samples collected from the intestines of mammals between 1998 and 2004 in Vietnam. C. constrictruncatus is the only species in the genus. It has been found in the intestine of the leopard (Panthera pardus) in Vietnam. The trunk has an anterior hood in both sexes and a posterior constriction in females. The species name derives from this constriction near the posterior end of females.

=== Heptamegacanthus ===
Heptamegacanthus is a monotypic genus with Heptamegacanthus niekerki being the only species. The genus and species were described by Spencer-Jones in 1990. It is a parasite of the endangered giant golden mole (Chrysospalax trevelyani) found only in isolated forests near East London and in the Transkei, both in South Africa. On the proboscis, there are 40 to 45 of these hooks arranged in rings that are not radially symmetrical, with seven large anterior hooks. The hooks in the anterior ring are twice as large as those in the second ring and the remaining hooks decrease progressively in size posteriorly. The worms are about 4 millimetres (0.2 in) long and 2 millimetres (0.08 in) wide with minimal sexual dimorphism.

=== Macracanthorhynchus ===
The genus Macracanthorhynchus Travassos, 1917 contains four species.

=== Multisentis ===
The genus Multisentis Smales, 1997 contains one species, Multisentis myrmecobius Smales, 1997 M. myrmecobius infests the numbat (Myrmecobius fasciatus) from which it derives its species name. The intermediate host is presumed to involve termites, the main diet of the numbat. It was found in south-western Australia.

=== Neoncicola ===
The genus Neoncicola Schmidt, 1972 contains nine species. The distinguishing characteristic separating Neoncicola from these similar genera is that it possesses 30 hooks, as opposed to 36 for Oncicola and more than 36 for Pachysentis.

=== Nephridiacanthus ===
The genus Nephridiacanthus Meyer, 1931 contains eight species.

=== Oligacanthorhynchus ===
The genus Oligacanthorhynchus Travassos, 1915 contains numerous species. The trunk is cylindrical and smooth or irregularly ringed. The proboscis is generally globular being somewhat longer than it is wide and has stout hooks in left handed spiral rows, with their point obliquely cut and their root produced forwards. The proboscis receptacle consists of a thick inner wall i inserted into inside of proboscis which is shrinks along the ventral side, and a thinner outer wall inserted at base of neck. A series of intercommunicating spaces branching from two median main vessels and numerous longitudinal and circular anastomoses in the hypodermis form the lacunar system. Protonephridia are present. The lemnisci are filiform with a central canal and numerous nuclei. In the far posterior of the male, there are testes and eight cement glands used to temporarily close the posterior end of the female after copulation. The eggs are almost spherical with shells that are radially striated. Hosts include birds with snakes being the intermediate hosts.

- Oligacanthorhynchus aenigma (Reichensperger, 1922)
- Oligacanthorhynchus atratus (Meyer, 1931)
- Oligacanthorhynchus bangalorensis (Pujatti, 1951)
- Oligacanthorhynchus carinii (Travassos, 1917)
- Oligacanthorhynchus cati (Gupta and Lata, 1967)
- Oligacanthorhynchus circumplexus (Molin, 1858)
- Oligacanthorhynchus citilli (Rudolphi, 1806)
- Oligacanthorhynchus compressus (Rudolphi, 1802)
- Oligacanthorhynchus decrescens (Meyer, 1931)
- Oligacanthorhynchus erinacei (Rudolphi, 1793)
- Oligacanthorhynchus hamatus (von Linstow, 1897)
- Oligacanthorhynchus iheringi Travassos, 1917
- Oligacanthorhynchus indicus Rengaraju and Das, 1981
- Oligacanthorhynchus kamerunensis (Meyer, 1931)
- Oligacanthorhynchus kamtschaticus Hokhlova, 1966
- Oligacanthorhynchus lagenaeformis (Westrumb, 1821)
- Oligacanthorhynchus lamasi (Freitas and Costa, 1964)
- Oligacanthorhynchus lerouxi (Bisseru, 1956)
- Oligacanthorhynchus major (Machado-Filho, 1963)
- Oligacanthorhynchus manifestus (Leidy, 1851)
- Oligacanthorhynchus mariemily (Tadros, 1969)
- Oligacanthorhynchus microcephala (Rudolphi, 1819)
- Oligacanthorhynchus minor Machado-Filho, 1964
- Oligacanthorhynchus oligacanthus (Rudolphi, 1819)
- Oligacanthorhynchus oti Machado-Filho, 1964
- Oligacanthorhynchus pardalis (Westrumb, 1821)
- Oligacanthorhynchus ricinoides (Rudolphi, 1808)
- Oligacanthorhynchus shillongensis (Sen and Chauhan, 1972)
- Oligacanthorhynchus spira (Diesing, 1851)
- Oligacanthorhynchus taenioides (Diesing, 1851)
- Oligacanthorhynchus thumbi Haffner, 1939
- Oligacanthorhynchus tortuosa (Leidy, 1850)
- Oligacanthorhynchus tumidus (Van Cleve, 1947)

=== Oncicola ===
The genus Oncicola Travassos, 1916 contains many species.

- Oncicola campanulata (Diesing, 1851)
- Oncicola canis (Kaupp, 1909)
- Oncicola chibigouzouensis Machado-Filho, 1963
- Oncicola confusa (Machado-Filho, 1950)
- Oncicola dimorpha Meyer, 1931
- Oncicola freitasi (Machado-Filho, 1950)
- Oncicola gigas Meyer, 1931
- Oncicola justatesticularis (Machado-Filho, 1950)
- Oncicola luehei (Travassos, 1917)
- Oncicola machadoi Schmidt, 1917
- Oncicola macrurae Meyer, 1931
- Oncicola magalhaesi Machado-Filho, 1962
- Oncicola malayanus Toumanoff, 1947
- Oncicola martini Schmidt, 1977
- Oncicola michaelseni Meyer, 1932
- Oncicola micracantha Machado-Filho, 1949
- Oncicola oncicola (von Ihering, 1892)
- Oncicola paracampanulata' Machado-Filho, 1963
- Oncicola pomatostomi (Johnston and Cleland, 1912)
- Oncicola schacheri Schmidt, 1972
- Oncicola signoides (Meyer, 1932)
- Oncicola spirula (Olferas, 1819)
- Oncicola travassosi Witenberg, 1938
- Oncicola venezuelensis Marteau, 1977

=== Pachysentis ===
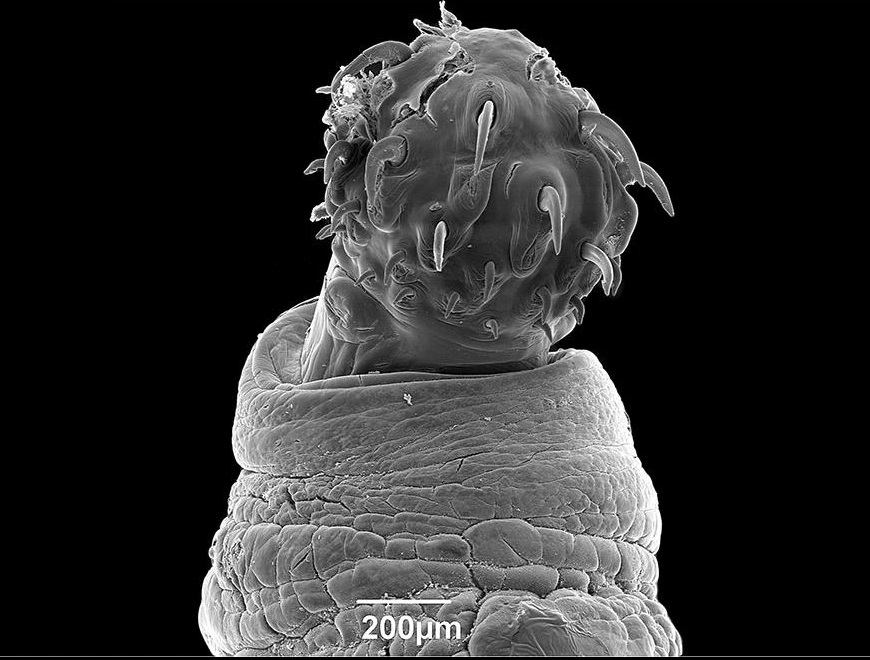
The proboscis of Pachysentis lenti.

The genus Pachysentis contains ten species with Pachysentis canicola being the type species. It was described by Meyer in 1931. They look identical to Oncicola apart from the number of hooks on the proboscis. Species of Oncicola have 36 or less hooks whereas species of Pachysentis have more. Specifically, the proboscis is not quite spherical and contains 42 to 102 hooks arranged into 12 longitudinal rows 3 to 12 hooks each. The rows may be regularly or irregularly alternating and straight or crooked. Hooks have tips with or without barbs, and the larger hooks with complex manubria and roots with the remaining spines being rootless. The trunk is fairly wide relative to the length with the anterior half usually wider than the posterior half. The testes are in tandem with at least one located before the middle of the worm. There are eight cement glands compactly arranged each with single giant nucleus used to temporarily close the posterior end of the female after copulation. The eggs have a sculptured outer membrane. Hosts include Brazilian or Egyptian carnivores. Species can be distinguished based on the number and arrangements of proboscis hooks, whether these hooks are barbed, the arrangement of the cement glands, host, and the length of lemnisci.

=== Paraprosthenorchis ===
Paraprosthenorchis Amin, Ha and Heckmann, 2008 have a trunk over 200 mm long, ornate proboscis with three non-barbed hooks in each of 16 rows. They have simple hook roots without manubria, and a large oblong horizontally posterior hook base. There are about 35 festoons. Protonephridia are gill-like and capsular. Gonopore is terminal. The primary host are Manidae in Vietnam with ants and termites as intermediate hosts. This genus is named for its nearest oligacanthorhynchid genus, Prosthenorchis. P. ornatus has been found in the intestine of the Chinese pangolin (Manis pentadactyla) collected from the Hanoi Zoological Park, Vietnam. The anterior trunk has many small festoons and proboscis hooks are inserted in elevated papillae separated by beady, near hexagonal, ornate grids. The species is named for its uniquely ornate proboscis.

=== Prosthenorchis ===
Prosthenorchis Travassos, 1915 have a trunk up to 50 mm long, a proboscis that is not ornate with three barbed hooks in each of 12 rows. They have complex hook roots with large manubria, and a small discoid posterior hook base. There are up to 23 festoons. Gonopore is subterminal. The primary host are primates in South America and Felidae in Africa with cockroaches and beetles as intermediate hosts.

=== Tchadorhynchus ===
The genus Tchadorhynchus Troncy, 1970 was erected as the single species contained within differs from related Oligacanthorhynchidae genera by morphological features of bot the adult and embryo as well as the group of hosts, hyenas, the worms parasitize. T. quentini was found parasitizing the striped hyena (Hyaena hyaena) and the spotted hyena (Crocuta crocuta) in Chad.

== Hosts ==
Oligacanthorhynchidae species parasitize mammals with insect and lizard intermediate hosts.

Hosts for Oligacanthorhynchidae species

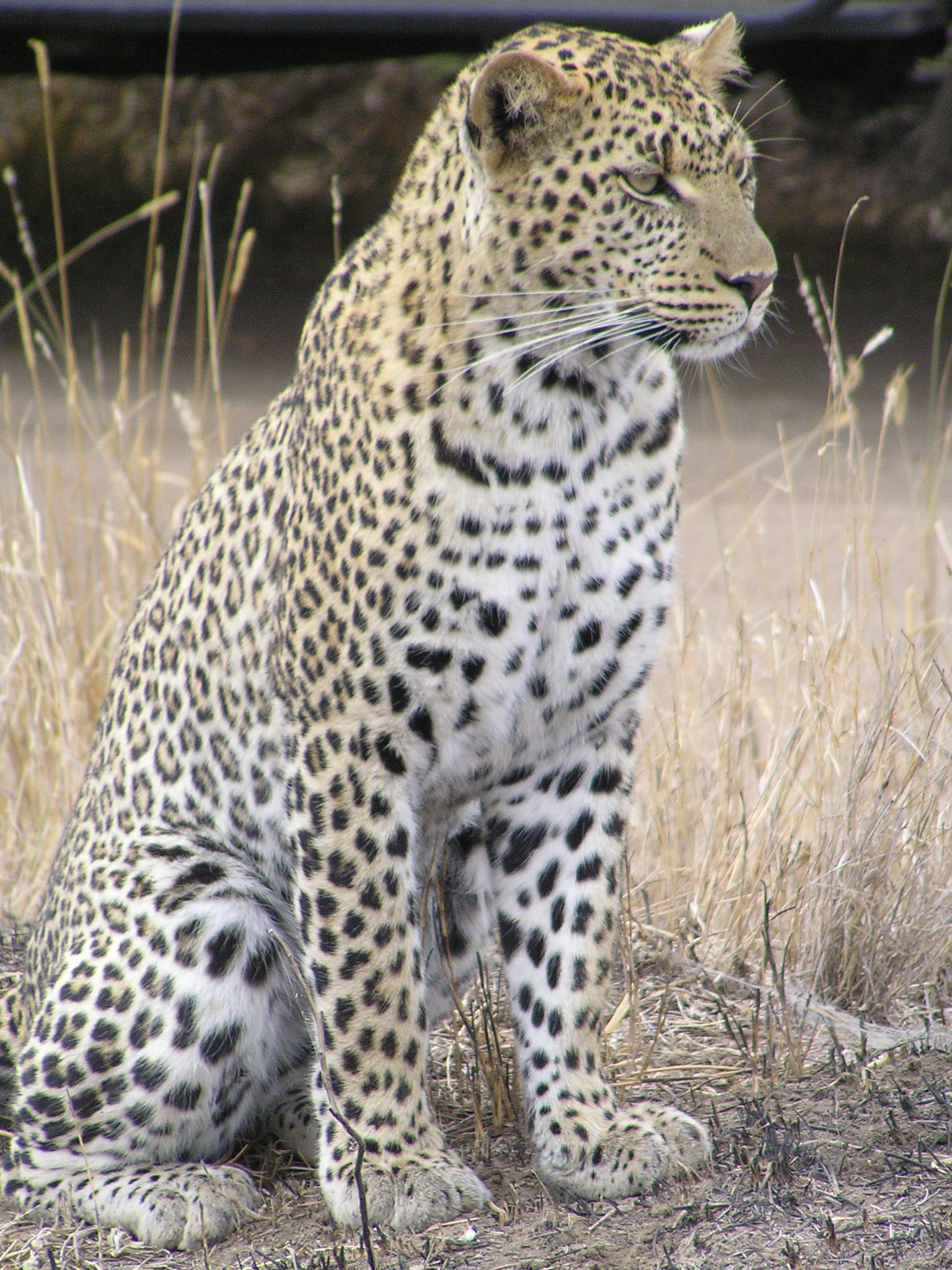
The leopard is a host of Cucullanorhynchus constrictruncatus

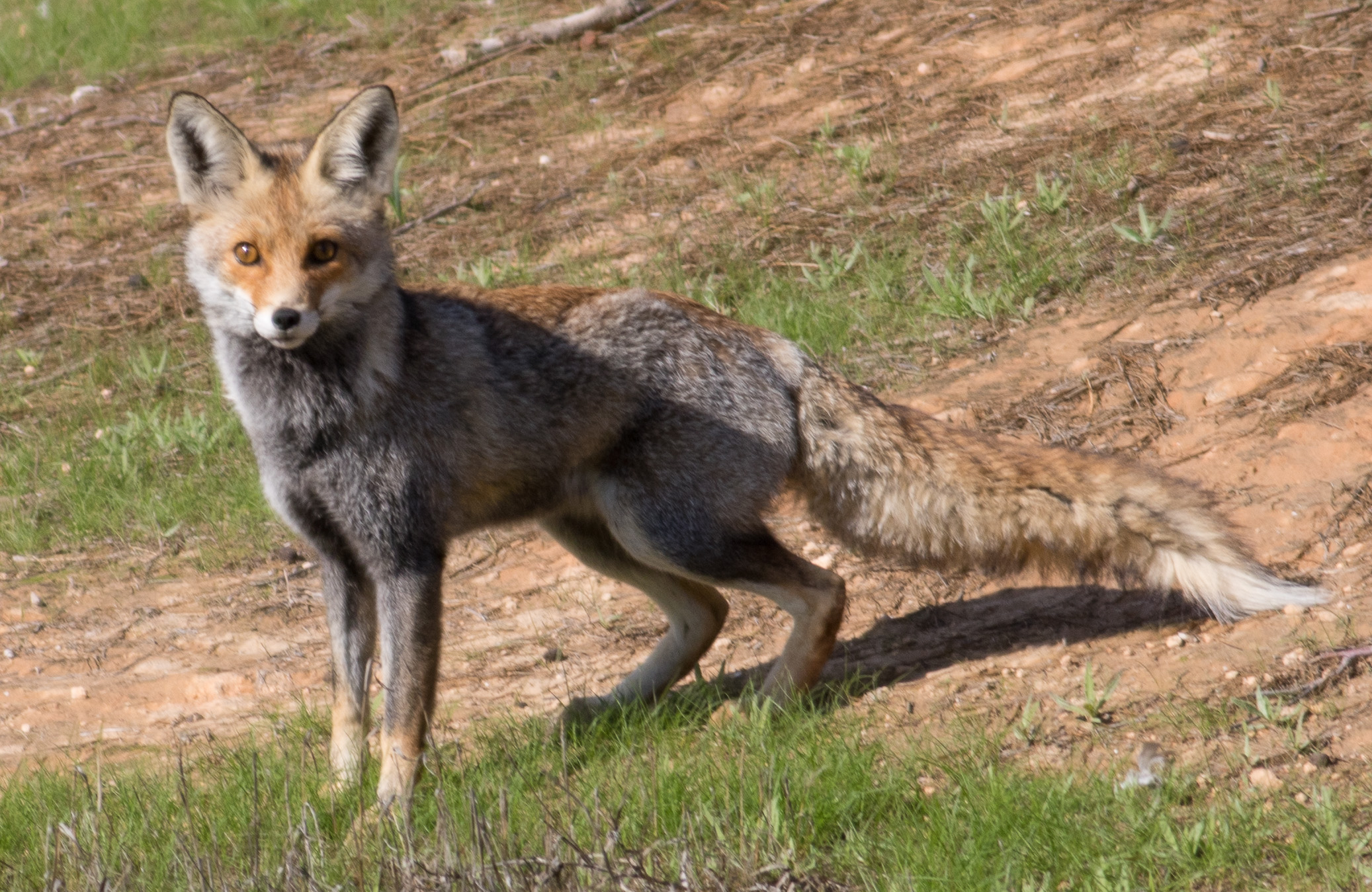
Oncicola schacheri was found parasitizing the Palestinian subspecies of the red fox

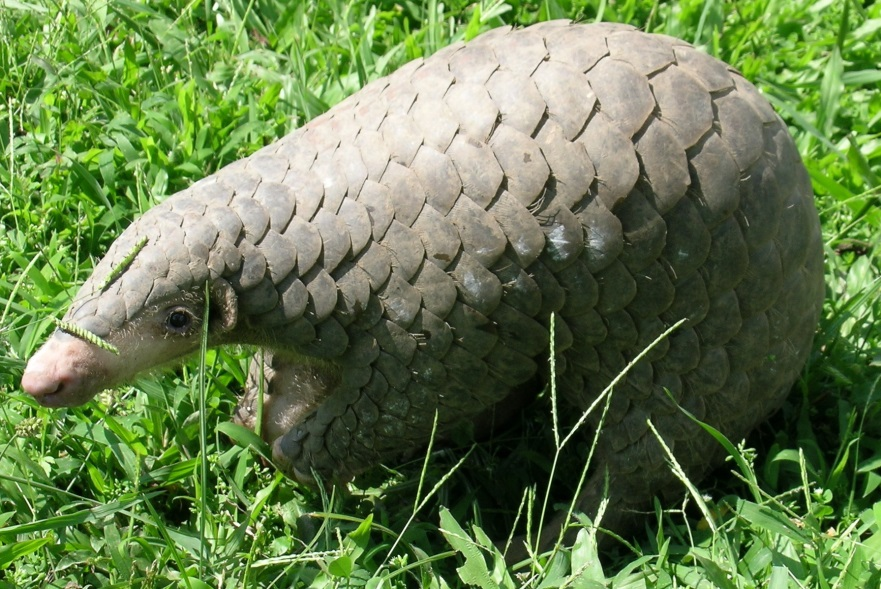
The Chinese pangolin is a host of Paraprosthenorchis ornatus
