= Lemniscus (anatomy) =

Band of secondary nerve fibers

Identifiers
- NeuroLex ID: birnlex_881
- TA98: A14.1.00.014

A lemniscus (Greek for ribbon or band) is a bundle of secondary sensory fibers in the brainstem. The medial lemniscus and lateral lemniscus terminate in specific relay nuclei of the diencephalon. The trigeminal lemniscus is sometimes considered as the cephalic part of the medial lemniscus. The spinal lemniscus constitutes the spinothalamic tract.
