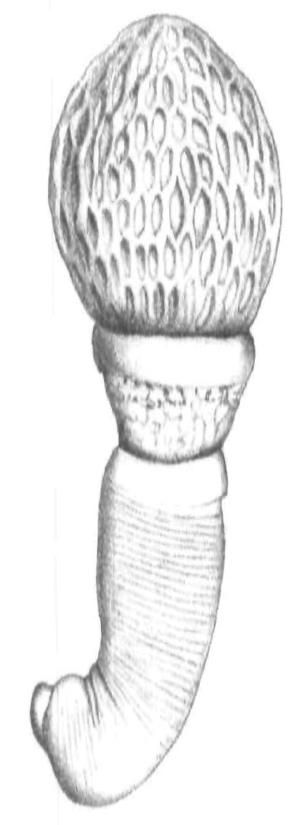
- Apororhynchus hemignathi

Scientific classification
- Kingdom: Animalia
- Phylum: Acanthocephala
- Class: Archiacanthocephala; Meyer, 1931

Orders
- Apororhynchida; Gigantorhynchida; Moniliformida; Oligacanthorhynchida

= Archiacanthocephala =

Class of thorny-headed worms

Archiacanthocephala is a class within the phylum of Acanthocephala. They are parasitic worms, which attach themselves to the intestinal wall of terrestrial vertebrates, including humans. They are characterised by the body wall and the lemnisci (which are a bundle of sensory nerve fibers), which have nuclei that divide without spindle formation, or the appearance of chromosomes, or it has a few amoebae-like giant nuclei. Typically, there are eight separate cement glands in the male, which is one of the few ways to distinguish the dorsal and ventral sides of these organisms.

== Taxonomy ==
Genetic data are not available for the genus Apororhynchus in public databases, and Apororhynchus has not been included in phylogenetic analyses thus far due to insufficiency of morphological data. However, the lack of features such as an absence of a muscle plate, a midventral longitudinal muscle, lateral receptacle flexors, and an apical sensory organ when compared to the other three orders of class Archiacanthocephala indicate it is an early offshoot (basal).

Archiacanthocephala

- Archiacanthocephala
  - Oligacanthorhynchidae
    - Macracanthorhynchus ingens
    - Oncicola venezuelensis
  - - Moniliformidae
      Moniliformis moniliformis
    - Gigantorhynchida
      - Mediorhynchus sp.
      - Gigantorhynchus echinodiscus

Phylogenetic reconstruction for select species in the class Archiacanthocephala

== Description ==
All species in the class Archiacanthocephala are terrestrial and use terrestrial insects and myriapods as intermediate hosts and predatory birds and mammals as a primary host. They attach themselves to the intestinal wall using a hook covered proboscis. The worms are also characterised by the body wall and the lemnisci (which are a bundle of sensory nerve fibers), which have nuclei that divide without spindle formation or the appearance of chromosomes or it has a few amoebae-like giant nuclei.

== Orders ==
There are four orders in the class Archiacanthocephala:

- Apororhynchida

The order Apororhynchida contains only one family, Apororhynchidae, and one genus Apororhynchus which contains six species. The type species is A. hemignathi (Shipley, 1896). A lack of features commonly found in the phylum Acanthocephala (primarily musculature) suggests an evolutionary branching from the other three orders of class Archiacanthocephala; however no genetic analysis has been completed to determine the evolutionary relationship between species. The distinguishing features of this order among archiacanthocephalans is a highly enlarged proboscis which contain small hooks. The musculature around the proboscis (the proboscis receptacle and receptacle protrusor) is also structured differently in this order. The six species are distributed globally, being collected sporadically in Hawaii, Europe, North America, South America, and Asia. These worms exclusively parasitize birds by attaching themselves around the cloaca using their hook-covered proboscis. The bird hosts are of different orders, including owls, waders, and passerines. Infestation by an Apororhynchus species may cause enteritis and anemia.

- Gigantorhynchida
- Moniliformida
- Oligacanthorhynchida

== See also ==
- List of parasites (human)
