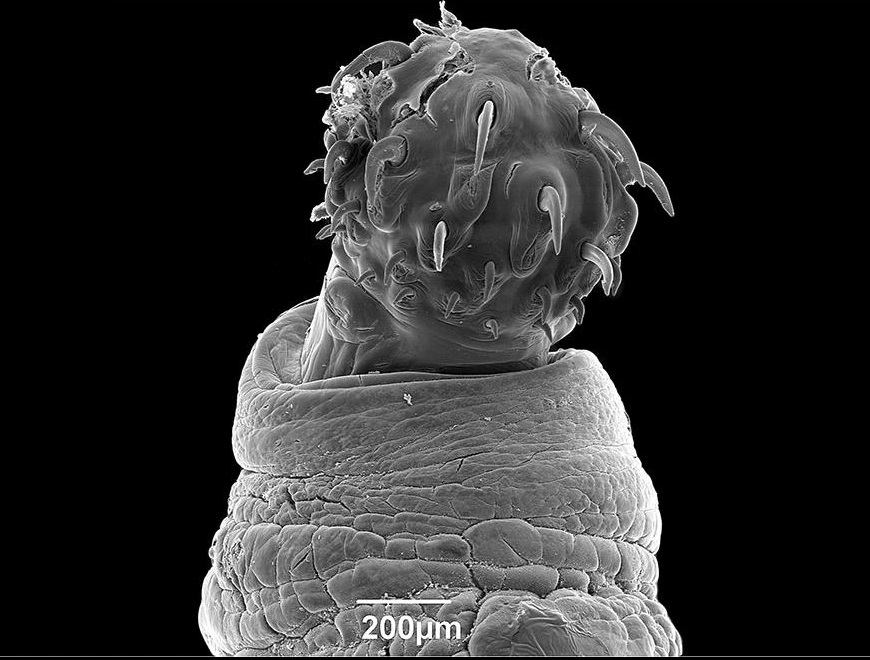
- Proboscis of P. lenti

Scientific classification
- Kingdom: Animalia
- Phylum: Acanthocephala
- Class: Archiacanthocephala
- Order: Oligacanthorhynchida
- Family: Oligacanthorhynchidae
- Genus: Pachysentis; Meyer, 1931

Type species
- Pachysentis canicola Meyer, 1931

Other species
- Pachysentis angolensis; Pachysentis dollfusi; Pachysentis ehrenbergi; Pachysentis gethi; Pachysentis lauroi; Pachysentis lenti; Pachysentis procumbens; Pachysentis procyonis; Pachysentis rugosus; Pachysentis septemserialis?

= Pachysentis =

Genus of worms

Pachysentis is a genus in Acanthocephala (thorny-headed or spiny-headed worms) that parasitize primates and carnivorans. The eleven species are distributed across Africa, the Middle East, and the Americas. Pachysentis species attach themselves to the inner lining of the gastrointestinal tract of their hosts using their hook-covered proboscis. Their life cycle includes an egg stage found in host feces, a cystacanth (larval) stage in an intermediate host which is usually an insect, and an adult stage where cystacanths mature in the intestines of the host. This genus appears identical to the closely related Oncicola apart from a greater number of hooks on the proboscis. There are eleven species assigned to this genus, although P. septemserialis is of uncertain taxonomic status. The female worms range from 12 millimetres (0.47 in) long and 1.6 millimetres (0.063 in) wide in P. lauroi to 50 millimetres (2.0 in) long and 4 millimetres (0.16 in) wide in P. dollfusi. Virtually all of the length is the trunk, with a short proboscis. There is pronounced sexual dimorphism in this species as females are around twice the size of the males. Infestation of P. canicola in the Sao Miguel island fox caused inflammation, degradation, and perforation of the intestines and death of the intestinal tissues, but no infestations in humans have been reported.

== Taxonomy ==
The genus Pachysentis was established with three species by Anton Meyer in 1931, with P. canicola designated as the type species. The genus underwent a significant expansion in 1972 when parasitologist Gerald D. Schmidt reclassified seven species into Pachysentis including six formerly belonging to Prosthenorchis and one from Oncicola. The status of P. septemserialis remains contentious; inconsistencies between the original 1950 description and the surviving paratype led Gomes et al. in 2019 to suggest it may be a synonym of P. lenti.

Phylogenetic analysis has been conducted on one of the eleven species in the genus, P. canicola. Sequences of the molecular marker 18S rDNA gene were compared to the same sequences in related species and it was concluded that P. canicola samples formed a well-supported group with other species in the family Oligacanthorhynchidae. Phylogenetic analyses have also been conducted on Oncicola, a genus morphologically nearly identical to Pachysentis apart from the number of hooks on the proboscis, and have also placed it in the family Oligacanthorhynchidae.

Archiacanthocephala

- Archiacanthocephala
  - Oligacanthorhynchidae
    - Macracanthorhynchus ingens
    - Oncicola venezuelensis
    - Oligacanthorhynchus tortuosa
    - Nephridiacanthus major
    - Pachysentis canicola
  - - Moniliformidae
      Moniliformis moniliformis
    - Gigantorhynchida
      - Mediorhynchus sp.
      - Gigantorhynchus echinodiscus

Phylogenetic reconstruction for select species in the class Archiacanthocephala based on a 28S rRNA gene comparison from Gomes et al. (2019) and a 18S rDNA gene comparison from Amin and colleagues (2020). Amin and colleagues (2022) used the 18S rDNA gene to add P. canicola phylogenetically to the family Oligacanthorhynchidae.

== Description ==
Number of proboscis hooks		Barbs in hooks
P. angolensis	42	No barbs
P. canicola	72	No barbs
P. dollfusi	48	Barbs
P. ehrenbergi	102	Barbs (Note: Barbs were not mentioned in the original description of the species by Meyer (1931), but were found in the 2019 reexamination of the original samples in 2019 by Gomes.)
P. gethi	42	No barbs
P. lauroi	48	Barbs
P. lenti	48	No barbs
P. procumbens	90	No barbs
P. procyonis	42	No barbs
P. rugosus	42	No barbs

Pachysentis looks identical to the closely related Oncicola apart from the number of hooks on the proboscis. Species of Oncicola have 36 or fewer hooks whereas species of Pachysentis have more. The probosces of Pachysentis species are not quite spherical and contain 42 to 102 hooks arranged into 12 longitudinal rows of 3 to 12 hooks each. Depending on the species, the rows may be regularly or irregularly alternating and straight or crooked. Hooks have tips with or without barbs, and the larger hooks with complex heads (manubria) and roots with the remaining spines being rootless. The trunk is around twice as long as wide with the anterior half usually wider than the posterior half. The testes are in tandem with at least one located before the middle of the worm. There are eight cement glands compactly arranged each with a single giant nucleus used to temporarily close the posterior end of the female after copulation. The eggs have a sculptured outer membrane. Species can be distinguished based on the number and arrangements of proboscis hooks, whether these hooks are barbed, the arrangement of the cement glands, host, and the length of lemnisci (bundles of sensory nerve fibers).

Female measurements (mm)
Measurements (Note: One value for the length and width of the proboscis, size of proboscis receptacle, and length of lemnisci is reported for both sexes in all species.)	P. angolensis	P. canicola	P. dollfusi	P. ehrenbergi	P. gethi	P. lauroi	P. lenti	P. procumbens (Note: Measurements are from a juvenile P. procumbens and one value for all measurements is given for both sexes.)	P. procyonis	P. rugosus
Length of proboscis	0.55-0.63	0.57-0.80	?	0.8	0.583	0.68	0.63	0.55	0.697	0.564
Width of proboscis	0.70–0.82	0.57–0.85	?	0.9	0.794	0.76	0.664	0.55	0.716	0.694
Length of proboscis receptacle	1.5	2	?	1.3	1.07	1.16	1.32	1.2	1.37	1.24
Width of proboscis receptacle	?	?	?	?	0.498	0.47	?	?	0.531	0.481
Length of trunk	34–48	20–26	50	26–29	15–25	12.07	20–25	6	25-35	32
Width of trunk	4.8–5.5	5-11	4	6	1.5–3	1.62	2–2.5	1.25	2–3	3
Length of lemnisci	5.8–6	7	4.3–6.6	7	3.48	4.45	3.15	?	3.64	4.64
Width of lemnisci	?	?	?	0.8	?	?	?	?	?	?
Uterine bell (Note: a funnel like opening continuous with the uterus.)	?	3.15–8.15	?	?	5.56	1.19	1.41	?	4.64	5.86
Size of eggs	0.09 × 0.043	0.07 × 0.045	0.08 × 0.05	0.07 × 0.05	0.084 × 0.054	0.073 × 0.045	?	?	0.071 × 0.042	?
Male measurements (mm)
Length of proboscis	0.55-0.63	0.57-0.80	?	0.8	0.583	0.68	0.63	0.55	0.697	0.564
Width of proboscis	0.70–0.82	0.57–0.85	?	0.9	0.794	0.76	0.664	0.55	0.716	0.694
Length of proboscis receptacle	1.5	2	?	1.3	1.07	1.16	1.32	1.2	1.37	1.24
Width of proboscis receptacle	?	?	?	?	0.498	0.47	?	?	0.531	0.481
Length of trunk	17-23	15-28	50	25	10–15 × 1.0–2.5	9.63	15–20	6	20-30	25
Width of trunk	3.5–4	4-8	4	4	1.0–2.5	1.91	1.0–2.5	1.25	2–3	3.5
Length of lemnisci	5.8–6	7	4.3–6.6	7	3.48	4.45	3.15	?	3.64	4.64
Width of lemnisci	?	?	?	0.8	?	?	?	?	?	?
Size of anterior testis	2–3 × 0.9	2	?	3	1.40 × 0.581	1.15 × 0.48	1.76 × 0.51	?	3.01 × 1.24	1.57 × 0.697
Size of posterior testis	2–4.3 × 1.0	2	?	3	1.40 × 0.581	1.27 × 0.55	1.82 × 0.547	?	3.15 × 1.07	1.69 × 0.664
Dimension of group of cement glands	3	3	?	7	1.54	0.86 × 0.56	2.98	?	3.56	2.02
Ejaculatory duct length	2.3	?	?	?	4.64	1.42	?	?	3.53	1.68

== Species ==
The genus Pachysentis contains eleven species, although P. septemserialis is of uncertain taxonomic status. (Note: A binomial authority in parentheses indicates that the species was originally described in a genus other than the present genus.)

- Pachysentis angolensis (Golvan, 1957) (Note: P. angolensis was originally named Oncicola angolensis by Golvan in 1957 but was renamed by Schmidt in 1972.)

P. angolensis was found infesting the side-striped jackal (Canis adustus). The proboscis has a total of 42 hooks without barbs in 12 regularly alternating rows of three and four hooks (six rows of each). The eight cement glands are organized in pairs. This species is named after Angola, the country where it was first discovered.

- Pachysentis canicola Meyer, 1931

P. canicola was found infesting the red fox (Vulpes vulpes) in Bushehr, Bushehr Province, Iran, the golden jackal (Canis aureus) also in Iran, captive maned wolves (Chrysocyon brachyurus) in a zoo in Texas, and the striped skunk (Mephitis mephitis) found nearby. An invasive P. canicola is also responsible for the decline in the indigenous Sao Miguel island fox (Urocyon littoralis) population of Sao Miguel Island detected in 69% of 40 the necropsied foxes. It was also found infesting the western diamondback rattlesnake (Crotalus atrox), a Paratenic hosts (hosts where parasites infest but do not undergo larval development or sexual reproduction). It is the type species of the genus Pachysentis. The species name canicola is derived from the Latin word for canine which is the type of creature (family Canidae) that this species infests.

- Pachysentis dollfusi (Machado-Filho, 1950) (Note: P. dollfusi was originally named Prosthenorchis dollfusi by Machado-Filho in 1950 but was renamed by Schmidt in 1972.)

P. dollfusi was found infesting the intestines of the common brown lemur (Eulemur fulvus) in a Brazilian zoo but originally from the island of Madagascar. It is thus unknown if the worm originates from Brazil or Madagascar. The proboscis has 48 barbed hooks arranged into six rows of four hooks each followed by another six rows of four hooks each. The cement glands are in uniform pairs. It is synonymous with Prosthenorchis spirula Travassos 1917. It is named after the parasitologist Robert-Philippe Dollfus.

- Pachysentis ehrenbergi Meyer, 1931

P. ehrenbergi was found infesting the red fox (Vulpes vulpes) in Egypt and in an paratenic hosts (hosts where parasites infest but do not undergo larval development or sexual reproduction), the Egyptian cobra (Naja haje). The proboscis is armed with 102 barbed hooks arranged into six rows of nine each followed by six rows of eight hooks each. P. ehrenbergi was reported infesting the body cavity of 5.4% of a sample of African five-lined skinks (Trachylepis quinquetaeniata) in the Qena Governorate of Egypt, however the measurements and morphological description do not match either the original description by Meyer in 1931 or the reexamination of original specimens by Gomes and colleagues in 2019. Juvenile P. ehrenbergi have been reported infesting the long-eared hedgehog (Hemiechinus auritus) in the Faran Oasis, South Sinai, Egypt. Juvenile trunk length is reported to be 3.22–4.16 mm by 0.87–1.04 mm, the proboscis length to be 0.42–0.60 mm in length by 0.45–0.68 mm in width, the proboscis sheath to be 0.79–1.0 mm by 0.37–0.52 mm (whereas the measurements given by Meyer in the original 1931 description is larger, at 1.3 mm in length and the proboscis measuring 0.8 mm in length by 0.9 mm in width). The anterior proboscis hooks in the juveniles are reported to be large, from 0.078–0.086 mm long, and the posterior hooks smaller, from 0.052–0.062 mm. This species is named after Christian Gottfried Ehrenberg who was a pioneer in the study of microorganisms in the 19th century, and had a role in collecting the original type specimens.

- Pachysentis gethi (Machado-Filho, 1950) (Note: P. gethi was originally named Prosthenorchis gethi by Machado-Filho in 1950 but was renamed by Schmidt in 1972.)

P. gethi was originally described in 1950 by Machado-Filho infesting tayra (Eira barbara) in Pará and Rio de Janeiro, Brazil but this remained the only record until it was rediscovered in 2016 infesting the wild lesser grison (Galictis cuja), also in Rio de Janeiro, with smaller measurements. The proboscis has 42 hooks without barbs arranged into six rows of four hooks followed by six rows of three hooks. The eight cement glands occur in pairs. The species is named after Dr. Geth Jansen.

- Pachysentis lauroi Gomes, Amin, Olifiers, Bianchi, Souza, Barbosa & Maldonado, 2019

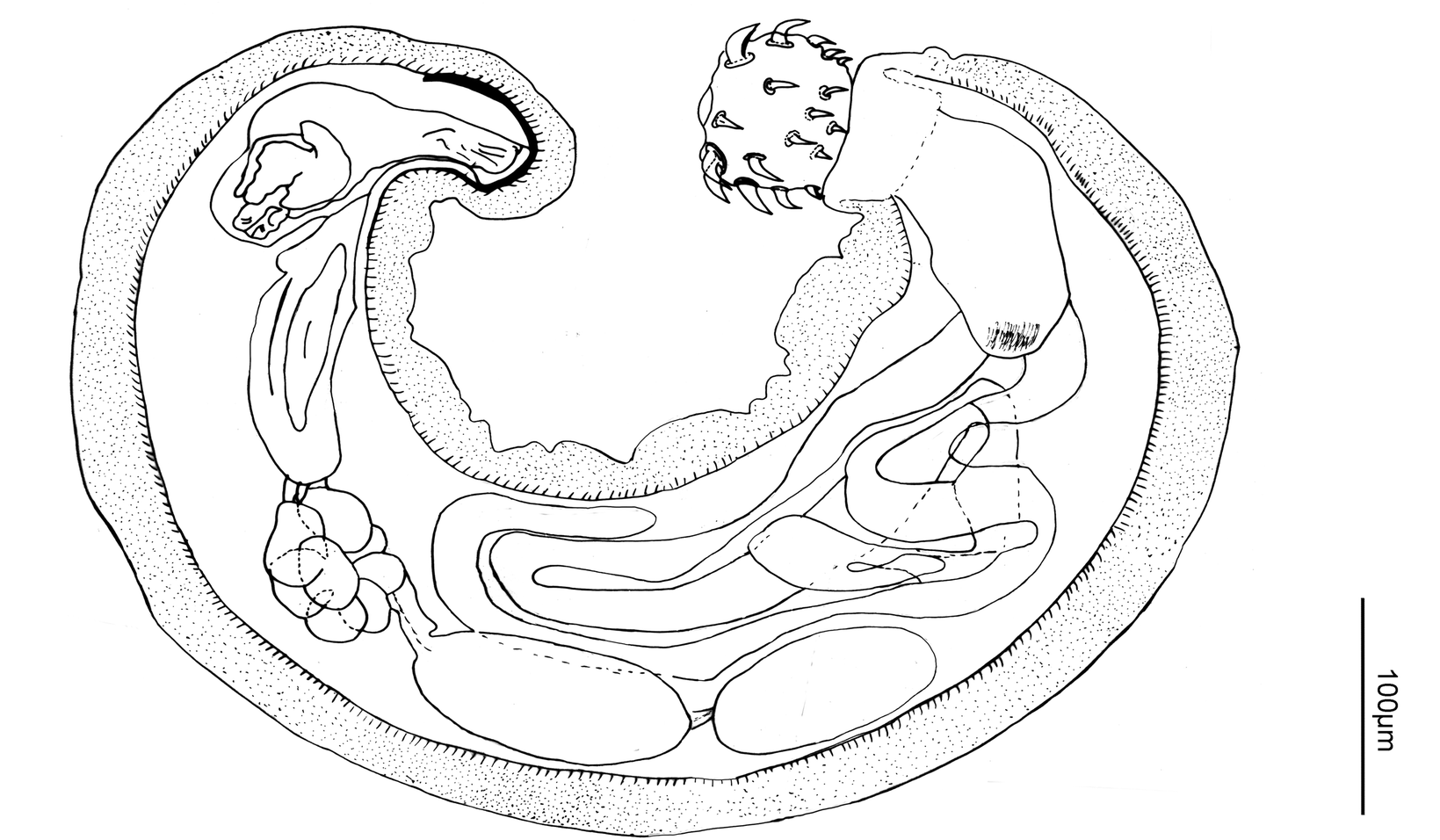
Diagram of a male P. lauroi showing the anterior and posterior testes, and eight cements glands in a clustered arrangement

P. lauroi has been found infesting the South American coati (Nasua nasua) in Mato Grosso do Sul, Brazil. The proboscis has 48 barbed hooks arranged into six rows of four hooks followed by six rows of four hooks. The eight cement glands are clustered. It was found in the small intestine. The species is named after Lauro Travassos, a parasitologist who studied Brazilian Acanthocephala.

- Pachysentis lenti (Machado-Filho, 1950) (Note: P. lenti was originally named Prosthenorchis lenti by Machado-Filho in 1950 but was renamed by Schmidt in 1972.)

P. lenti has been found infesting the white-headed marmoset (Callithrix geoffroyi) in Espírito Santo, Brazil. The proboscis has 48 hooks without barbs arranged into six rows of four hooks followed by six rows of four hooks. It is named after Herman Lent, a Brazilian parasitologist.

- Pachysentis procumbens Meyer, 1931

P. procumbens has been found infesting the red fox (Vulpes vulpes) in Argo, Egypt. The proboscis has 90 hooks without barbs arranged into six rows of seven hooks followed by six rows of eight hooks. The species name is from the Latin procumbent, meaning "lying prostrate".

- Pachysentis procyonis (Machado-Filho, 1950) (Note: P. procyonis was originally named Prosthenorchis procyonis by Machado-Filho in 1950 but was renamed by Schmidt in 1972.)

P. procyonis was found infesting the intestines of a crab-eating raccoon (Procyon cancrivorus) in Rio de Janeiro, Brazil. The proboscis has 42 hooks without barbs arranged into six rows of four hooks followed by six rows of three hooks. Distinguishing features include eight clustered cement glands and very short lemnisci that do not reach the anterior testis. The species is named after the genus of the host (Procyon) it was found infesting.

- Pachysentis rugosus (Machado-Filho, 1950) (Note: P. rugosus was originally named Prosthenorchis rugosus by Machado-Filho in 1950 but was renamed by Schmidt in 1972.)

P. rugosus has been found to infest the large intestine of Azaras's capuchin (Sapajus cay) in from a dissection conducted in Rio de Janeiro, Brazil, and the tufted capuchin (Sapajus apella), also from Brazil. The proboscis is armed with 42 hooks without barbs arranged into six rows of four hooks each followed by six rows of three hooks each. This species can be identified by its clustered cement glands and long leminisci that reach the anterior testis. The species name rugosus is Latin for 'wrinkled'.

- Pachysentis septemserialis (Machado-Filho, 1950) (Note: P. septemserialis was originally named Prosthenorchis septemserialis by Machado-Filho in 1950 but was renamed by Schmidt in 1972.)

The validity of P. septemserialis is questioned by Gomes et al. in 2019 due to differences between the paratype's morphological characteristics and the original description, the similarity in hosts to P. lenti (primates of the family Callitrichidae including the black tamarin (Saguinus niger)), and the absence of samples or measurements of adult males. Morphologically, new observations by Gomes et al. in 2019 suggest it is synonymous with P. lenti. Specifically, the original description of one paratype described the lack of a collar at the base of the proboscis whereas a collar was observed in the paratype by Gomes et al. in 2019 (suggesting affiliation with the genus Prosthenorchis). A second discrepancy from another paratype is the number of hooks; 12 longitudinal rows of four hooks with total of 48 hooks were observed by Gomes et al. in 2019 but contradicts the seven rows of seven hooks with a total of 49 hooks given in the original description by Machado-Filho in 1950. The name septemserialis refers to the seven rows one after the other (in series).

== Distribution ==
Worldwide distribution of Pachysentis samples collected in the field. It is thus unknown if P. dollfusi originates from Brazil or Madagascar as it was discovered in a Brazilian zoo in a lemur from Madagascar, or if P. canicola originates from Texas or South America as it was discovered in a maned wolf in a zoo as well as nearby wild striped skunk.

The nearly cosmopolitan distribution of Pachysentis species is determined by that of its many hosts. Pachysentis species have been found in South America (Brazil), Africa (Egypt and Angola), and Asia (Egypt and Iran).

== Hosts and pathology ==
Life cycle of Acanthocephala (Note: There are no known aberrant human infections for Pachysentis species.)

The life cycle an acanthocephalan in general unfolds in three distinct stages. It begins when an egg develops into an infective form known as an acanthor. This acanthor is released with the feces of its definitive host, typically a vertebrate, and must be ingested by an intermediate host, an arthropod such as an insect, to continue its development. The intermediate hosts of Pachysentis species are not known, though one research group speculates that the intermediate hosts of P. canicola are beetles or cockroaches. Inside the intermediate host, the acanthor molts its outer layer, becoming an acanthella (the immature larval stage). At this stage it burrows into the host's intestinal wall and continues to grow. The life cycle culminates in the formation of a cystacanth, a larval stage able to infect the definitive host while retaining juvenile features (differing from the adult only in size and stage of sexual development) and awaits ingestion by the definitive host to mature fully. Once inside the definitive host, these larvae attach themselves to the intestinal wall using the hooks on their proboscis, mature into sexually reproductive adults, and complete the cycle by releasing new acanthors into the host's feces.

Pachysentis species parasitize primates and carnivorans as their definitive host. Paratenic hosts (hosts where parasites infest but do not undergo larval development or sexual reproduction) for Pachysentis have been found for P. ehrenbergi (Egyptian cobra, Naja haje) and P. canicola (western diamondback rattlesnake, Crotalus atrox). A survey of necropsied, Island foxes of Sao Miguel Island infested with P. canicola found health impacts including erosive and ulcerative enteritis, transmural necrosis, and inflammation in nearly half the infested foxes. A survey of the medical literature published in 2021 did not list any Pachysentis species as infecting humans.

Hosts for Pachysentis species

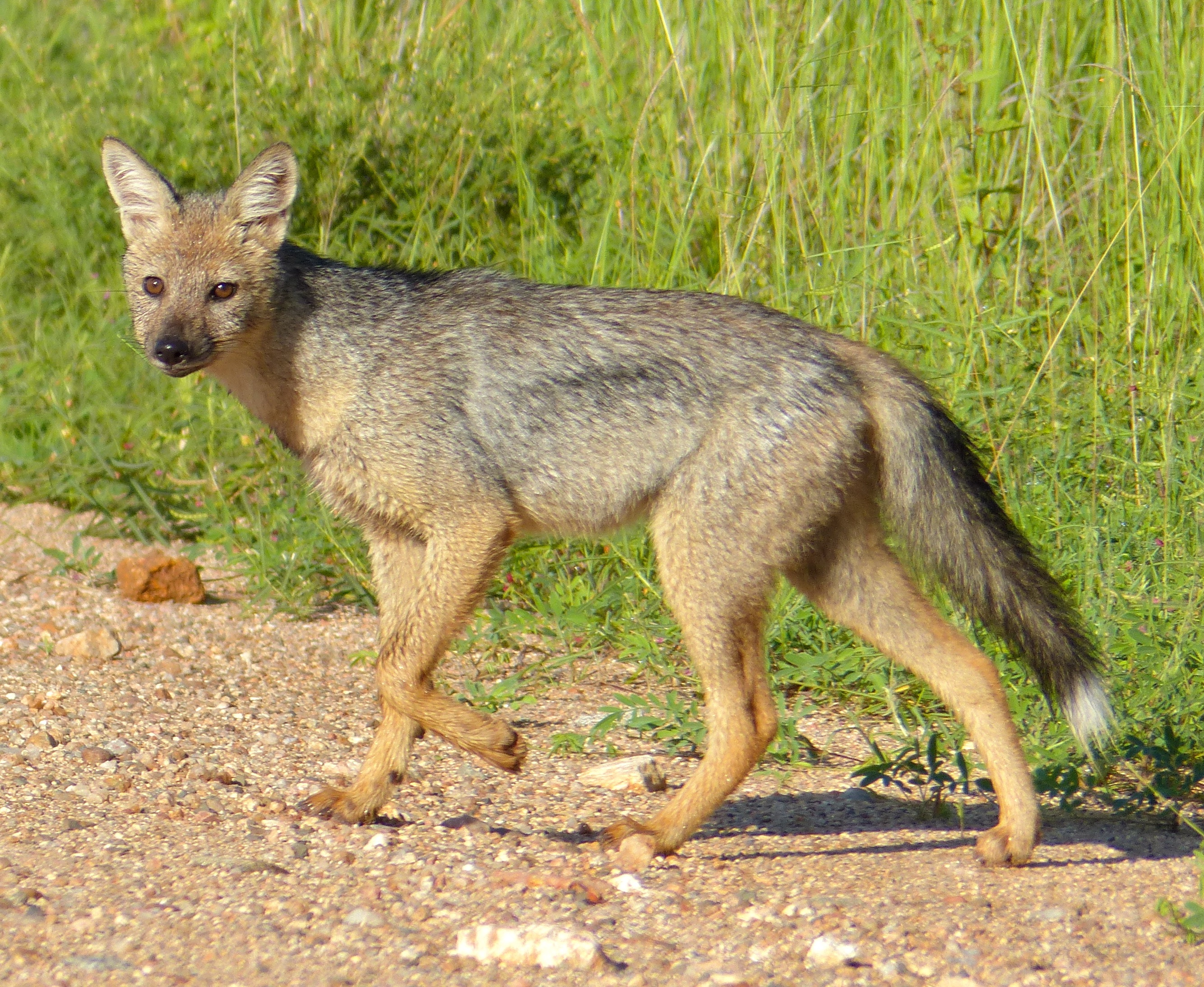
The side-striped jackal is one of the hosts of P. angolensis.

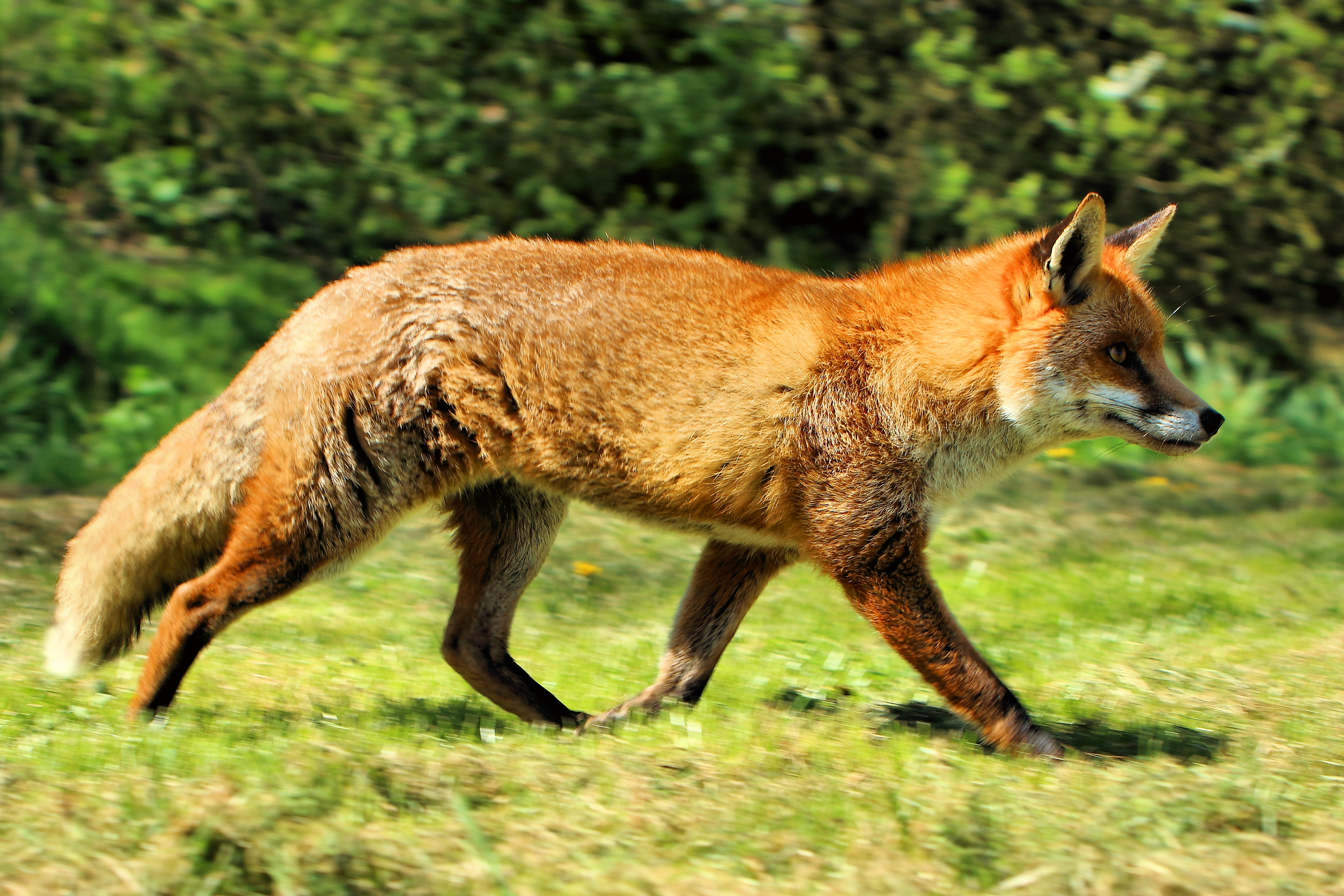
The red fox is one of the hosts of P. canicola and P. procumbens.

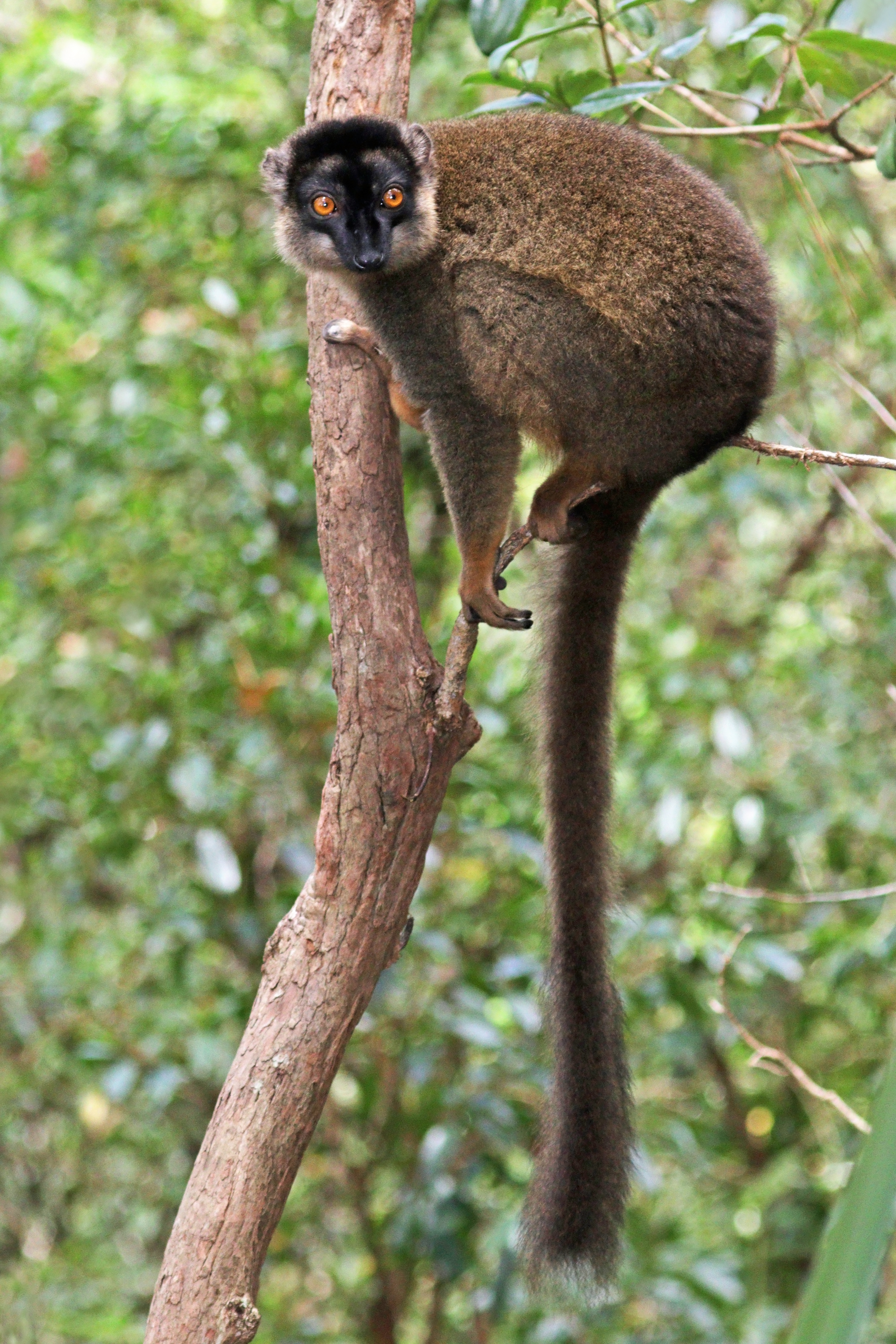
The common brown lemur is one of the hosts of P. dollfusi.

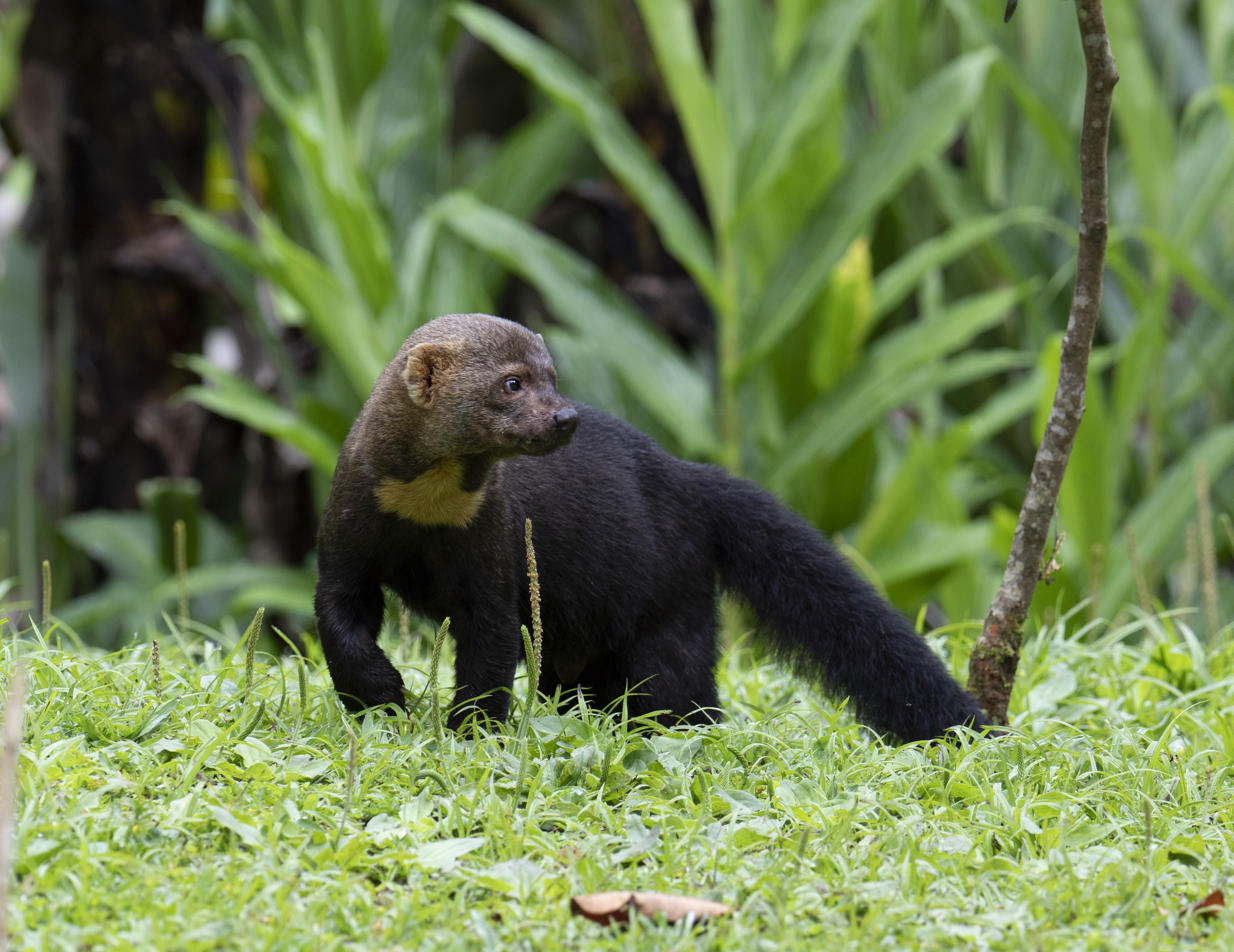
The tayra is one of the hosts of P. gethi.

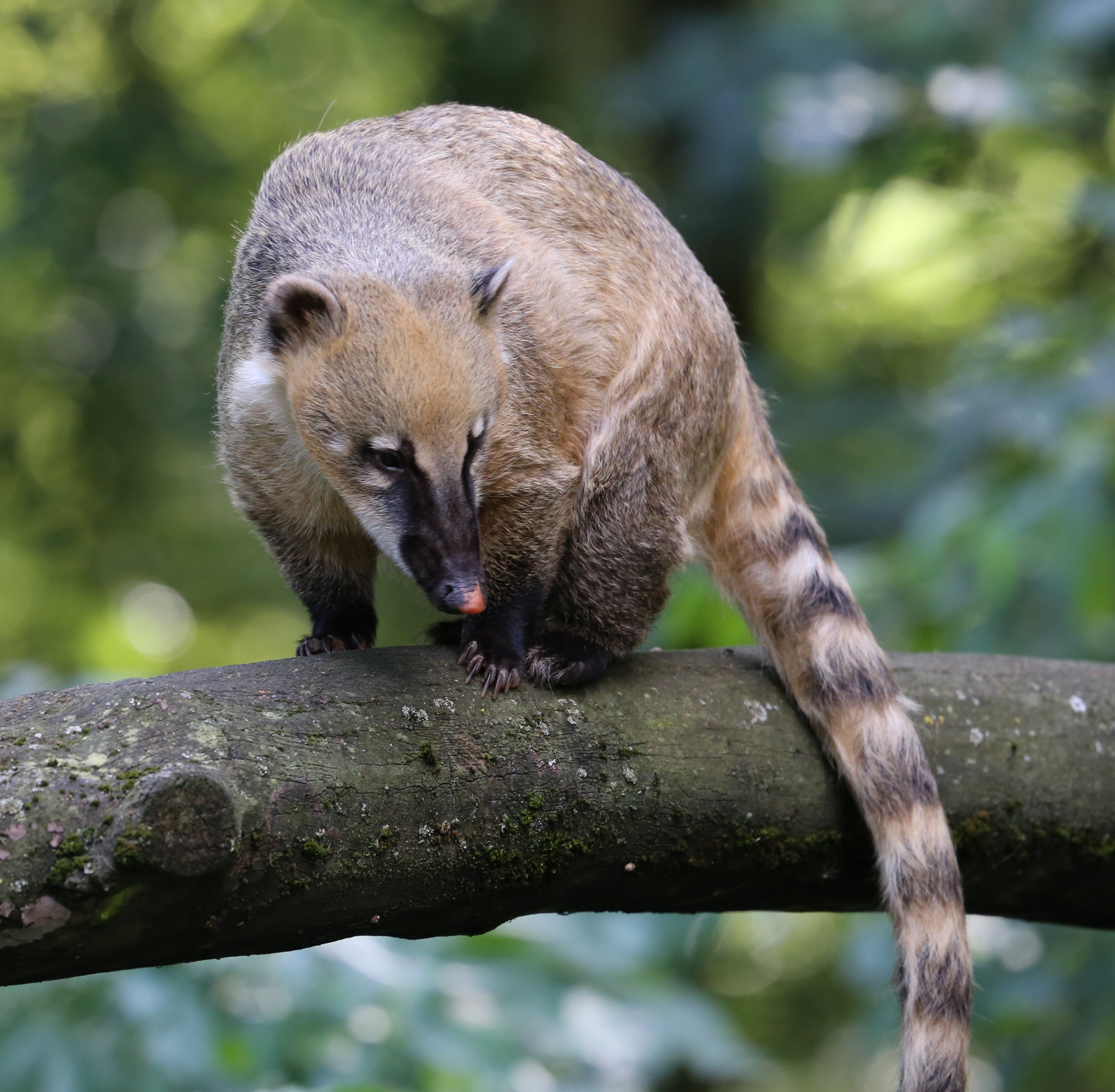
The South American coati is one of the hosts of P. louroi.

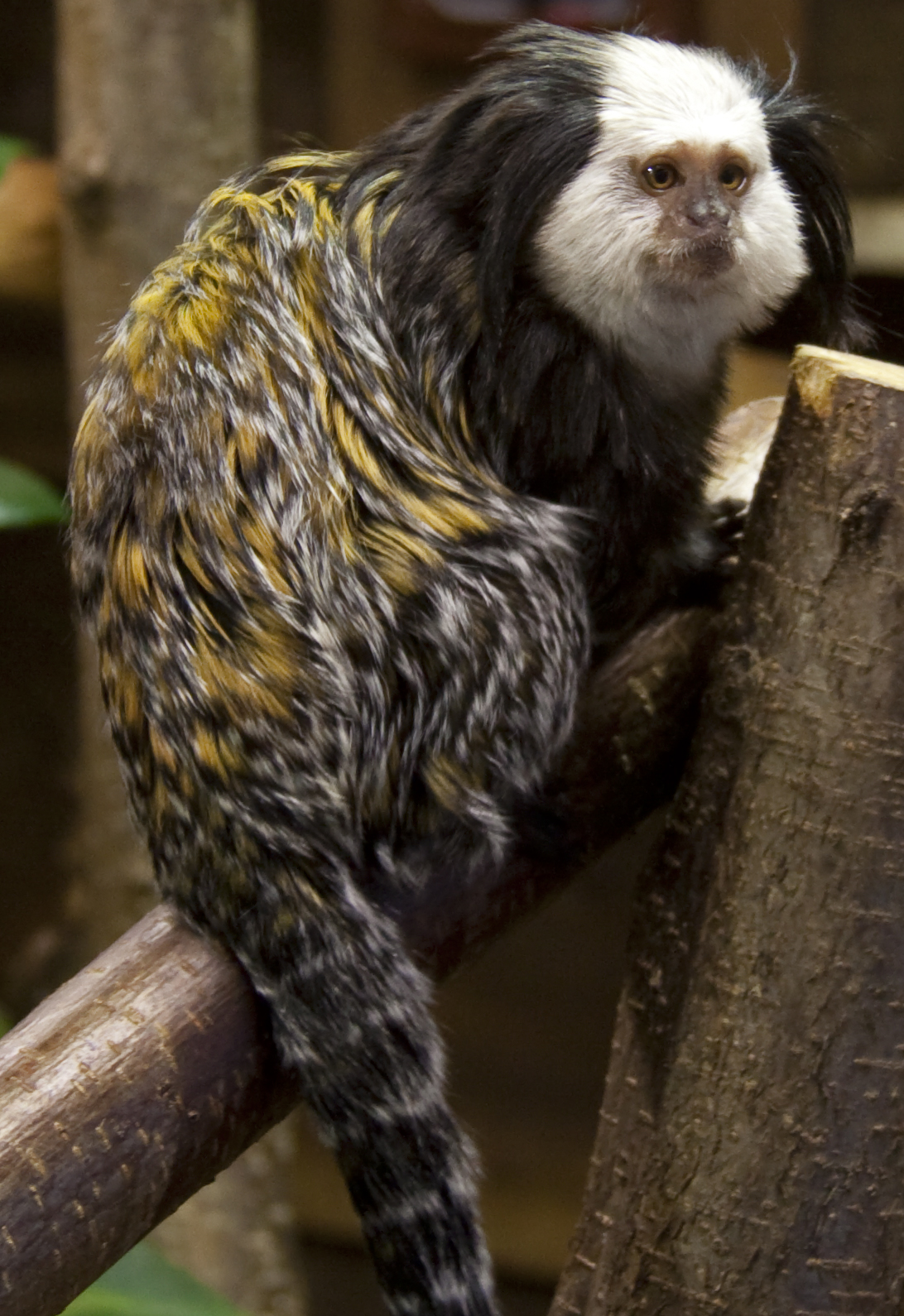
The white-headed marmoset is one of the hosts of P. lenti.

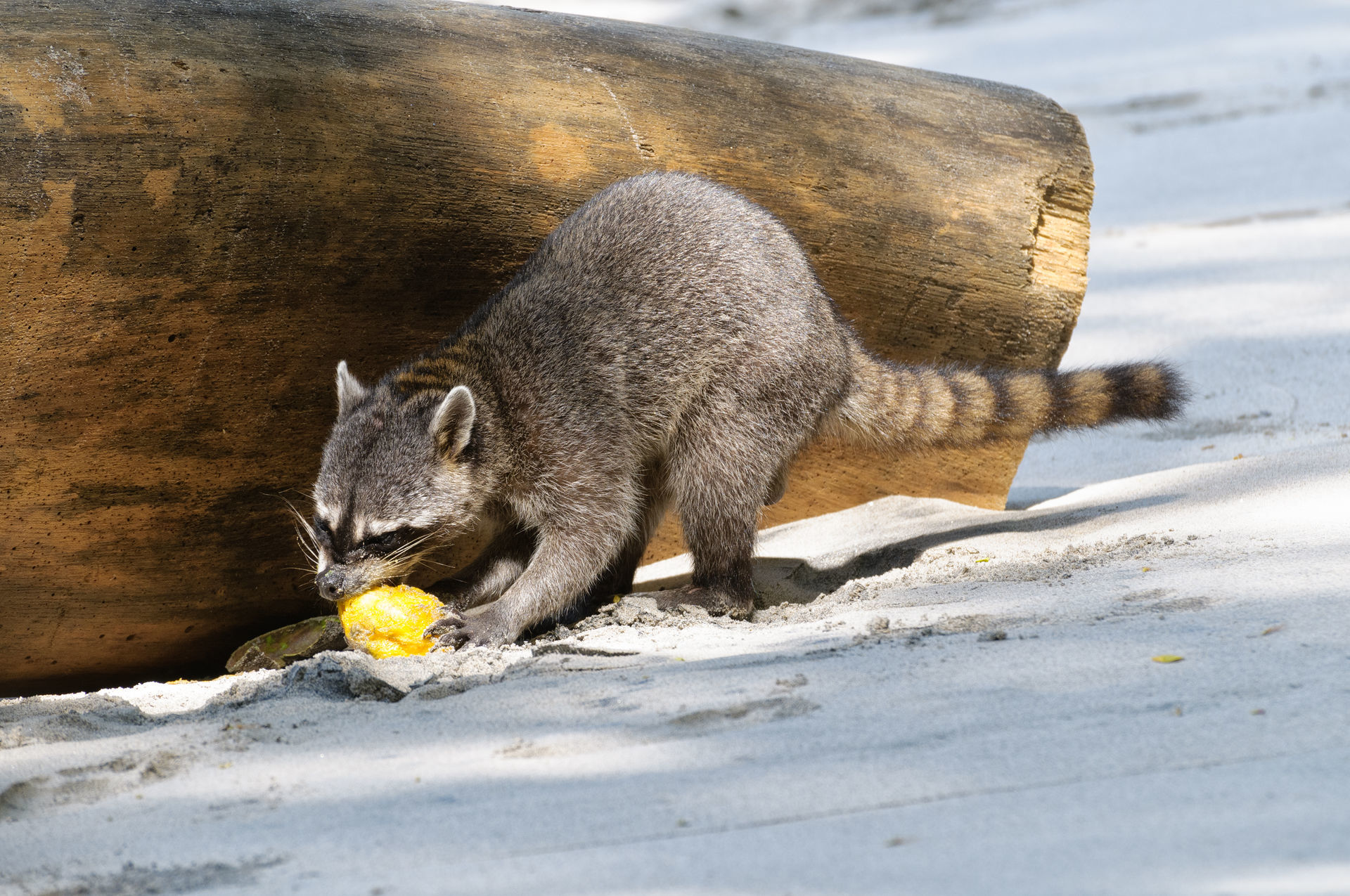
The crab-eating raccoon is one of the hosts of P. procyonis.

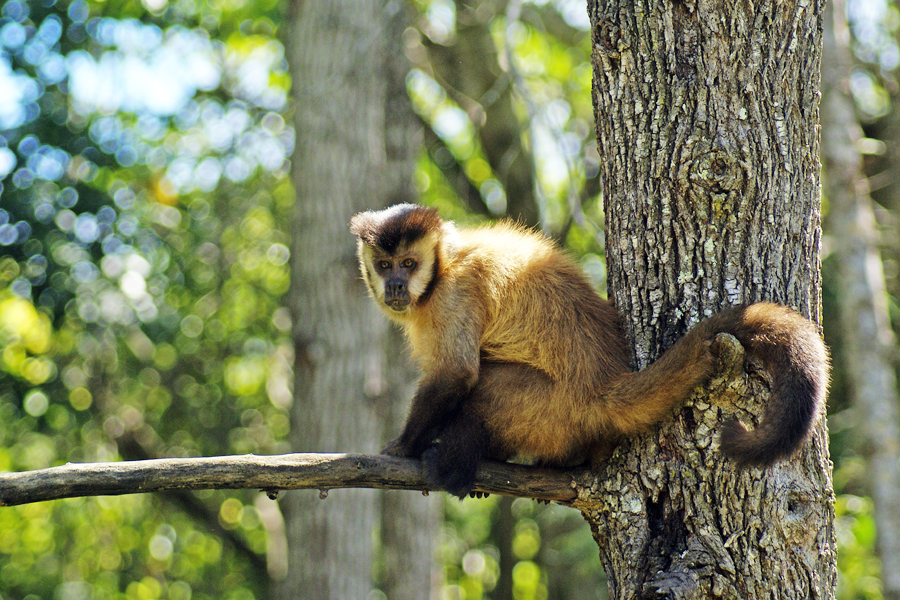
The Azaras's capuchin is one of the hosts of P. rugosus.

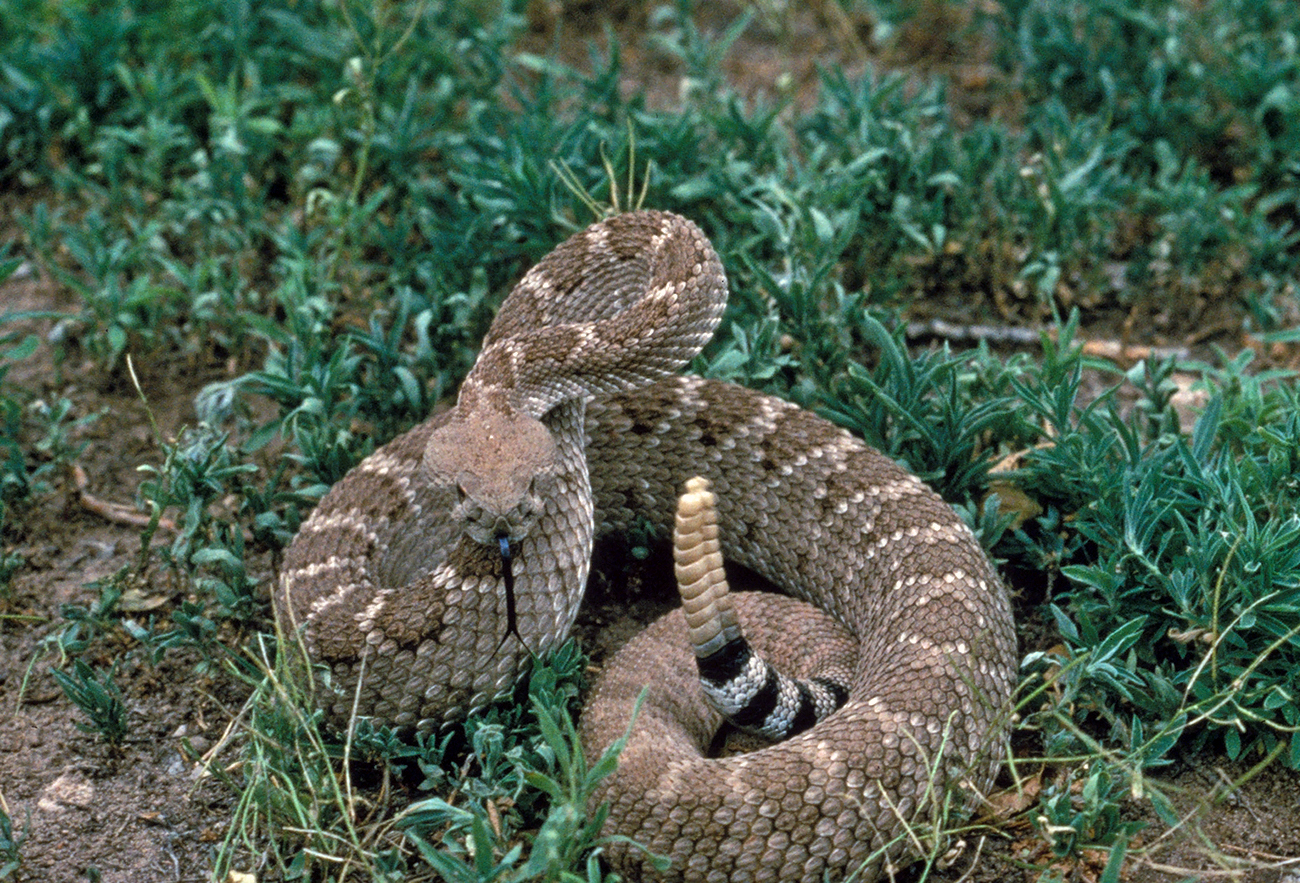
The western diamondback rattlesnake is a paratenic host of P. canicola.

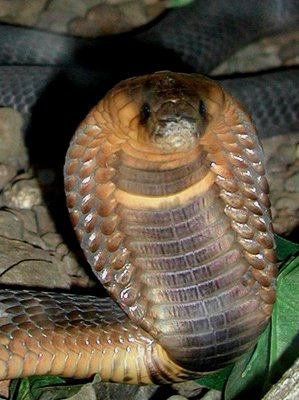
The Egyptian cobra is a paratenic host of P. ehrenbergi.
