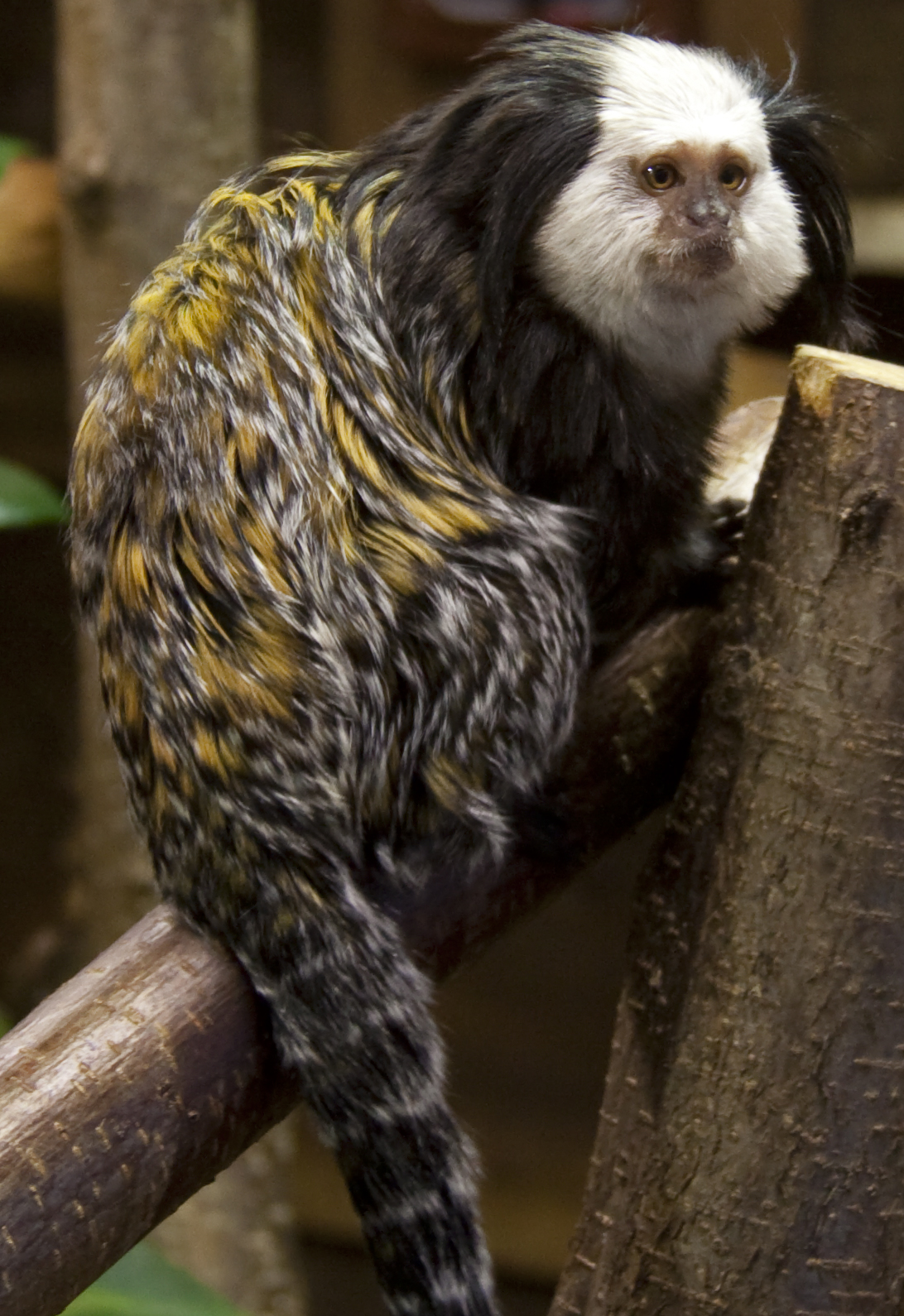

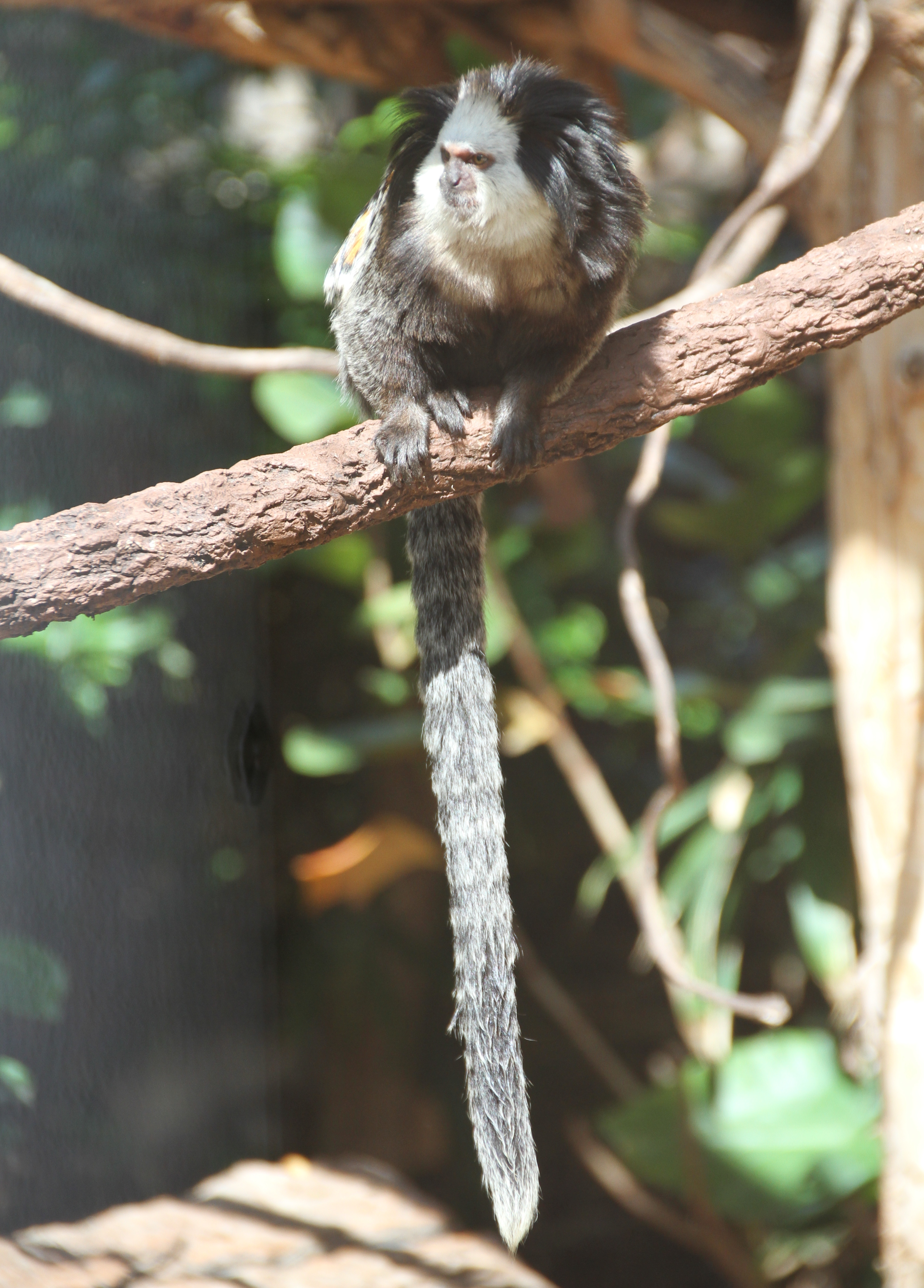

Conservation status
- Least Concern (IUCN 3.1)

Scientific classification
- Kingdom: Animalia
- Phylum: Chordata
- Class: Mammalia
- Infraclass: Placentalia
- Order: Primates
- Family: Callitrichidae
- Genus: Callithrix
- Species: C. geoffroyi

Binomial name
- Callithrix geoffroyi (Humboldt, 1812)
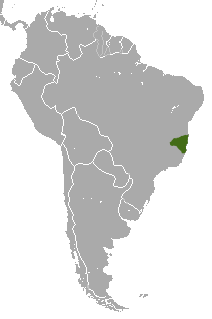
- White-headed marmoset range

Synonyms
- C. albifrons (Thunberg, 1819); C. leucocephalus (Humboldt, 1812); C. leucogenys (Gray, 1870); C. maximiliani (Reichenbach, 1862); C. melanotis (Lesson, 1840)

= White-headed marmoset =

Species of New World monkey

The white-headed marmoset (Callithrix geoffroyi), also known as the tufted-ear marmoset, Geoffroy's marmoset, or Geoffrey's marmoset, is a marmoset endemic to forests in eastern Brazil, where it is native to Bahia, Espírito Santo, and Minas Gerais, and introduced to Santa Catarina. It is known as the sagüi or sauim in Brazil. Its diet consists of fruits, insects, and the gum of trees. It is a host of Pachysentis lenti an acanthocephalan intestinal parasite.
