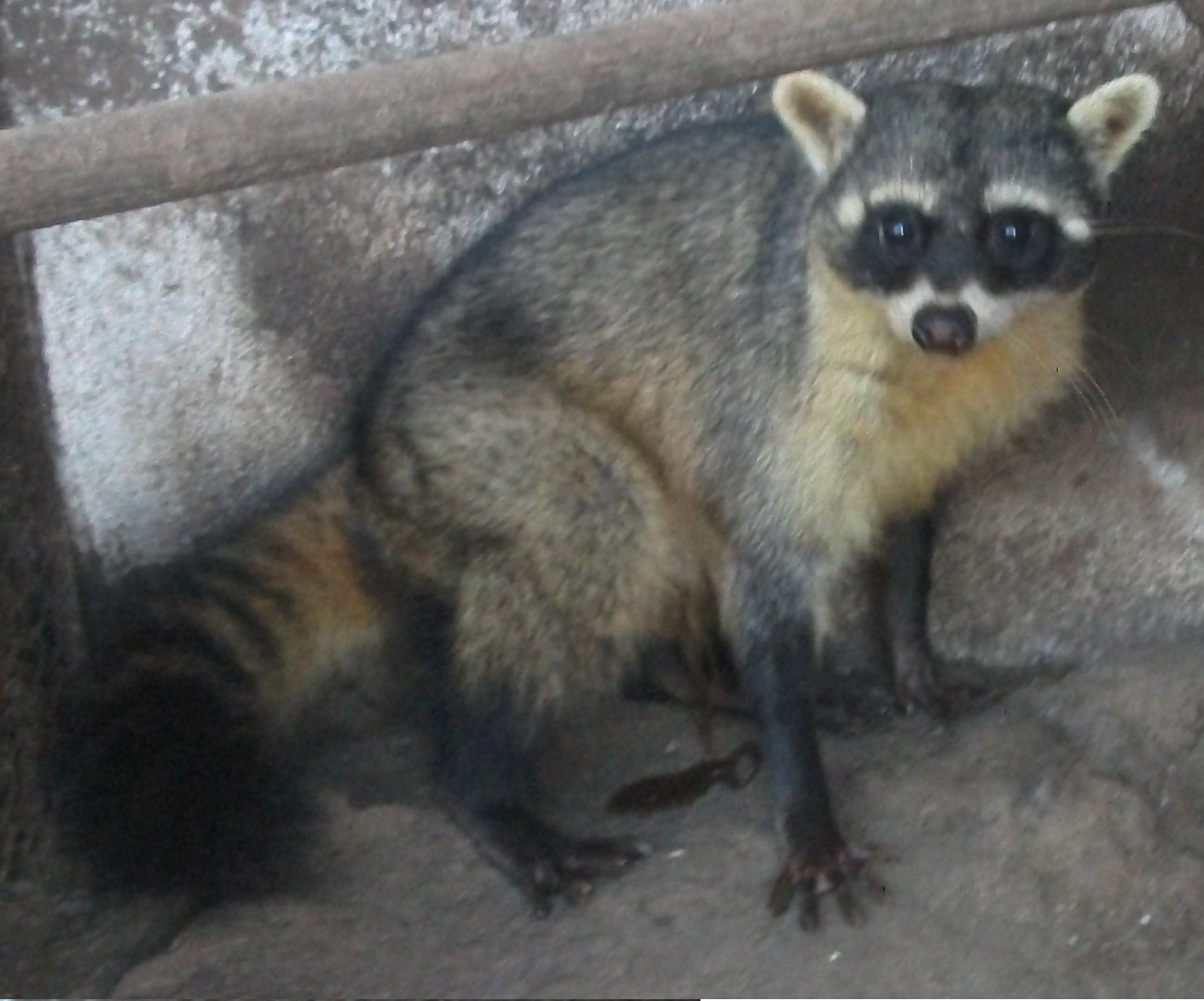
- An individual at Reserva de Fauna Carmelo, Uruguay

Conservation status
- Least Concern (IUCN 3.1)

Scientific classification
- Kingdom: Animalia
- Phylum: Chordata
- Class: Mammalia
- Order: Carnivora
- Family: Procyonidae
- Genus: Procyon
- Species: P. cancrivorus

Binomial name
- Procyon cancrivorus (G. Cuvier, 1798)

Subspecies
- P. c. cancrivorus; P. c. aequatorialis; P. c. nigripes; P. c. panamensis
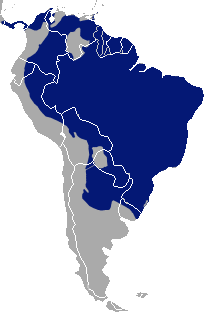
- Crab-eating raccoon range

= Crab-eating raccoon =

Species of carnivore

The crab-eating raccoon, southern raccoon, or South American raccoon (Procyon cancrivorus) is a species of raccoon native to marshy and jungle areas of Central and South America (including Trinidad and Tobago). It is found from Costa Rica south through most areas of South America east of the Andes down to northern Argentina and Uruguay. Despite its name, this species does not feed exclusively on crabs, and the common raccoon also seeks and eats crabs where they are available. In the Tupi–Guarani languages, it is known as aguará or agoará popé.

== Distribution ==
The crab-eating raccoon can be found in South America and parts of Central America. It can be found in Trinidad and Tobago, Costa Rica, Panama, Colombia, Venezuela, Suriname, Guyana, French Guiana, Ecuador, Brazil, Peru, Bolivia, Paraguay, Uruguay, and Argentina.

== Diet and anatomy ==
The crab-eating raccoon eats crabs, lobsters, crayfish, other crustaceans, and shellfish, such as oysters and clams. It is an omnivore and its diet also includes, for example, small amphibians, fish, insects, small turtles, turtle eggs, fruits, nuts, and vegetables. It resembles its northern cousin, the common raccoon, in having a bushy ringed tail and "bandit mask" of fur around its eyes. Unlike the common raccoon, the hair on the nape of the neck points towards the head, rather than backward. The crab-eating raccoon also appears to be more adapted to an arboreal lifestyle than the common raccoon, with sharper, narrower claws. It also is better adapted for a diet of hard-shelled food, with most of the cheek teeth being larger than those of the common raccoon, with broader, rounded cusps. Although the crab-eating raccoon can appear smaller and more streamlined than the common raccoon due to its much shorter fur and more gracile build, the crab-eating raccoon is of similar dimensions to the northern species. Therefore, Allen's rule does not apply to the genus. Head and body length is 41 to 80 cm (16 to 31 in), tail length is 20 to 56 cm (8 to 22 in) and height at the shoulder is about 23 cm (9 in). Weights can range from 2 to 12 kg (4 to 26 lb), though are mostly between 5 and 7 kg (11 and 15 lb). Males are usually larger than the females. It is a host of the intestinal parasite Pachysentis procyonis, an acanthocephalan whose species name is derived from the genus of the crab-eating raccoon.

== Behavior ==
The crab-eating raccoon is solitary and nocturnal, primarily terrestrial but will spend a significant amount of time in trees. It is almost always found near streams, lakes, and rivers. In Panama and Costa Rica, where it is sympatric with the common raccoon, it will be strictly found in inland rivers and streams, while the common raccoon lives in mangrove forests and swamps. In areas of sympatric range raccoons seen in the day time, in areas with people, in mangroves and in swamps will almost certainly be common raccoon. Less frequently, it will reside in evergreen forests or the plains, but are only rarely found in rainforests. Compared to the common raccoon, which thrives in urban environments and adapts quickly to the presence of humans, the crab-eating raccoon adapts less easily and is much less likely to be found in human environments.

== Reproduction ==
The crab-eating raccoon breeds between July and September, and gestation lasts between 60 and 73 days. Offspring are born in crevices, hollow trees, or abandoned nests from other creatures. Between two and seven kits are born, with three being the average. While typically crab-eating raccoons only breed once per year, if a female loses all her kits early in the season, they will mate again and have a second litter. Males have no part in raising young, and while attending to young, females will become much more territorial and will not tolerate other raccoons around them.

== Gallery ==
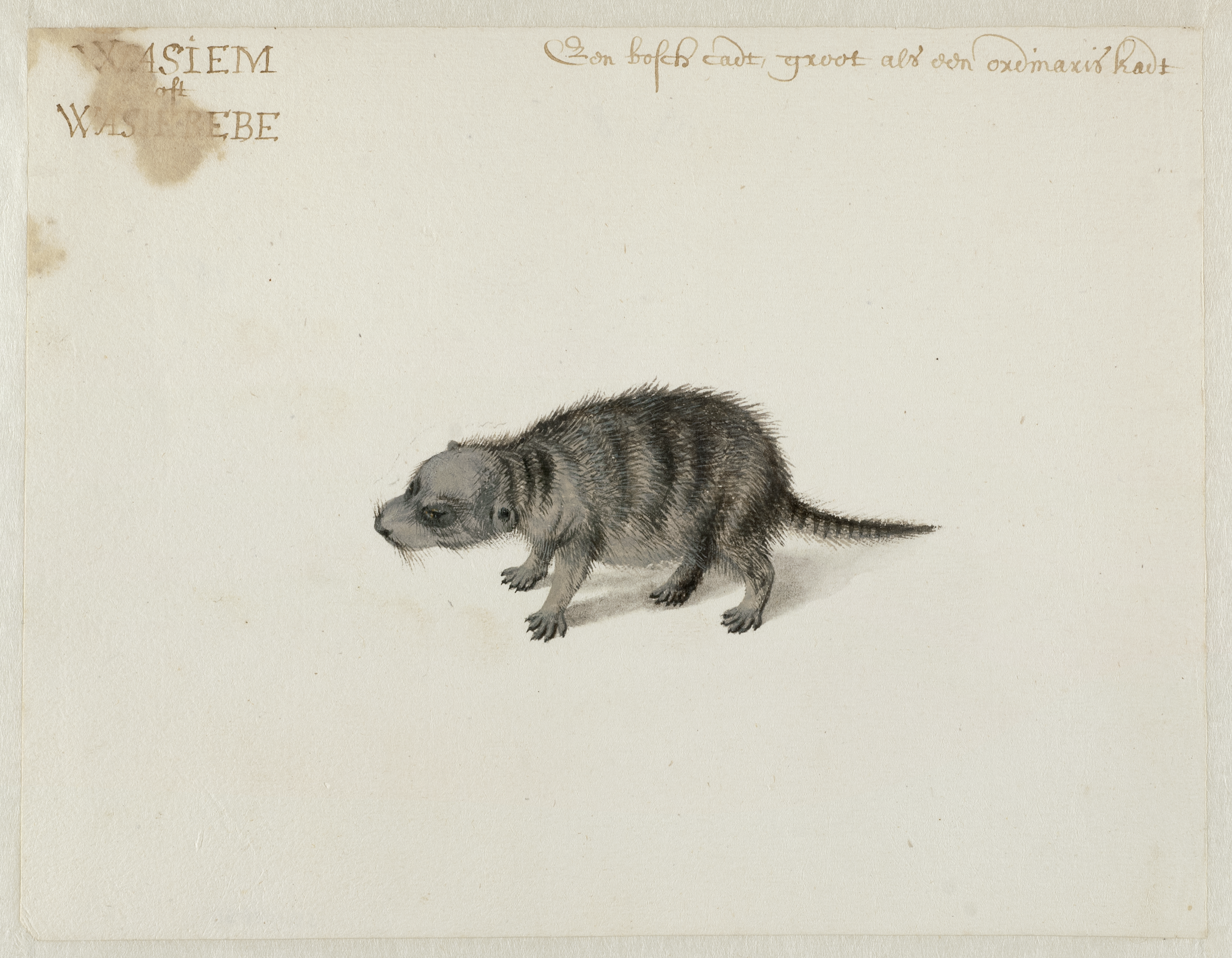
Drawing of a crab-eating raccoon drawn between 1637–1644 by Frans Post

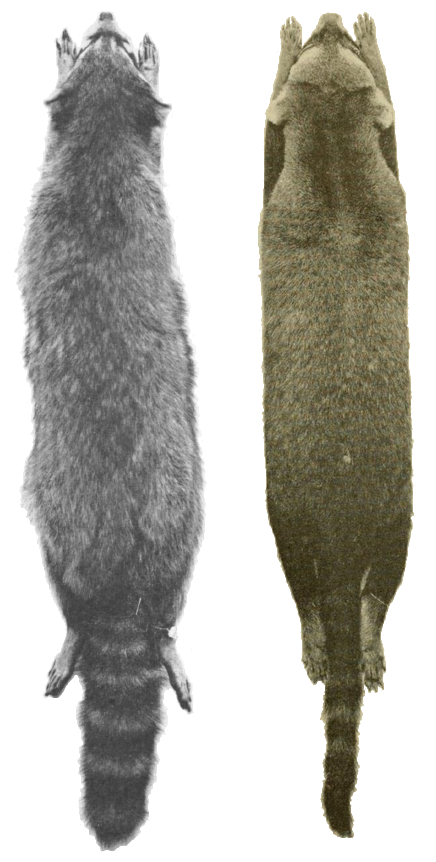
Skins of a common raccoon (left) and crab-eating raccoon (right)

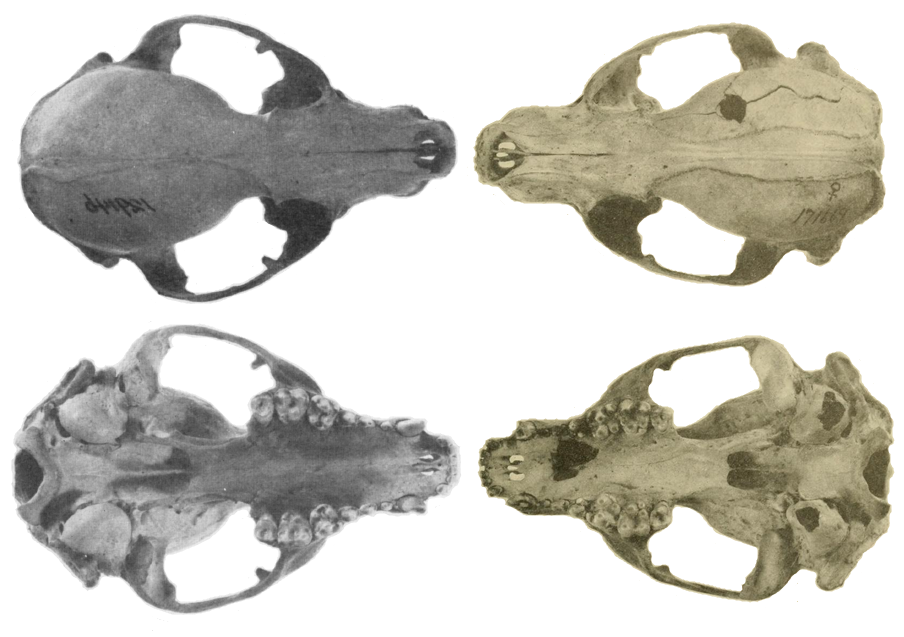
Skulls of a common raccoon (left) and crab-eating raccoon (right)

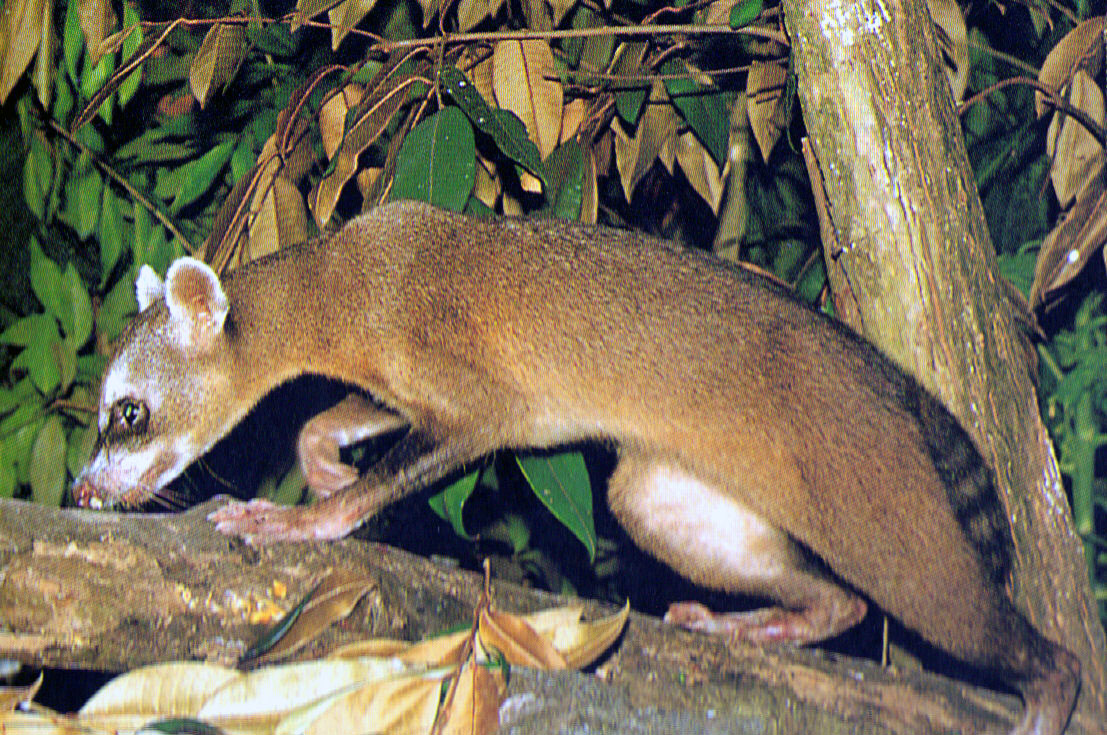
A crab-eating raccoon with a brown coat and a smaller facial mask

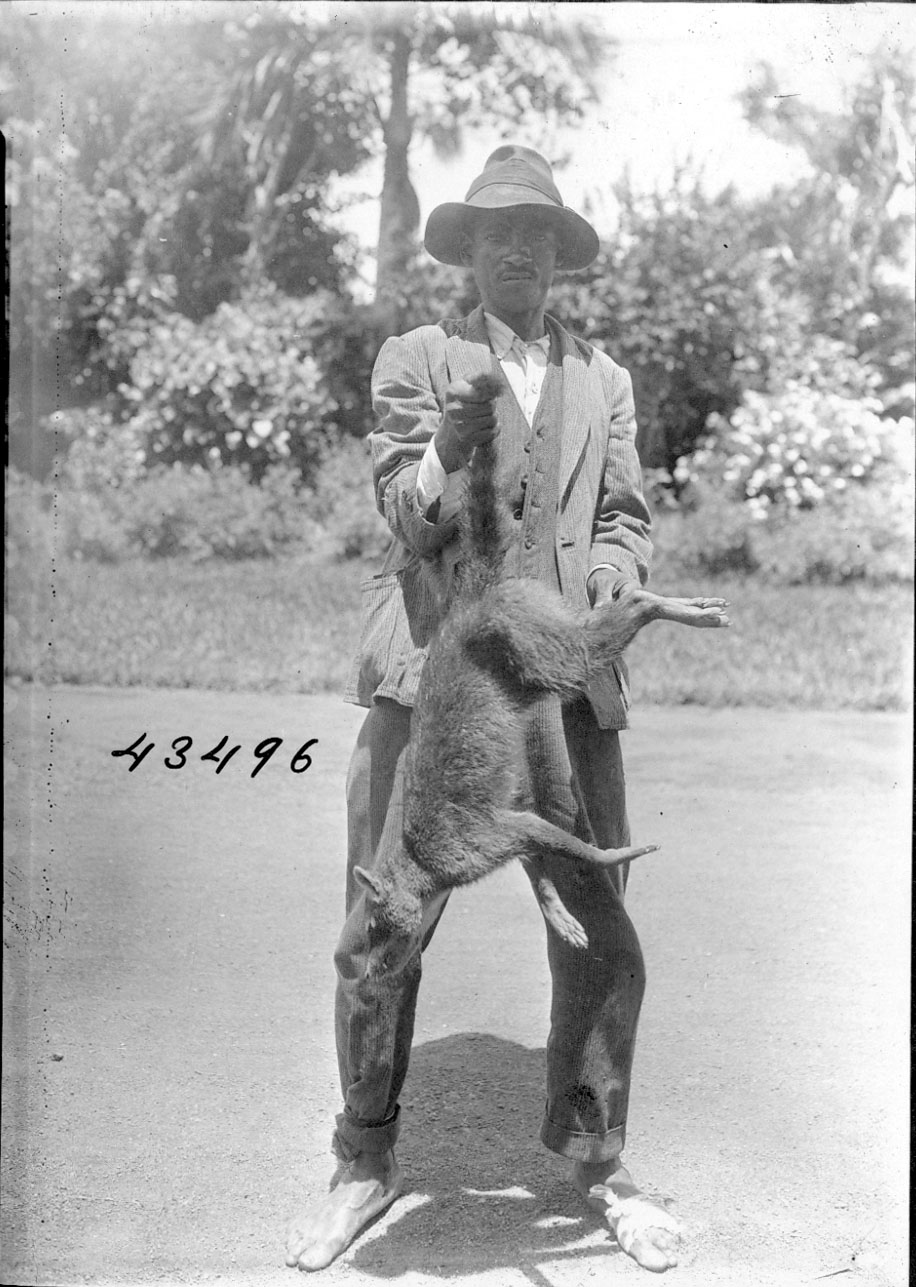
A man holding a dead crab-eating raccoon in Guyana, 1922
