= Johann Rudolph Rengger =

Swiss zoologist

- Born: 13 January 1795; Baden (Swiss)
- Died: 9 October 1832; Aarau
- Known for: Reise nach Paraguay in den Jahren 1818 bis 1826
- Scientific career
- Fields: Zoologist

Johann Rudolph Rengger (1795–1832) was a Swiss naturalist and medical doctor, author of a book on exploration in Paraguay.

He published a work on the physiology of insects. He also studied the fauna of Paraguay, and published in 1835 a Reise nach Paraguay in den Jahren 1818 bis 1826.

== Early life ==
Johann Rudolf Rengger was born in Baden as the son of the pastor Samuel Rengger. Since his parents died early, his uncle Albrecht Rengger, then Interior Minister of the Helvetic Republic, provided his education, first at a private school, and then at the canton school of Aarau from 1805 to 1812. He later studied natural sciences and medicine in Lausanne and Tübingen. In 1817 he published the results of his research on insects under the title Physiological investigations on the animal housekeeping of Insects and thus earned on October 12 of the same year the degree of Doctor of Medicine.

== The Paraguayan trip ==
After a stay in Paris, Rengger decided, together with doctor M. Longchamp from the canton of Vaud, to undertake a research trip to South America. On May 1, 1818, they embarked in Le Havre and arrived in Buenos-Aires on July 1. Here, their attention soon turned on to the secure conditions of Paraguay. So they went up to the Entre Ríos Province, waited for eight months in Corrientes because the leader Artigas had blocked the stream traffic, and didn't reach Asunción until July 30, 1819. Afterwards, Rengger began to explore the wildlife of Paraguay and described himself the way he conducted his research:

I lived for six years in these lands whose capital, Asunción, was my usual abode. From there I traveled the country in all directions, but visited preferably the less populated and very desolate regions. Every year, for example, I spent several months outdoor, in isolated dairies, sometimes in deserted jungles. During these journeys, and since time did not count, I focused my attention on natural history, on the life in this wilderness through the beauty and the greatness of the surrounding nature, and with this satisfaction, regardless of overcome dangers and difficulties that did not really attract me, I therefore used the resulting leisure time to dedicate myself to zoological observations. From the majority of mammal species, I observed a fairly large number of individuals, I determined their characteristic features and the variations they offered according to sex, age, season, and individuality, and studied the animals often for days to learn their household in their wild state. At the same time, I spared neither effort nor cost of keeping alive animals and raising them in our dwelling, which gave me much new information about their behavior and their temperament, and especially about the changes that they undergo with age.

— Rengger, Johann Rudolph (1835), Reise nach Paraguay in den Jahren 1818 bis 1826, pages xix-xx

However, at the time of these explorations, Paraguay was virtually isolated from the outside world by the dictator José Gaspar Rodríguez de Francia. For example, the French explorer and botanist Aimé Bonpland was arrested as a spy and detained at Santa Maria. On their side, Rengger and Lonchamp were not allowed to cross the strictly guarded border, and had to request a special permit for each excursion. While Longchamp mostly remained in the capital, Rengger used all the permissions given for his naturalist research. Despite this scientific activity, there was a lack of contact with educated men and correspondence with foreign countries, especially with the homeland, because the dictator had all incoming and outgoing letters intercepted, so that the relatives of Rengger received only a little news of his situation. In 1825, they unexpectedly obtained an exit permit, but had only a few hours to prepare, with Longchamp packing the smaller part of his collections. On May 25, 1825, they left Paraguay, returning to Le Havre via Buenos Aires, Bahia, and Pernambuco.

== Return to Europe ==
Rengger returned to Europe on February 25, 1826, after almost eight years of absence. After a short stay in Paris, where he became acquainted with Alexander von Humboldt and Georges Cuvier, Rengger arrived in Aarau on March 16. He immediately proceeded to organize and compile his careful and exact observations and present the results of his research. However, because people were interested in the enigmatic personality of the dictator of Paraguay, Rengger first published the Historical essay on the revolution of Paraguay and the Dictatorial government of Doctor Francia (1827). Book sections concerning the dictator had previously appeared under the title Doctor Francia in the Stuttgarter Morgenblatt (1827, No. 140-145), to which the dictator responded in The Times on November 6, 1830. Rengger then completed his work on natural history and published his book on the mammals of Paraguay, which met with great interest in scientific circles (1830). After that, he worked on a description of his journey to Paraguay intended for a more general readership.

In the fall of 1831 Rengger travelled to Italy, where he fell ill with pneumonia in Naples on February 15, 1832. After a partial recovery, he was able to return to his homeland, but his condition soon worsened, and he died at the age of 37 on October 9, 1832, in Aarau. In 1835, his uncle Albrecht Rengger and his brother-in-law Ferdinand Wydler published the Journey to Paraguay., with valuable observations about land, people, and animals.

== Taxonomic descriptions ==
Johann Rudolph Rengger described several taxa:

- an echimyid rodent, the long-tailed spiny rat: Proechimys longicaudatus (Rengger, 1830);
- a chinchillid rodent, the plains viscacha: Viscacia (Rengger, 1830), which is a genus synonym for Lagostomus;
- a cricetid rodent, the large vesper mouse: Calomys callosus (Rengger, 1830);
- a primate, the Azaras's capuchin: Cebus azarae (Rengger, 1830), which is a species synonym for Sapajus cay;
- an orb web weaving spider: Parawixia bistriata (Rengger, 1836).

== See also ==
- Bonpland, Aimé (1773-1858)
- von Humboldt, Alexander (1769-1859)
