= Prosthenorchis =

Scientific classification
- Kingdom: Animalia
- Phylum: Acanthocephala
- Class: Archiacanthocephala
- Order: Oligacanthorhynchida
- Family: Oligacanthorhynchidae
- Genus: Prosthenorchis; Travassos, 1915

Genus of worms

Prosthenorchis is a genus of parasitic worms belonging to the family Oligacanthorhynchidae. Prosthenorchis have a trunk up to 50 mm long, a proboscis that is not ornate with three barbed hooks in each of 12 rows. They have complex hook roots with large manubria, and a small discoid posterior hook base. There are up to 23 festoons. Gonopore is subterminal. The primary host are primates in South America and Felidae in Africa with cockroaches and beetles as intermediate hosts.

== Taxonomy ==
Phylogenetic analysis had been performed on P.elegans.

== Description ==
Prosthenorchis consists of a proboscis covered in hooks and a trunk.

== Species ==
THere are five species in the genus Prosthenorchis. (Note: A binomial authority in parentheses indicates that the species was originally described in a genus other than the present genus.)

- Prosthenorchis cerdocyonis Gomes, Olifiers, Souza, Barbosa, D'Andrea & Maldonado Jr., 2015

The species is named after the genus of the host, the Crab-Eating Fox (Cerdocyon thous).

- Prosthenorchis elegans (Diesing, 1851)
- Prosthenorchis fraterna (Baer, 1959)
- Prosthenorchis lemuri Machado-Filho, 1950
- Prosthenorchis sinicus Hu-Jiand, 1990

== Distribution ==
The species of this genus are found in America.

== Hosts ==
Life cycle of Acanthocephala.

The life cycle of an acanthocephalan consists of three stages beginning when an infective acanthor (development of an egg) is released from the intestines of the definitive host and then ingested by an arthropod, the intermediate host. The intermediate hosts of most Pachysentis species are not known. When the acanthor molts, the second stage called the acanthella begins. This stage involves penetrating the wall of the mesenteron or the intestine of the intermediate host and growing. The final stage is the infective cystacanth which is the larval or juvenile state of an Acanthocephalan, differing from the adult only in size and stage of sexual development. The cystacanths within the intermediate hosts are consumed by the definitive host, usually attaching to the walls of the intestines, and as adults they reproduce sexually in the intestines. The acanthor are passed in the feces of the definitive host and the cycle repeats.

Hosts for Prosthenorchis species

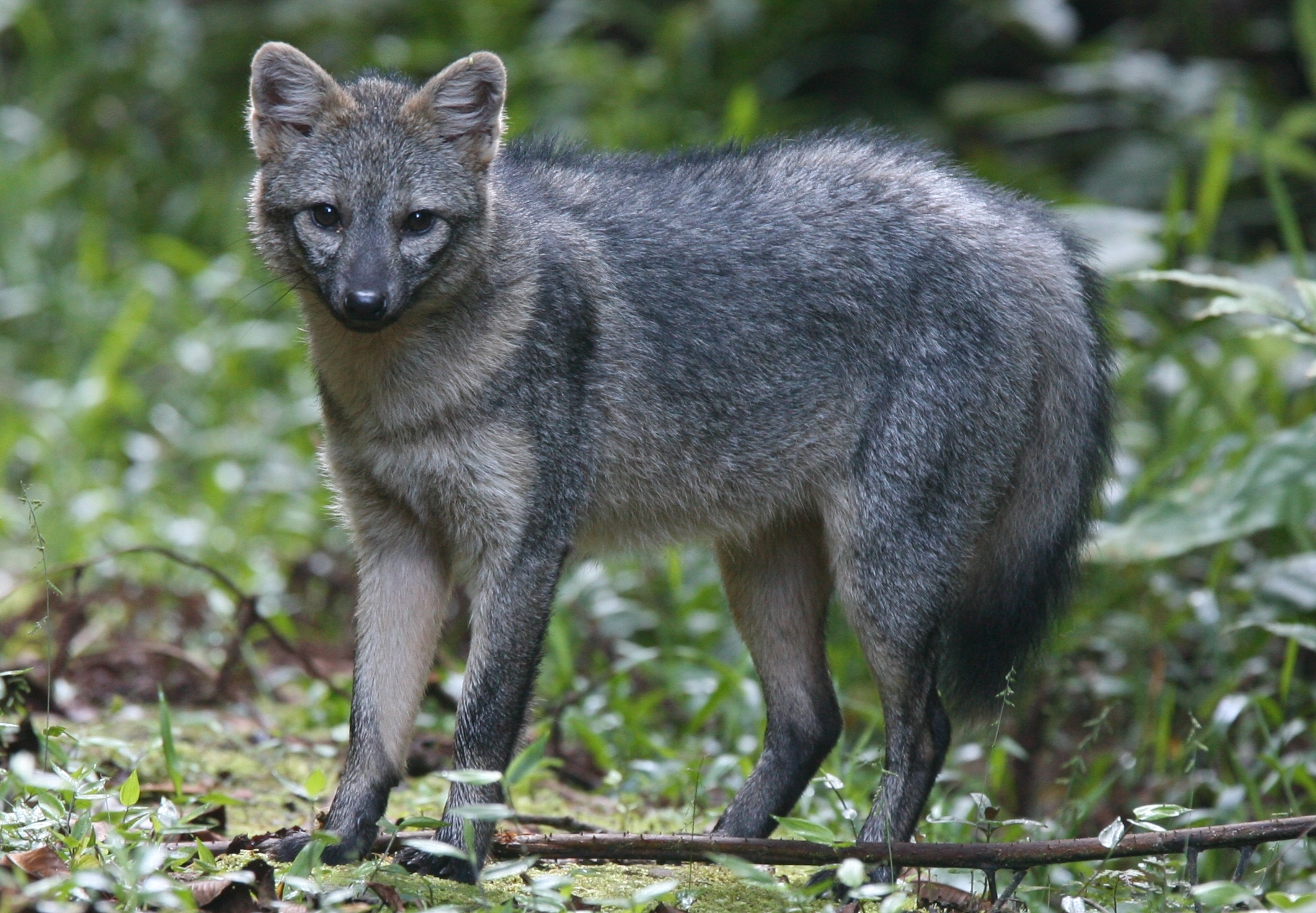
The tayra is one of the hosts of P. cerdocyonis
