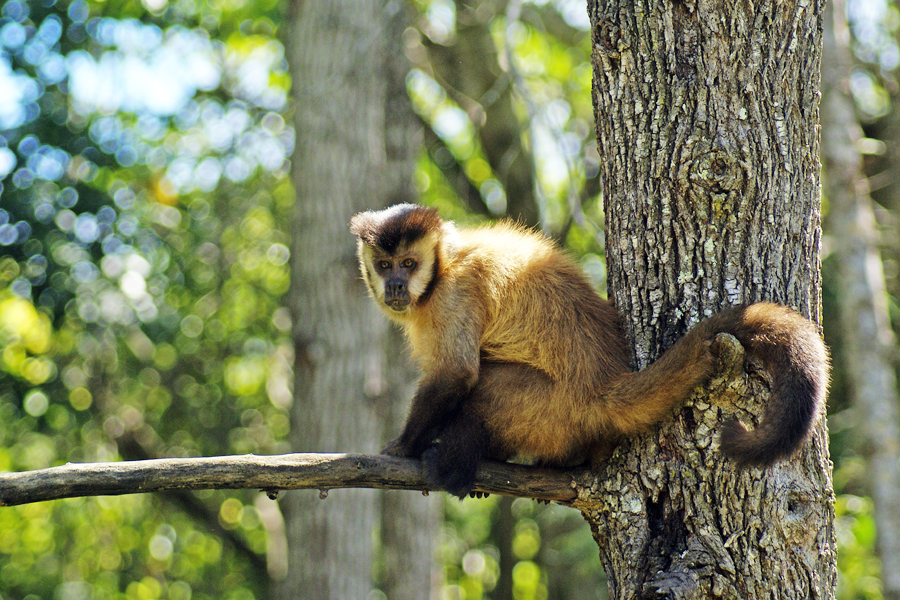
- Azaras's capuchin in the Pantanal, Brazil

Conservation status
- Vulnerable (IUCN 3.1)

Scientific classification
- Kingdom: Animalia
- Phylum: Chordata
- Class: Mammalia
- Infraclass: Placentalia
- Order: Primates
- Family: Cebidae
- Genus: Sapajus
- Species: S. cay

Binomial name
- Sapajus cay (Illiger, 1815)
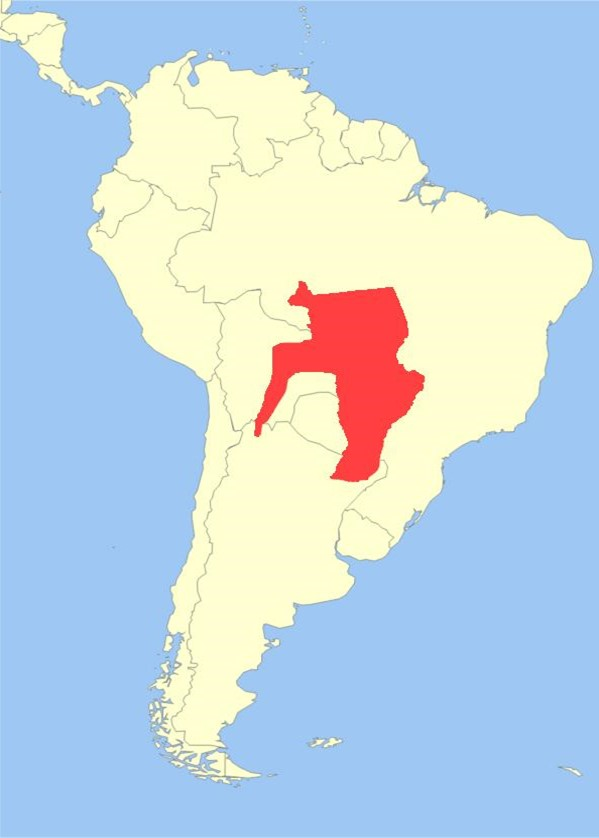
- Range

Synonyms
- Cebus libidinosus paraguayanus Fischer, 1829; Cebus azarae Rengger, 1830

= Azaras's capuchin =

Species of New World monkey

Azaras's capuchin or hooded capuchin (Sapajus cay) is a species of robust capuchin. It occurs in eastern Paraguay, southeastern Bolivia, northern Argentina, and Brazil, at Mato Grosso do Sul and Mato Grosso states, in Pantanal. Its habitat consists of subtropical, humid, semi-deciduous, gallery forests and forested regions of the Pantanals. Formerly, it was considered a subspecies of black-striped capuchin, according to Groves (2005) with the name Cebus libidinosus paraguayanus, but Silva Jr. (2001) considered it a separated species. They are considered as frugivores-insectivores which means that their diet mainly consists of a variety of fruits, seeds, arthropods, frogs, small mammals, etc.

== Evolution and taxonomy ==
Cebus and Sapajus have been widely recognized as subgenera–or groups–of the capuchin monkey's subfamily Cebinae. There is data hinting towards an estimated separation time between these two subgenera of about 6.2 million years. Evidence indicates that during the Miocene, these two groups diverged from each other due to the emergence of the Amazon river; Cebus (gracile capuchin) expanded northwards towards the Amazon rainforest, and Sapajus (robust capuchin) expanded southwards towards the Atlantic forest. However, during the Pleistocene, Sapajus expanded northwards once again towards the Amazon, becoming sympatric with Cebus. Nowadays, supported by ample evidence, it is accepted that Sapajus and Cebus are two different groups, and even considered two different genera. Silva JS's morphometric analysis categorized Sapajus species into three groups based on their geographical location; the Amazonian species, the species from central South America (south of the Cerrado and north of the Rio Doce), and the species of the Atlantic forest (south of the Rio Doce). Sapajus cay belongs to the second group.

Phylogenetic analysis revealed that Sapajus cay was the product of the second divergence event (following Sapajus nigritus robustus) that occurred in the Atlantic forest group before the Sapajus expansion towards the Amazon during the Pleistocene. However, the true current distribution of the Sapajus cay is a matter of debate between leading parties, and it is mainly due to the phenotypic characteristics of populations that live in different geographical locations.

== Characteristics ==
Azara's capuchin monkeys are considered as one of the tufted capuchins, but the tuft will fully develop only after the individual reaches adulthood. Sexual maturity is estimated to be reached at the age of 4–5 years old for females, and around 8 years old for males. In captivity, individuals can live up to 50 years, while in the wild the average is around 30 years. This species of capuchin monkey presents slight sexual dimorphism; the male being larger in body size. The female weighs between 1.4–3.4 kg (3.1–7.5 lb), whereas the male can weigh between 1.3–4.8 kg (2.9–10.6 lb). The average male individual averages a height of 0.8m from nose to tail, while the female is slightly shorter. They have long feet and tails; the tails can be as long as half their body height. Another distinction from the rest of the Sapajus species–according to Silva–is that the S. cay (Sapajus cay) has significantly smaller cranium size, even at adulthood.

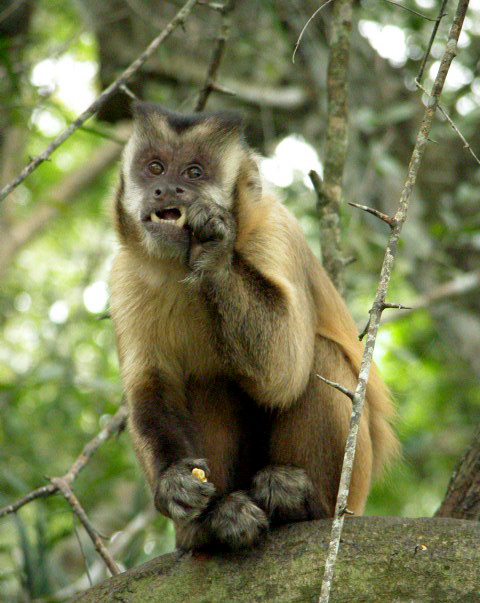
Azara's capuchin monkey (Sapajus cay) eating.

They normally present medium-length fur with several different tones of brown throughout the body. Their limbs are usually a darker colour, as well as their tuft. Compared to the rest of the Sapajus species, S. cay exhibits a dark stripe of hair on the front of their ears, which resembles sideburns. There has been major disagreements on the true taxonomic nature of these species because of their high morphological variability. S. cay individuals exhibit inter and intra-population polymorphism, they also exhibit sexual dimorphism and significant changes in their morphology at different ages.

== Ecology and behaviour ==
They are diurnal opportunistic omnivores, who live in social communities and travel throughout their territory looking for food. Research indicates that these capuchins spend most of their time resting, travelling and foraging. While there were significant differences in the behaviours of males and females, there were not many significant differences in their diet.

=== Diet ===
Males were observed to spend more time on the ground or near it, resting and surveying the area. Females, on the other hand, spend significantly more time browsing and eating on the canopy of the sleeping trees. These differences in behaviours is attributed to the only difference in their diet. Males tend to eat larger objects than females (prey or plant matter); noticeably, only large males have been seen eating small vertebrates. This difference in the size of the meal is thought to be the reason why males spend more time resting (digesting), while the females spend more time foraging in order to compensate for the smaller size of their meals. Research showed that regardless of the sex, the largest part of their diet are fruits, followed by seeds; lastly, plant parts and invertebrates constituted the rest of their diet. It is a host of the acanthocephalan intestinal parasite Pachysentis rugosus.

=== Social dynamics ===
The size of groups can vary greatly, some can be less than a dozen individuals, whereas some groups have been recorded to have up to 44 individuals. Their groups consist of a multi-male/multi-female dynamic, with an alpha male who is usually the largest and most ferocious. This alpha male typically serves as a protective figure, who also controls the access to food, and has priority to mate with the females. These groups normally travel continuously throughout their home range, without leaving its boundaries. Only under extreme conditions will they choose to explore new territories. Research indicates that these species have the ability to learn and retain information for long periods of time, which is a key quality for their high adaptability. Long-term memory serves as a tool in order to recognize patterns for profitable and dangerous phenomena. Tujage et al. (2015) were able to show that individuals can deduce that if one fruit tree is producing fruit, then all the others of the same species must be producing as well, so the individuals would actively look for these.

=== Other behaviours ===
Many behaviours similar to other capuchin species have been observed in some communities, but their exact reasons have not been concretely proven. Some individuals have been seen to rub the leaves of certain citrus trees on their fur, while exhibiting other protective behaviours. It is thought that this behaviour is triggered when threats are near, and the strong smell of the leaves play a part.

Tool use has also been documented in S. cay individuals. Even though the consumption of hard shelled fruits and seeds is not preferred, it forms part of their diet. These capuchins hold the object with both hands, and smash it against tree branches that act as an anvil. High ranking adults are especially successful at this, while low ranking adults will sometimes wait for the leftovers of the processed food.

== Distribution and habitat ==
The habitat of the capuchin's monkey species, respectively Cebus and Sapajus, is located in the tropical and subtropical forests of South and Central America. Though they occupy a wide range of territory, their population currently only reside on nearly 200 hectares (around 500 acres). Their habitat is hot and humid all year round, with high quantity of precipitation and vegetation. They have a high level of behavioural as well as ecological flexibility, allowing them to reside in a wide range of habitats, including bush lands and savannas. In fact, the Sapajus cay species habitat is distributed among countries such as northern Argentina, south-eastern Bolivia, and eastern Paraguay.

They also inhabit Brazil, where they are located southwest of the Amazon, approximately south to the states of Mato Grosso, Mato Grosso do Sul, as well as southeast of Goiás state. Some populations of Sapajus Cay monkeys reside in northern Argentina, in the provinces of Jujuy, Salta, Formosa and Chaco. The Sapajus Cay is also the only representative of its genus established in Paraguay, where they are located in the humid semi deciduous Alto Parana Atlantic Forest.

== Endangerment and threats ==
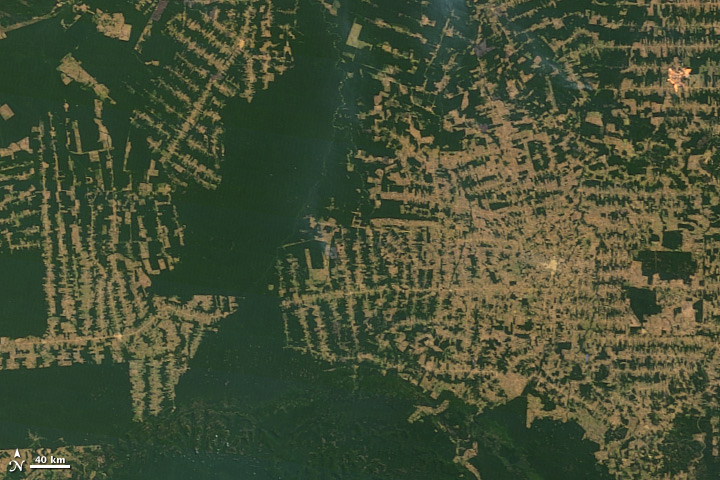
Deforestation of the Amazon rain forest in Brazil. A big threat for Sapajus cay's habitats.

To this day, it is reported that there are no major threats for the Sapajus cay species in Paraguay. Indigenous peoples hunt this species for food, but their population is low, hence not creating a significant threat. The only threat in Paraguay is forest loss due to anthropogenic causes or natural disasters. It is estimated that Sapajus cay monkeys are the most common kept primate pet in Paraguay, hence there is awareness of its threats, assisting conservation efforts.

However in Brazil, the Sapajus cay species are listed as highly vulnerable. In fact, there are many extreme threats to the species survival rate. These include fire, rural settlements, agriculture, livestock keeping, urban sprawl, vulnerability to epidemics, deforestation, increasing road and energy infrastructure, habitat isolation, habitat reduction, pollution, hunting and life capture for pet trade. High population-density in areas South and Central America as well as legal and illegal selective logging, is destroying the Sapajus cay wildlife, ruining the fragment of forests they inhabit.

In addition, their populations inhabiting what is left of the Argentinian forest are subject to serious threats as a consequence of habitat modification and conversion for agriculture production, as well as poaching (illegal hunting). Industrialization has altered the natural environment, negatively affecting Argentina's ecosystems. This can potentially result in inter-species pathogenic exchange, therefore increasing the death rate of the Sapajus Cay.

== Conservation ==
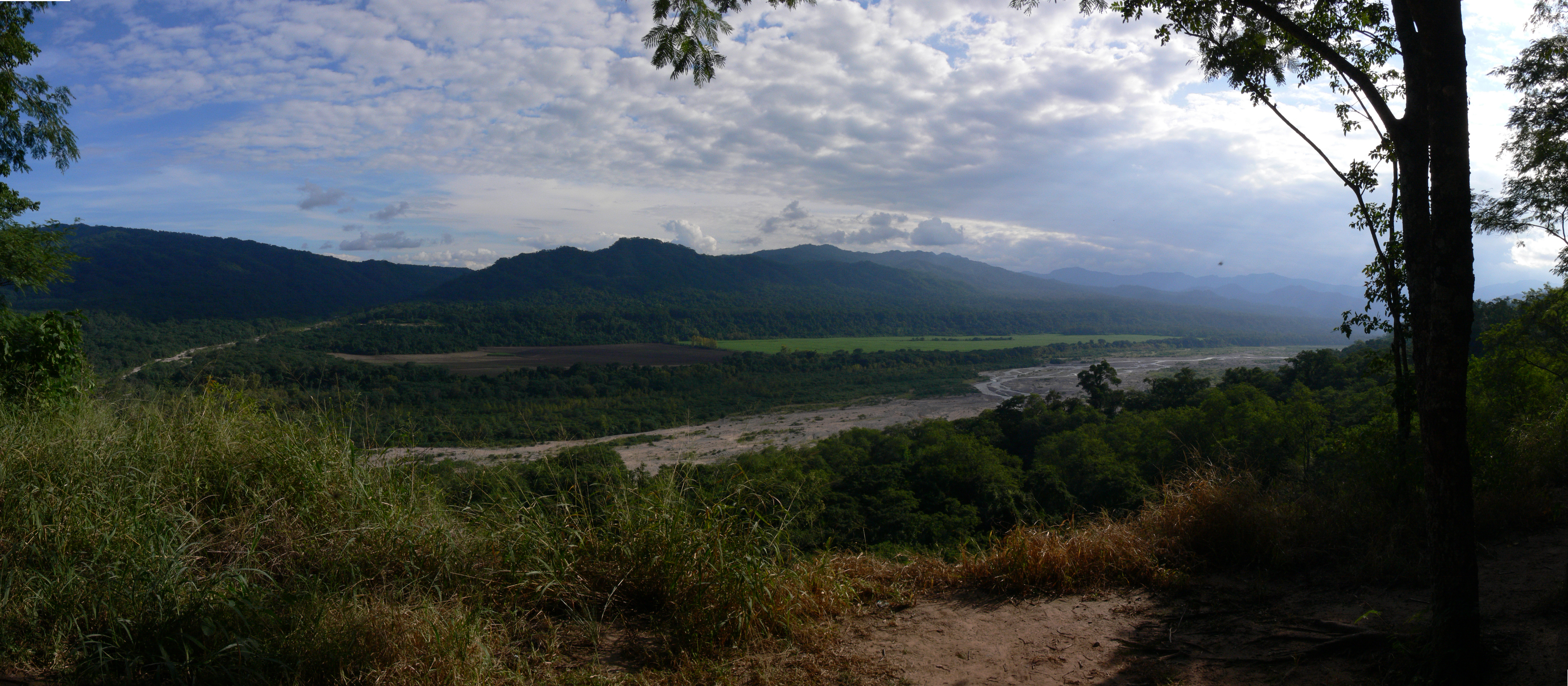
Calilegua National Park - View of San Lorenzo Rio. One of the Sapajus cay conservation zones in Argentina.

In Brazil, the Azara's capuchin monkey has not been well studied, resulting in poor conservation actions due to lack of ecological knowledge of this species. The Sapajus cay species is in danger, with threat of extinction. Drastic regional conservation actions are required for their survival.

In Argentina, the Azara's capuchin is conserved and protected in these following areas; El Rey National Park(44,162 ha), Calilegua National Park, the Province of Jujuy (76,000 ha), and in Baritú National Park (72,000 ha).

In Bolivia, they are protected in Kaa-Iya National Park.

In Brazil, they are protected in Pantanal Matogrossense National Park, Serra da Bodoquena National Park (77,021 ha), Rio Negro State Park (7,000 ha), Segredo Stream State Park (189 ha), SESC Pantanal Private Reserve (RPPN) (106,31 ha), Fazenda Acurizal Private Reserve (13,665 ha), Fazenda Penha Private Reserve (RPPN) (13,409 ha), Fazenda Boqueirão Private Reserve (RPPN) (173,60 ha), Fazenda Singapura Private Reserve (RPPN) (456 ha), the Fazenda América Private Reserve (RPPN) (401 ha), Fazenda Trevo Private Reserve (RPPN) (27,75 ha), the Fazenda Floresta Negra Private reserve (RPPN) (971,06 ha), Fazenda Nova Querência Private Reserve (50 ha in 8,500 ha of Gallery Forest) and the Fazenda São Marcos (600 ha).
