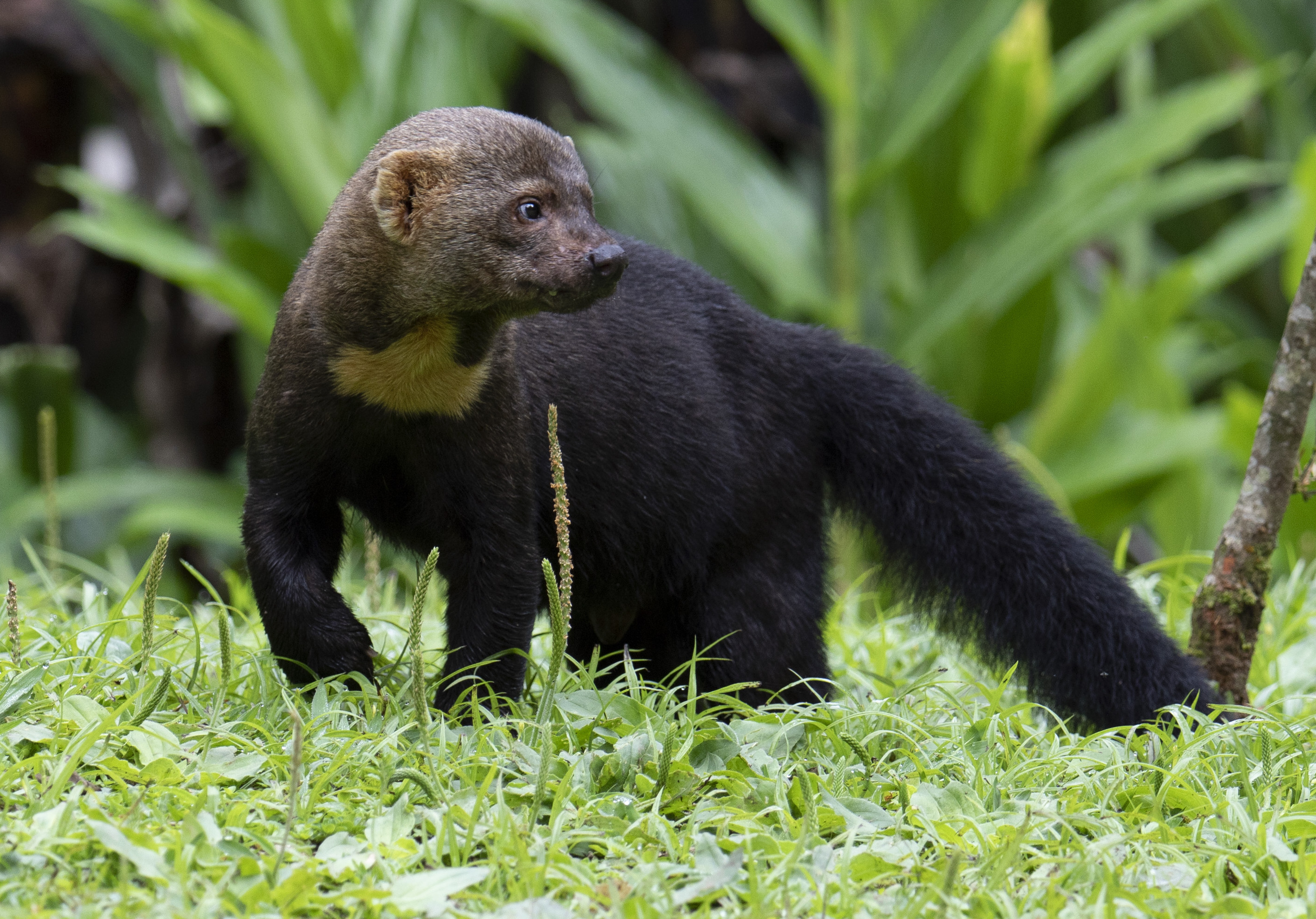
- A male tayra, Brazil

Conservation status
- Least Concern (IUCN 3.1)
- CITES Appendix III

Scientific classification
- Kingdom: Animalia
- Phylum: Chordata
- Class: Mammalia
- Order: Carnivora
- Family: Mustelidae
- Subfamily: Guloninae
- Genus: Eira; Hamilton Smith, 1842
- Species: E. barbara

Binomial name
- Eira barbara (Linnaeus, 1758)
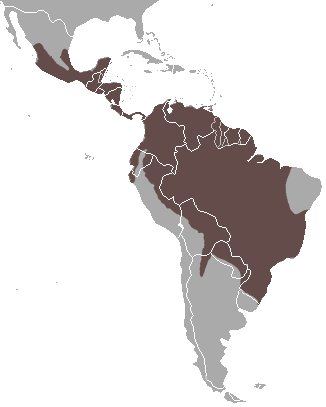
- Tayra range

Synonyms
- Mustela barbara Linnaeus, 1758

= Tayra =

Genus of carnivores

The tayra (Eira barbara) is an omnivorous animal from the mustelid family, native to the Americas. It is the only species in the genus Eira.

Tayras are also known as the tolomuco or perico ligero in Central America, motete in Honduras, irara in Brazil, san hol or viejo de monte in the Yucatan Peninsula, and high-woods dog (or historically chien bois) in Trinidad. The genus name Eira is derived from the indigenous name of the animal in Bolivia and Peru, while barbara means "strange" or "foreign".

== Description ==
Tayras are long, agile mustelids, similar in appearance to a large fisher or marten, but slightly more reminiscent of a sleeker, smaller wolverine. They range from 56 to 71 cm (22 to 28 in) in length, not including their 37- to 46-cm-long (15 to 18 in) bushy tail, and weigh 2.7 to 7.0 kg (6.0 to 15.4 lb). Males are larger and slightly more muscular than females. They have short, dark brown to black fur, which is relatively uniform in length and color across the body, limbs, and tail—except for a yellowish or orange "heart"-shaped spot on the chest. Each tayra's chest patch is unique in color, shape and size, and thus may be used by biologists, rescuers and other specialists to identify individuals. The fur on the head and neck is lighter, typically tan or greyish in colour. Albino, white, or beige-yellow individuals are also known, with genetic color morphs being not nearly as rare in tayras as among other mustelids.

The feet have toes of unequal length with tips that form a strongly curved line when held together. The claws are short and curved, but strong, being adapted for climbing and running rather than digging. The pads of the feet are hairless, but are surrounded by stiff sensory hairs. The head has small, rounded ears, long sensory whiskers, and black eyes with a blue-green shine. Like other musteloids, tayras possess anal scent glands, albeit not nearly as large, nor as pungent in odor, as in other species. Additionally, tayras typically only employ scent-marking for territorial demarcation and identifying other animals in the vicinity, and not as a self-defense tactic, such as with skunks.

== Range and habitat ==
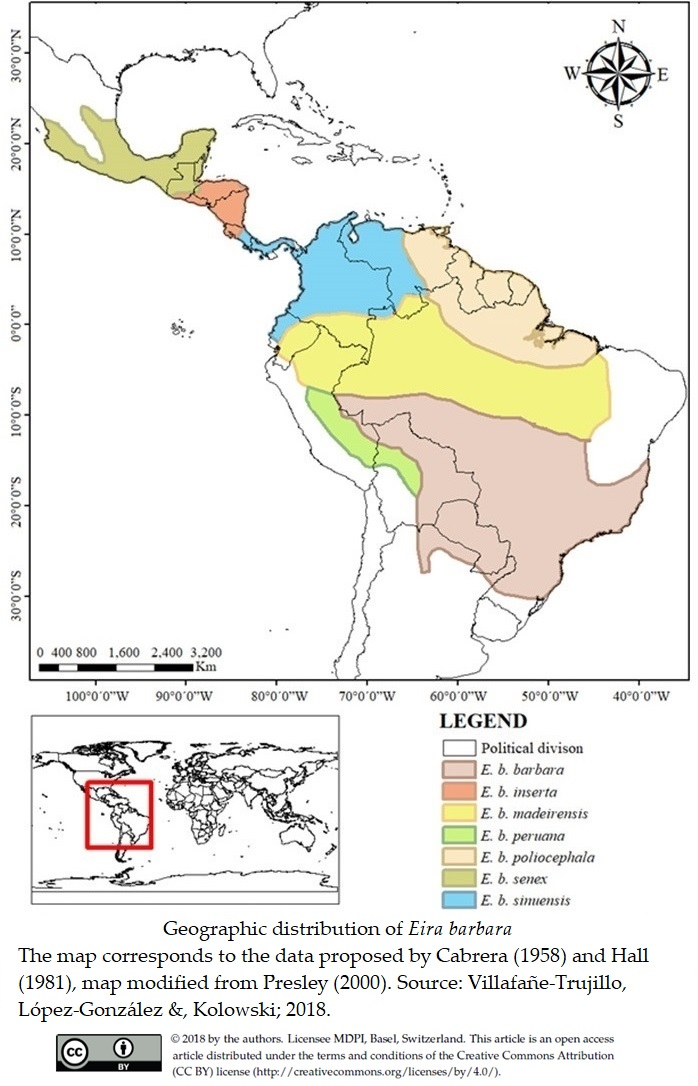
Distribution of tayra subspecies.

Tayras are found across most of South America, with the exceptions of Chile, Uruguay, Argentina (other than the far northern regions) and parts of the Brazilian east coast. They are found across the whole of Central America, where their range begins in Mexico—as far north as Tamaulipas and Veracruz, on the east coast, and south Sinaloa and Nayarit on the west coast—and continues south to Panama. Tayras are also found on the island of Trinidad. They are generally found in only tropical and subtropical forests; still, they may traverse grasslands or other habitats at nighttime, as they move between forest patches, and they also are seen in cultivated areas, tree plantations and farmlands.

=== Subspecies ===
Currently, seven regional subspecies are recognised:

- E. b. barbara (northern Argentina, Paraguay, western Bolivia and central and southern Brazil)
- E. b. inserta (Guatemala to central Costa Rica)
- E. b. madeirensis (western Ecuador to northern Brazil)
- E. b. peruana (the eastern Andean foothills of Peru and Bolivia)
- E. b. poliocephala (eastern Venezuela, Trinidad, the Guianas and northeastern Brazil)
- E. b. senex (central Mexico to northern Honduras)
- E. b. sinuensis (Panama and Colombia to western Venezuela and northern Ecuador)

== Behaviour and diet ==
Tayras are diurnal animals, although occasionally active during the evening or at night. The social behaviour of tayras is not well understood. Assumed solitary, they have been seen in larger groups, presumably of mother and her larger offspring. They are opportunistic omnivores, hunting rodents and other small mammals, as well as birds, lizards, other reptiles, and invertebrates, and climbing trees to get fruit and honey. They locate prey primarily by scent, having relatively poor eyesight, and actively chase it once located, rather than stalking or using ambush tactics.

They are expert climbers, using their long tails for balance. On the ground or on large horizontal tree limbs, they use a bounding gallop when moving at high speeds. They can also leap from treetop to treetop when pursued. They generally avoid water, but are capable of swimming across rivers when necessary.

They live in hollow trees, or burrows in the ground. Individual animals maintain relatively large home ranges, with areas up to 24 km^{2} (9.3 sq mi) having been recorded. They may travel at least 6 km (3.7 mi) in a single night.

An interesting instance of caching has been observed among tayras: a tayra will pick unripe green plantains, which are inedible, and leave them to ripen in a cache, coming back a few days later to consume the softened pulp.

The tayra was found to be a host of an intestinal acanthocephalan parasitic worm, Pachysentis gethi.

== Reproduction ==
Tayras breed year-round, with the females entering estrus several times each year for 3 to 20 days at a time. Unlike some other mustelids, tayras do not exhibit embryonic diapause, and gestation lasts from 63 to 67 days. The female gives birth to one to three young, which she cares for alone.

The young are altricial, being born blind and with closed ears, but are already covered in a full coat of black fur; they weigh about 100 g (3.5 oz) at birth. Their eyes open at 35 to 47 days, and they leave the den shortly thereafter. They begin to take solid food around 70 days of age, and are fully weaned by 100 days. Hunting behaviour begins as early as three months, and the mother initially brings her young wounded or slow prey to practise on as they improve their killing technique. The young are fully grown around 6 months old, and leave their mother to establish their own territory by 10 months.

== Conservation ==
Wild tayra populations are slowly shrinking, especially in Mexico, due to habitat destruction for agricultural purposes. The species is listed as being of least concern.

== Gallery ==
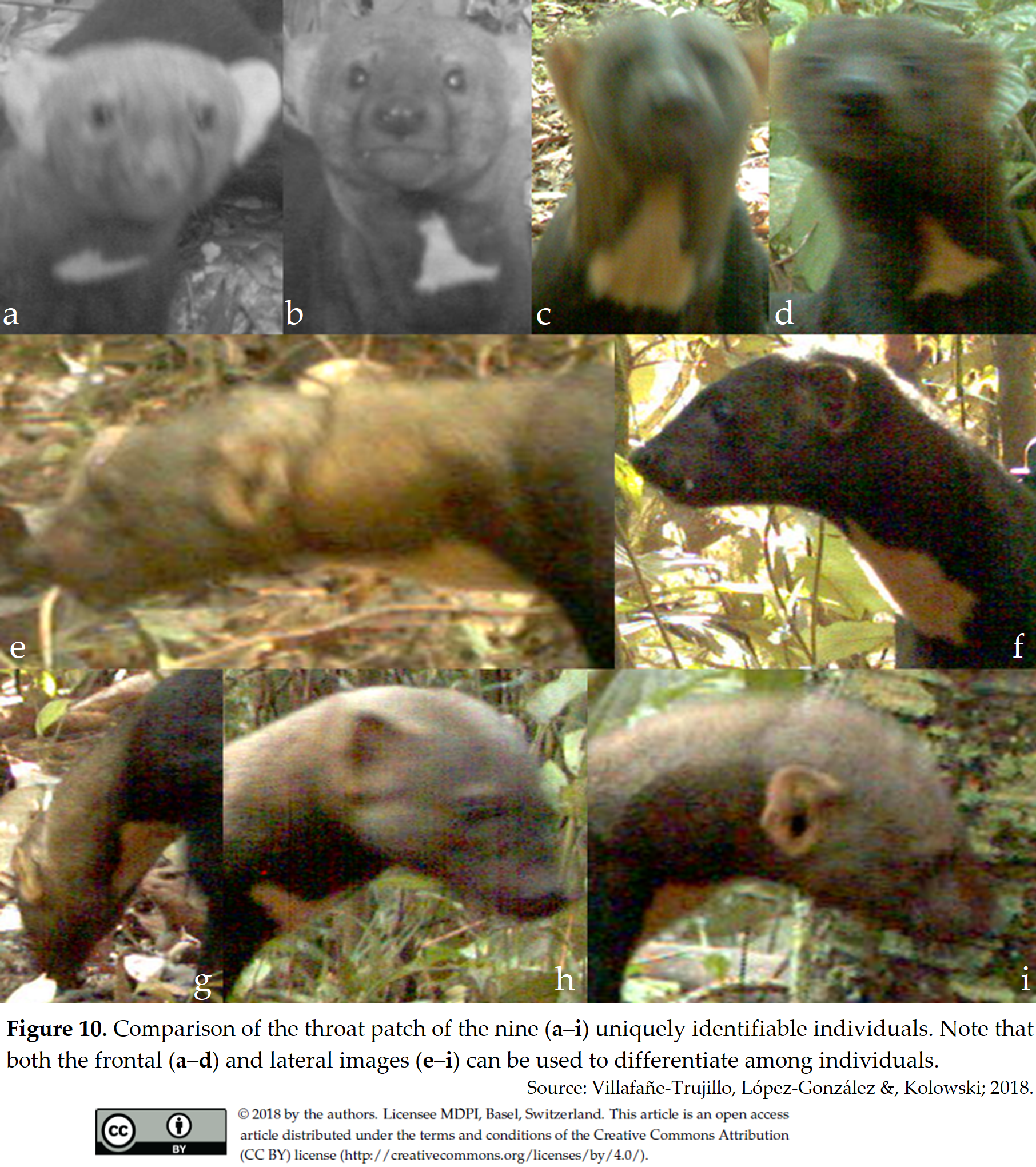
Identified individuals of E. barbara in the Peruvian Amazon

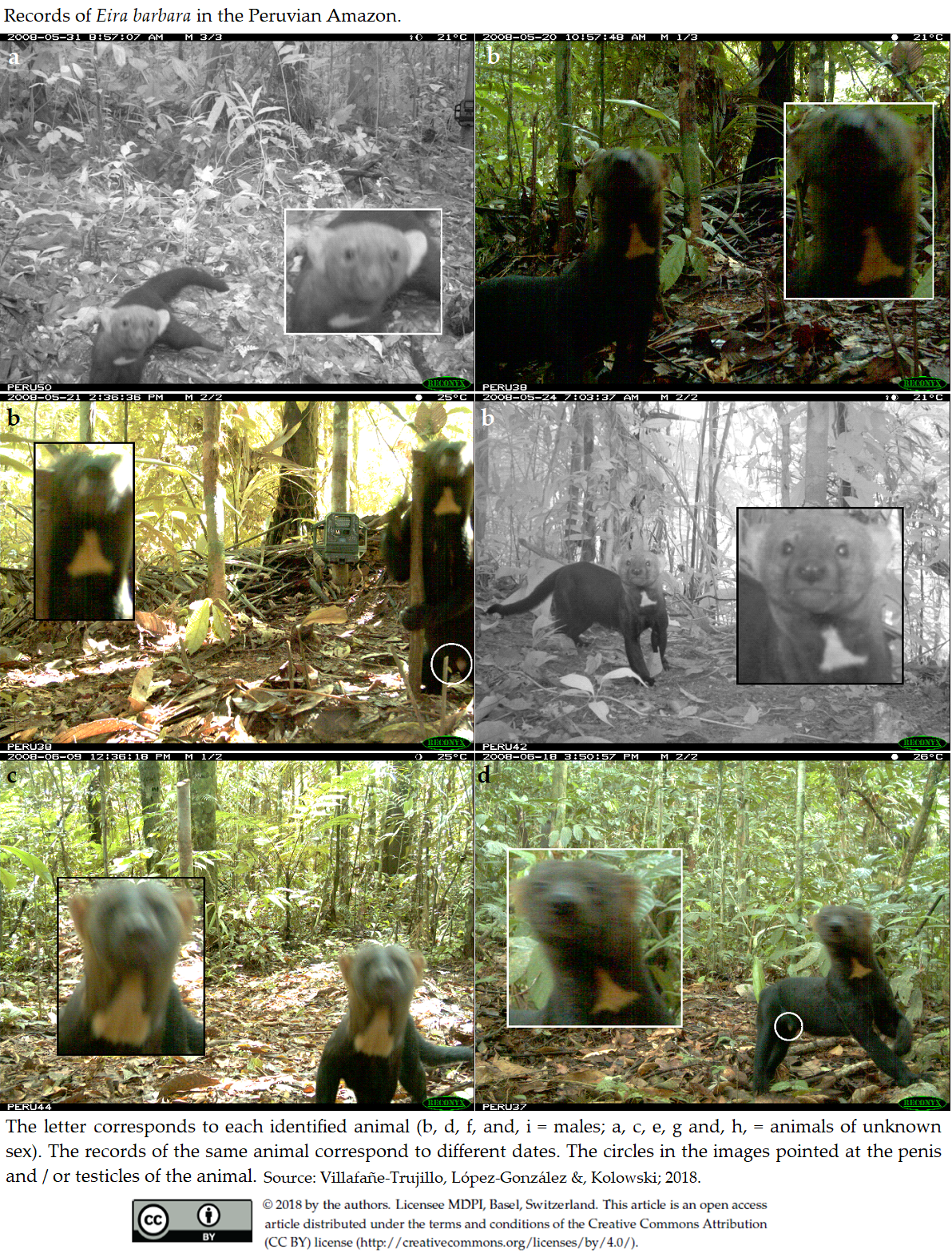
Records of E. barbara in the Peruvian Amazon 1 of 2

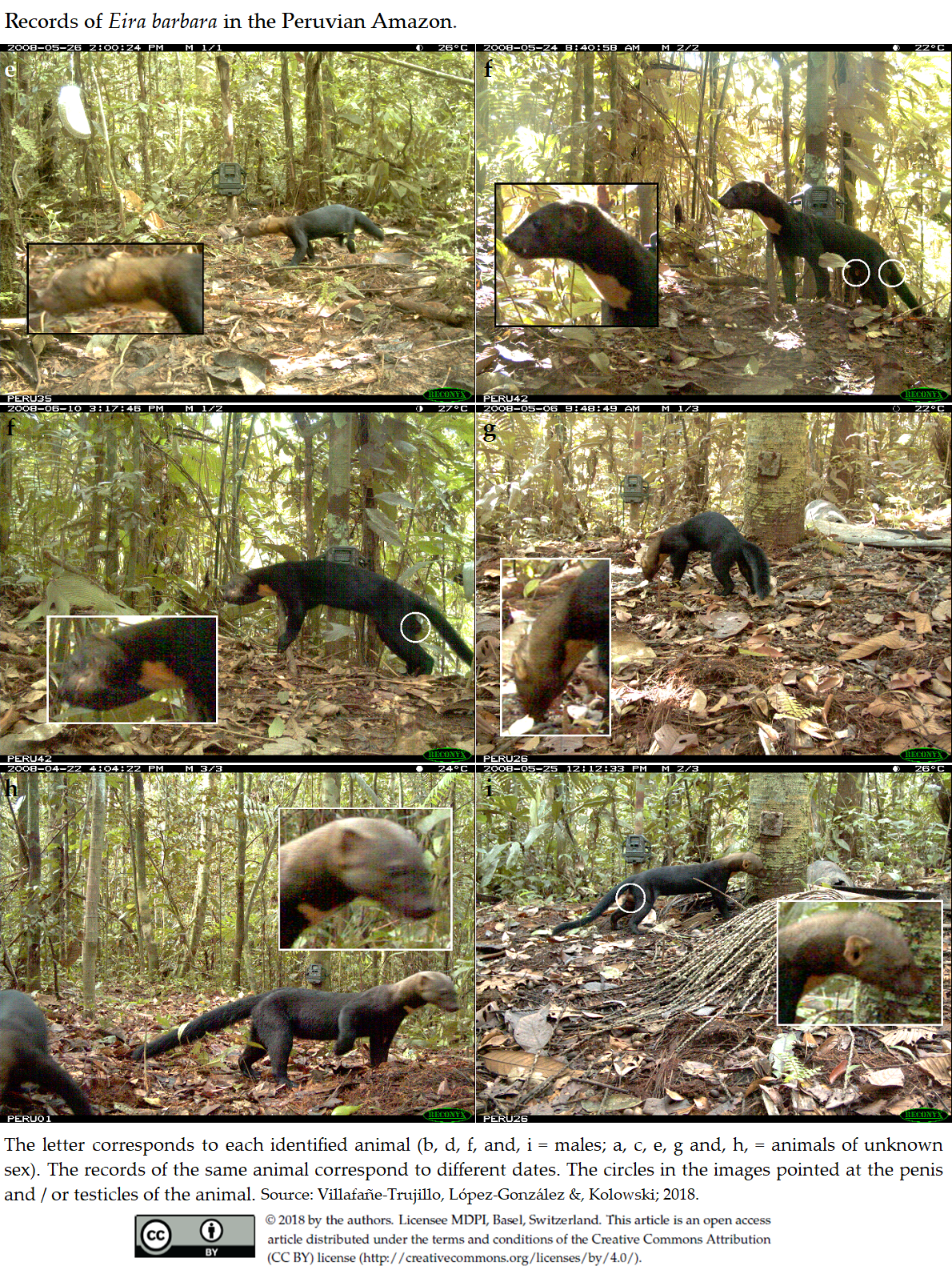
Records of E. barbara in the Peruvian Amazon 2 of 2

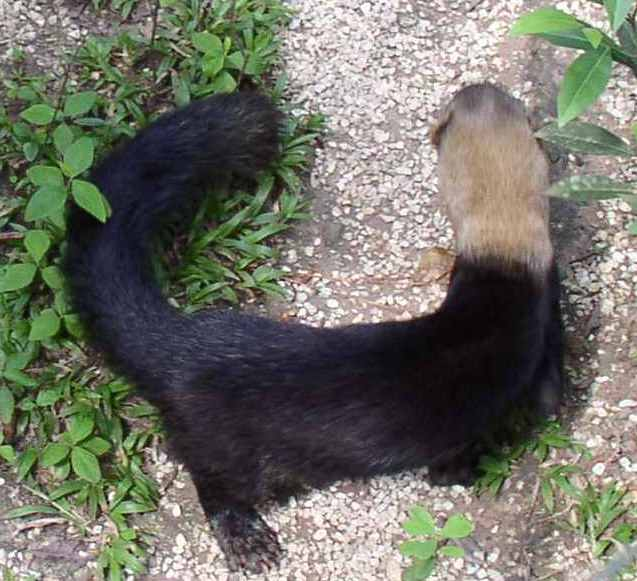
A tayra from above

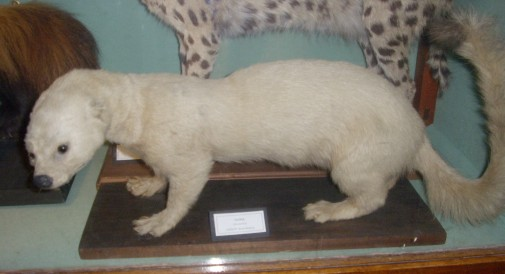
A rare white tayra at Ipswich Museum, Ipswich, Suffolk, England

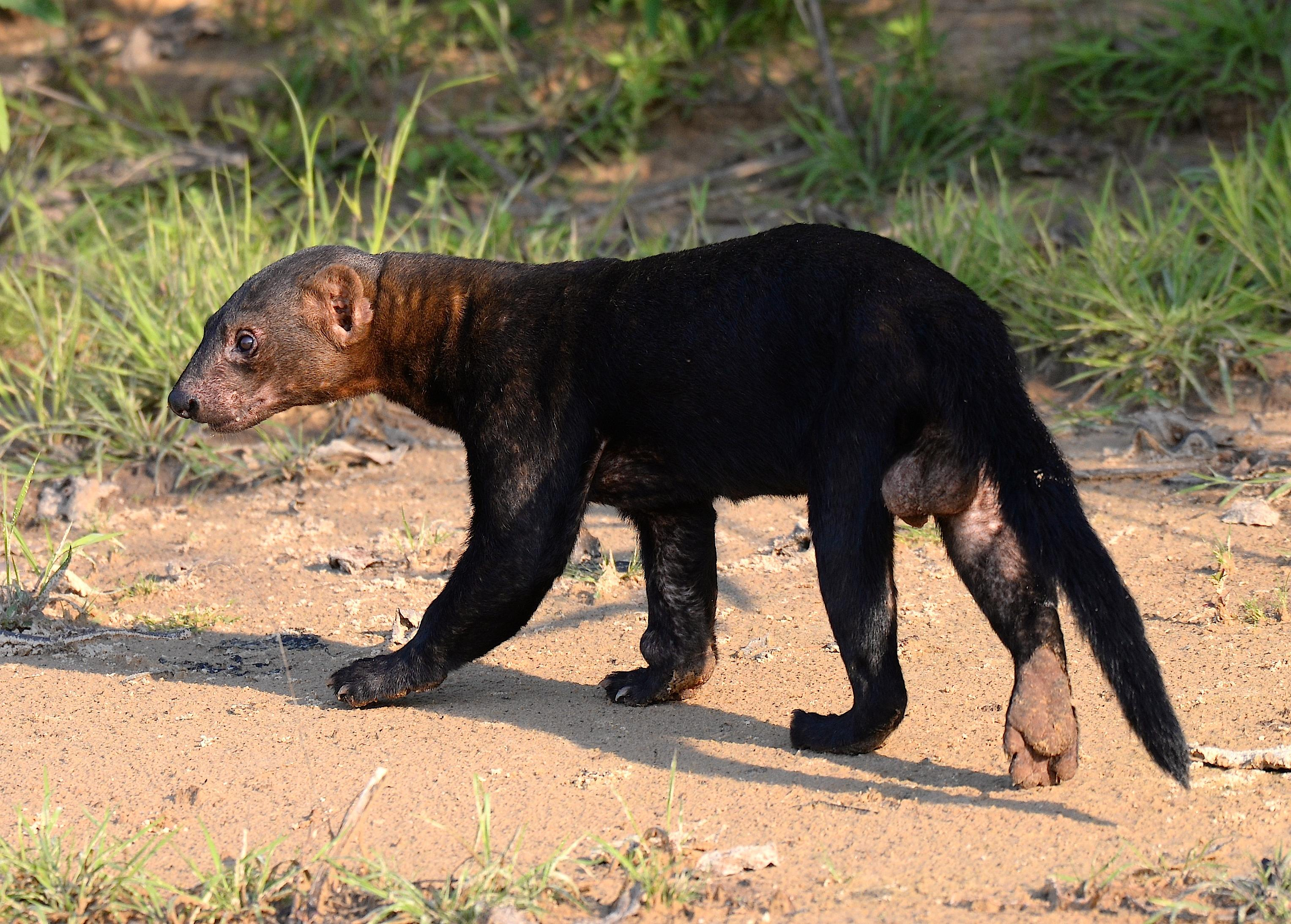
E. barbara male, Pantanal Brazil

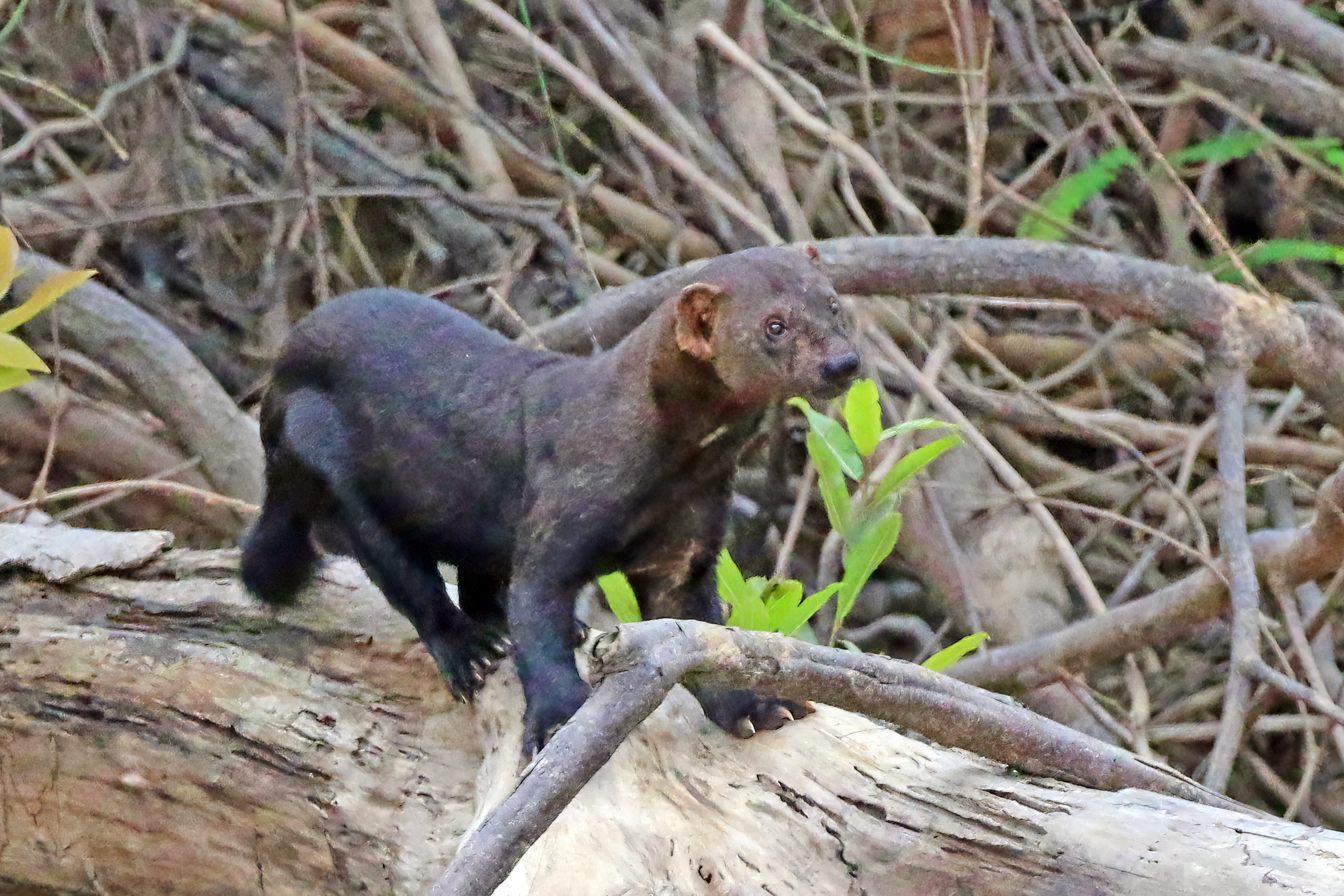
