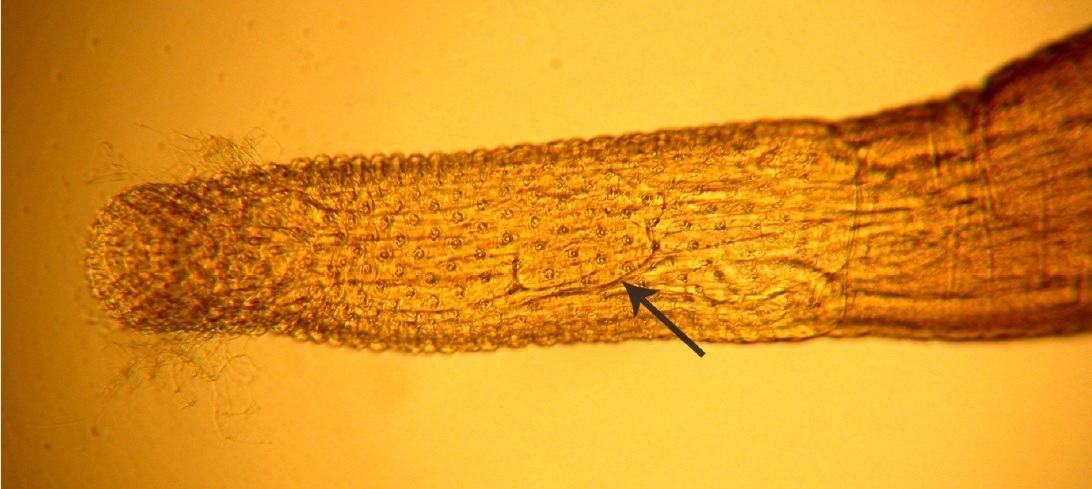
- The proboscis (a tubular organ for attachment to the host's intestinal wall) of a male Intraproboscis sanghae

Scientific classification
- Kingdom: Animalia
- Phylum: Acanthocephala
- Class: Archiacanthocephala
- Order: Gigantorhynchida
- Family: Gigantorhynchidae
- Genus: Intraproboscis; Amin, Heckmann, Sist, and Basso 2021
- Species: I. sanghae

Binomial name
- Intraproboscis sanghae Amin, Heckmann, Sist, and Basso 2021
- The type locality for I. sanghae is the Dzanga-Sangha Complex of Protected Areas in the extreme southwest part of the Central African Republic.

= Intraproboscis =

Genus of parasitic worms

Intraproboscis is a genus of Acanthocephala (thorny-headed or spiny-headed parasitic worms) containing a single known species, Intraproboscis sanghae. Found in central Africa, it infests the black-bellied pangolin and the tree pangolin, which are both threatened with extinction. The genus is described from several females and one incomplete male. Female worms reach up to 180 millimetres (7.1 in) long (mostly trunk) and 2 millimetres (0.079 in) wide; males seem to be smaller in all dimensions. (Note: Comparison is made based on a single incomplete male.) The body consists of a long, narrow trunk and a tubular proboscis covered with hooks, which is used for feeding and attachment. The proboscis has 34 to 36 rows of 6 to 7 hooks at the front and 15 to 17 spinelike hooks on the back that are used to pierce and hold the host's intestinal wall.

This genus closely resembles the genus Mediorhynchus but differs in having mammalian hosts instead of avian hosts, a simple proboscis receptacle that is completely suspended within the proboscis, and a complete lack of neck. The first discovery of a parareceptacle structure, a distinct sac-like structure adjacent to the proboscis receptacle, in the class Archiacanthocephala was from Intraproboscis and represents an important taxonomic and evolutionary bridge between different acanthocephalan groups.

The life cycle of I. sanghae remains unknown, but in common with other acanthocephalans, it likely involves a complex life cycle with at least two hosts. The intermediate host of Intraproboscis has not been definitively identified, but it is believed to be an arthropod, such as an insect. Within this host, the larvae develop into an infectious stage called a cystacanth. When a vertebrate consumes the intermediate host, the cystacanths enter the vertebrate’s intestines where they mature into adult worms and reproduce sexually, and it becomes the definitive host. The resulting eggs are expelled and hatch into new larvae. Infestation by I. sanghae can cause intestinal perforation and death in the black-bellied pangolin.

== Taxonomy ==
Intraproboscis is a genus of acanthocephalans (also called thorny-headed or spiny-headed parasitic worms) containing only the type species, I. sanghae. The genus Intraproboscis was circumscribed and species I. sanghae was formally described in 2021 by Amin, Heckmann, Sist, and Basso, from four female specimens extracted from a dead 5-year-old black-bellied pangolin (Phataginus tetradactyla). A second sample which included both females and a single incomplete male was obtained in 2022 from a tree pangolin (Phataginus tricuspis). The name Intraproboscis refers to the proboscis receptacle's unusual internal position; sanghae derives from the Sangha tribal region, a forest divided between the nations of the Central African Republic, Cameroon and the Republic of the Congo, where specimens were collected.

Six distinct morphological features support Intraproboscis's classification within Gigantorhynchidae and distinguish it from the similar genus Mediorhynchus. Intraproboscis is characterized by: infesting mammals instead of birds, a simple proboscis receptacle that is completely suspended within the proboscis, proboscis retractor muscles that pass through the proboscis receptacle and into the body cavity posteriorly, no neck, a parareceptacle structure (a distinct sac-like structure adjacent to the proboscis receptacle), and a uterine vesicle (a thick-walled, spheroidal compartment between the uterus and the uterine bell, replacing the uterine bell glands and encircled by ducts of unknown function); the last two of these are both absent in Mediorhynchus. As well as morphological differences, an 18S rDNA analysis further confirmed the status of Intraproboscis as a distinct genus forming a separate lineage from Mediorhynchus. The discovery of a parareceptacle structure in Archiacanthocephala is novel, representing an important taxonomic and evolutionary bridge between different acanthocephalan groups. Phylogenetic studies have been performed confirming its position in the order Gigantorhynchidae.

Archiacanthocephala

- Archiacanthocephala
  - - Oligacanthorhynchidae
      - Macracanthorhynchus ingens
      - Nephridiacanthus major
      - Oncicola sp.
    - Moniliformidae
      - Moniliformis moniliformis
    - Gigantorhynchidae
      - - Mediorhynchus gallinarum
        - Mediorhynchus africanus
      - Mediorhynchus grandis
    - Gigantorhynchidae
      - Intraproboscis sanghae

Cladogram for select taxa in the class Archiacanthocephala based on a 18S rRNA gene comparison from Rodríguez et al. (2022). Similar comparisons have been conducted by Gomes et al. (2019) and Amin et al. (2020).

== Description ==
Anatomical measurements of I. sanghae
Measurements	Female (mm)	Male (mm) (Note: Based on an incomplete male from a seized illegal shipment of tree pangolins from an unknown location in central Africa)
Length of proboscis	1.56–1.87	1.37
Width of proboscis	0.27–0.41 (anterior); 0.58–0.74 (posterior)	0.29 (anterior); 0.44 (posterior)
Length of proboscis receptacle	0.77–1.04	0.68
Width of proboscis receptacle	0.26–0.36	0.21
Length of trunk	63.75–180.00	94.25
Max width of trunk	1.12–2.00	1.5
Cephalic ganglion	166–229 x 60–100	208 x 94
Length of lemnisci	2.08–3.28	4.00
Width of lemnisci	0.22–0.38	0.42
Size of eggs	0.068–0.083 x 0.038–0.052	
Size of testes		2.90 x 0.60 (anterior); 1.32 x 0.55(posterior)
Anterior trunk to anterior testis		88.25

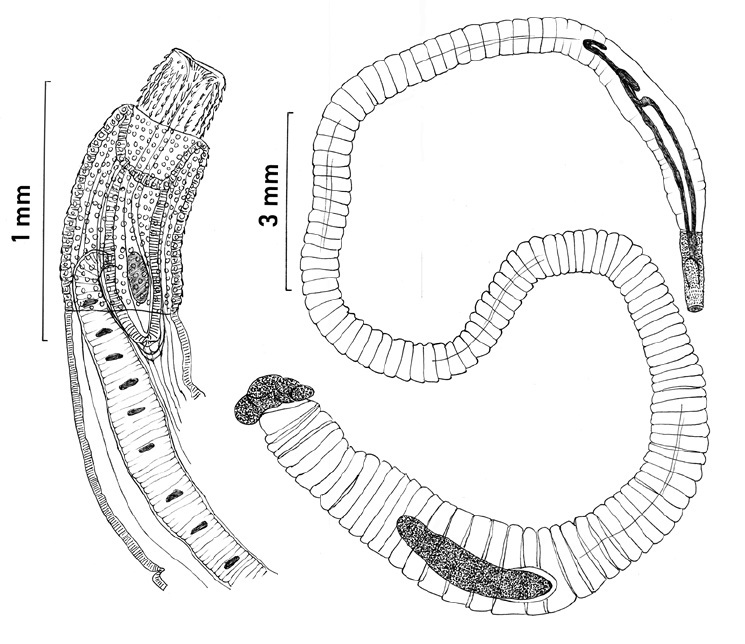
Left: Anterior region of a female I. sanghae showing the retracted anterior proboscis, posteriorly positioned proboscis receptacle, and insertion points for the lemniscus and receptacle; Right: Incomplete male I. sanghae displaying distinct pseudo-segmentation and an everted structure.

I. sanghae consists of a proboscis (a tubular organ for attachment to the host's intestinal wall), a proboscis receptacle (a complex structure for housing the proboscis when retracted), and a long and narrow trunk that lacks spines and shows noticeable pseudosegmentation (false divisions resembling segments). The original description is based on a sample of four pregnant female worms, and was supplemented with a second sample which included both females and a single incomplete male. The worms are up to 180 mm long, virtually all of which is the trunk, and 2 mm wide. There is pronounced sexual dimorphism with the female being larger in all measurements: the sampled male body is 94.25 mm long and 1.5 mm wide. The body wall of I. sanghae is much thicker on the dorsal side compared to the ventral side and contains many fragmented nuclei and a few large nuclei located at the front.

The proboscis has a truncated cone shape which is cylindrical at the front and conical at the back. The anterior proboscis has two sensory pores (small openings for detecting stimuli) at the tip and many hooks arranged in longitudinal rows. The posterior part also has hooks, with spines forming dome-shaped folds in the tegument (outer body covering). The roots of the hooks (anchor-like extensions) are about as long as the hook blades. Specifically, the proboscis is armed with 34 to 36 rows (32 in the male sample) of 6 to 7 tightly packed hooks anteriorly and 15–17 more widely spaced spinelike hooks posteriorly which are used to attach themselves to the intestines of the host. The hooks in the anterior proboscis increase in size as they go down the proboscis. At the apex in the female samples, they are 38–44 μm long by 9–11 μm wide whereas they are 40–50 μm long by 12–14 μm wide in the middle of the proboscis, and 47–54 μm long by 15–16 μm wide at base of the proboscis. The spinelike hooks in the posterior proboscis are more or less similar in size being 20–25 μm long by 5–7 μm wide. In the male sample, the anterior hooks are 33 μm long by 8 μm wide, the middle hooks are 37 μm long by 11 μm wide, and the posterior hooks are 42 μm long by 13 μm wide. The spinelike hooks in the posterior proboscis are 18 μm long by 4 μm wide.

The proboscis receptacle is simple in structure, entirely contained within the proboscis, and has a single layer that is thicker on the dorsal side. It is cylindrical but becomes narrower at the back and widens at the front, attaching at the division between the anterior and posterior portions of the proboscis. Retractor muscles (muscles used to pull the proboscis back) pass through its back end. A large, elliptical cerebral ganglion (a mass of nerve cells acting as a brain) is located near the rear of the receptacle. There is one parareceptacle structure (a secondary attachment structure that is 520–624 μm long) connecting the ventral body wall at the front and the receptacle at the back.

The organism has no neck. The lemnisci (bundles of sensory nerve fibers) are long, flat, and wide, located at the front of the body within the posterior proboscis, and contain 8 or 9 large nuclei.

The reproductive system is compact and well developed, with a round uterine vesicle (average size: 387 μm long by 322 μm wide) which stores and transports eggs. This vesicle has anterior and lateral lobes, is encircled by complex tubules of unknown function, and is connected to a large funnel-like uterine bell which directs the eggs. The glandular structures typically found in related species are missing, as is a terminal gonopore (external opening for reproductive discharge). The eggs are oval, with concentric shells (layered coverings); the outer shell is thinner at the poles and is always enclosed within a ligament sac (a protective sac) supported by prominent ligament strands.

== Distribution ==
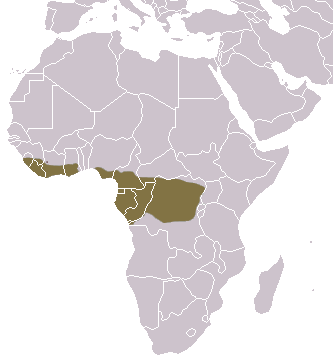
Left: Range of the black-bellied pangolin; Right: Range of the tree pangolin, hosts of I. sanghae

The distribution of I. sanghae is determined by that of its hosts, of which two are known. The black-bellied pangolin (Phataginus tetradactyla) is a vulnerable species which is at high risk of extinction in the wild. An infested specimen was found in the Dzanga-Sangha Complex of Protected Areas, the type locality, located in the extreme southwest part of the Central African Republic. This host is native to parts of western and central Africa, having been found as far west and north as Senegal, across the continent to the western border of Uganda, and south into the northern border of Angola. They are found in areas such as the Congo Basin and Guinean forests. There is a distinct gap in the populations with no record of individuals from southwest Ghana through to western Nigeria.

The tree pangolin (Phataginus tricuspis), which is an endangered species at high risk of extinction, is also a host. It is native to large portions of central Africa, as far west as Guinea-Bissau in west Africa, as far east as south-western Kenya and north-western Tanzania, and as far south as north-western Zambia and northern Angola.

== Hosts and pathology ==
Life cycle of Acanthocephala (Note: A 2001 survey of the literature found no known cases of human infection by I. sanghae.)

The specific life cycle of Intraproboscis is unknown, but the life cycle of acanthocephala (thorny-headed worms) in general unfolds in three distinct stages. It begins when an egg develops into an infective form known as an acanthor. This acanthor is released with the feces of its definitive host, typically a vertebrate, and must be ingested by an intermediate host, an arthropod such as an insect, to continue its development. Although the specific intermediate hosts for the genus Intraproboscis are unidentified, it is generally accepted that insects serve as the primary intermediaries as they make up the diet of the host.

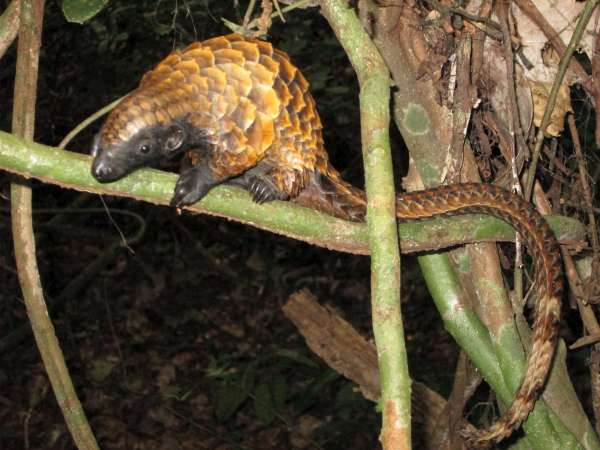
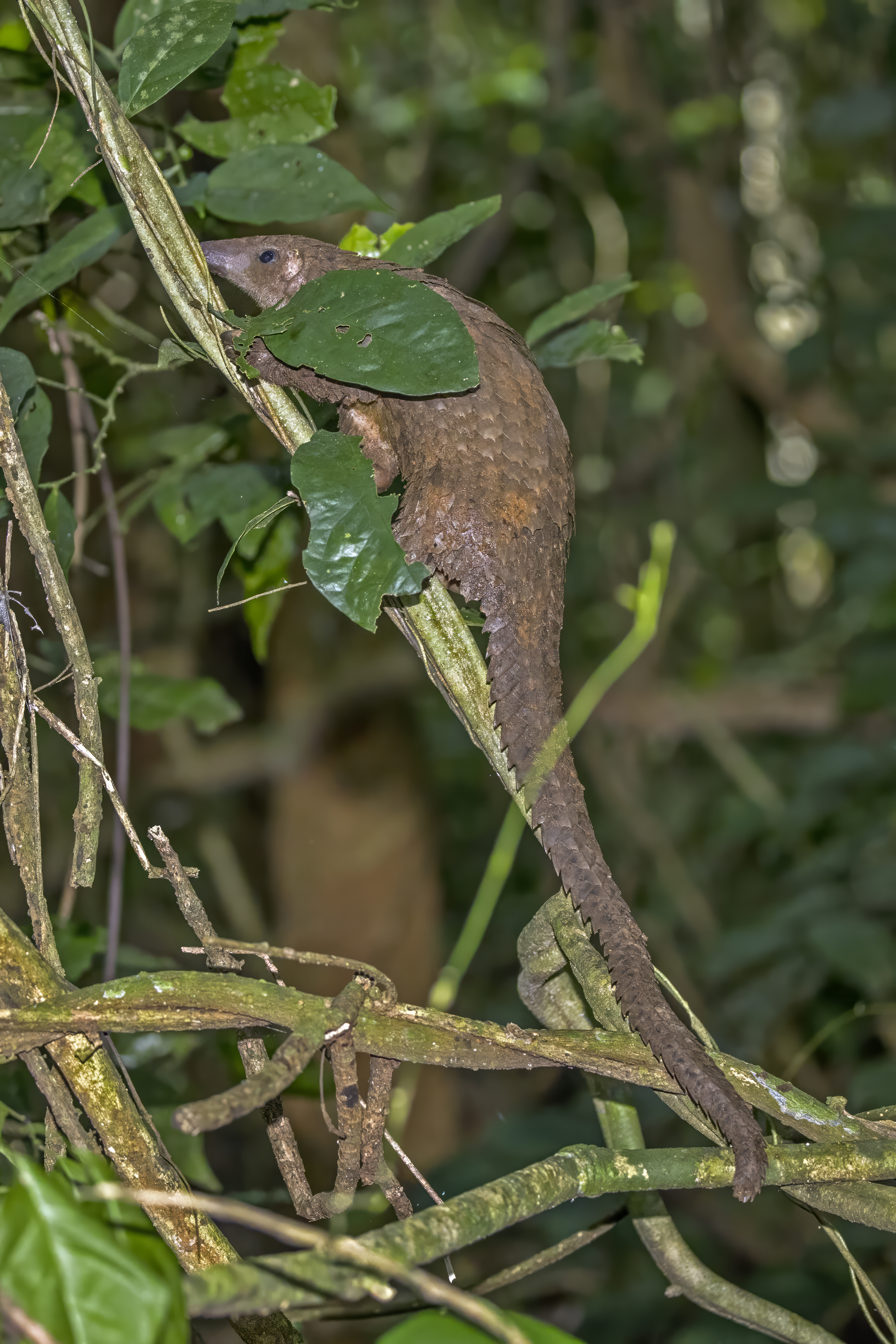
The black-bellied pangolin (left) is the definitive host of I. sanghae. The second host of I. sanghae discovered is the tree pangolin (right).

Inside the intermediate host, the acanthor molts its outer layer, becoming an acanthella (the immature larval stage). At this stage it burrows into the host's intestinal wall and continues to grow. The life cycle culminates in the formation of a cystacanth, a larval stage able to infect the definitive host while retaining juvenile features (differing from the adult only in size and stage of sexual development), which awaits ingestion by the definitive host to mature fully. Once inside the definitive host, these larvae attach themselves to the intestinal wall using the hooks on their proboscis, mature into sexually reproductive adults, and complete the cycle by releasing new acanthors into the host's feces.

I. sanghae is known to parasitize two species of pangolin: the black-bellied pangolin, the type host, and the tree pangolin. They have been found perforating the intestine, invading the body cavity, and causing secondary septic peritonitis (an infection of the peritoneum, the thin tissue lining the abdomen, that is caused by the parasite). The cause of death for the sampled host was intestinal perforation. A survey of the medical literature published in 2021 did not list I. sanghae as infecting humans.
