= Mediorhynchus mattei =

Scientific classification
- Domain: Eukaryota
- Kingdom: Animalia
- Phylum: Rotifera
- Class: Archiacanthocephala
- Order: Gigantorhynchida
- Family: Gigantorhynchidae
- Genus: Mediorhynchus
- Species: M. mattei

Binomial name
- Mediorhynchus mattei Marchand and Vassiliadès, 1982

Species of worm

Mediorhynchus mattei is a species of acanthocephalan, a parasitic worm, found in the digestive tract of a bird, the northern red-billed hornbill Tockus erythrorhynchus. Male worms are 2-3 cm in length, females are 3-11 cm in length. It was described in 1982; its name honours French zoologist Xavier Mattei.

== Hosts and localities ==
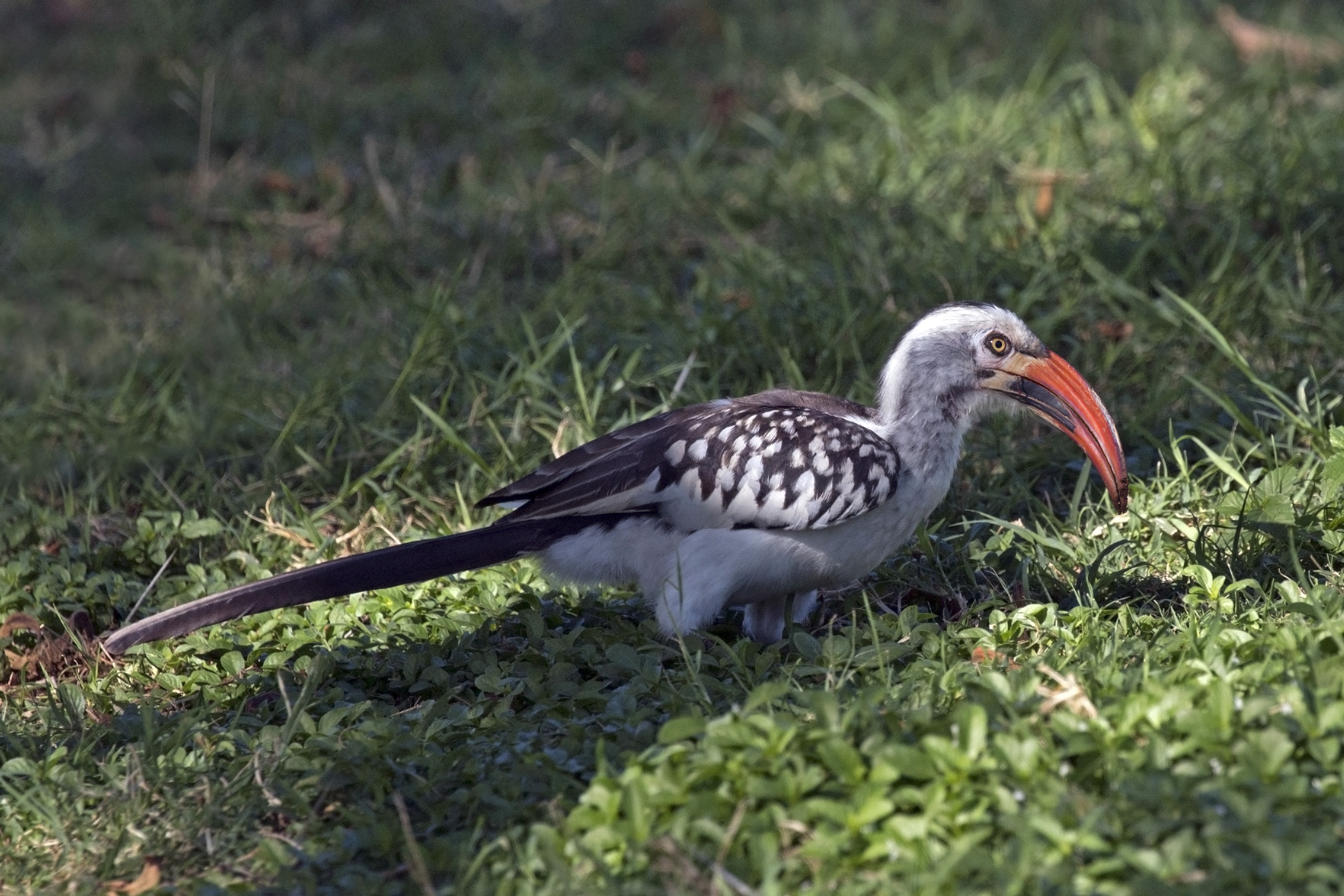
The northern red-billed hornbill Tockus erythrorhynchus is the type-host of Mediorhynchus mattei

The northern red-billed hornbill Tockus erythrorhynchus is the type-host of Mediorhynchus mattei. The parasite was described from specimens found in Senegal.
