= Mediorhynchus =

Scientific classification
- Kingdom: Animalia
- Phylum: Acanthocephala
- Class: Archiacanthocephala
- Order: Gigantorhynchida
- Family: Gigantorhynchidae
- Genus: Mediorhynchus; Van Cleave, 1916

Genus of worms

Mediorhynchus is a genus of small parasitic spiny-headed (or thorny-headed) worms. Phylogenetic analysis has been conducted on two known species of Mediorhynchus and confirmed the placement along with the related genus Gigantorhynchus in the family Gigantorhynchida. The distinguishing features of this order among archiacanthocephalans is a divided proboscis (specifically, the presence of a "teloboscis" which is the posterior third of a proboscis). This genus contains fifty-eight species that are distributed globally. These worms exclusively parasitize birds by attaching themselves around the cloaca using their hook-covered proboscis. The bird hosts are of different orders.

== Taxonomy ==
Mediorhynchus is monophyletic based on phylogenetic analysis.

Archiacanthocephala

- Archiacanthocephala
  - Oligacanthorhynchidae
    - Macracanthorhynchus ingens
    - Oncicola venezuelensis
    - Oligacanthorhynchus tortuosa
    - Nephridiacanthus major
  - - Moniliformidae
      Moniliformis moniliformis
    - Gigantorhynchida
      - Mediorhynchus sp.
      - Gigantorhynchus echinodiscus

Phylogenetic reconstruction for select species in the class Archiacanthocephala

== Description ==
Species can be identified primarily morphologically by the arrangement of hooks of the proboscis. The presence of a divided proboscis (specifically, the presence of a "teloboscis" which is the posterior third of a proboscis) is an autapomorphy of Mediorhynchus. Males in some species possess eight cement glands which are used to temporarily close the posterior end of the female after copulation.

== Species ==
There are 59 species in the genus Mediorhynchus.

Name (Note: A binomial authority in parentheses indicates that the species was originally described in a genus other than Mediorhynchus.)	Taxonomy	Host(s) and range	Diagnostic features
Mediorhynchus africanus Amin, Evans, Heckmann and El-Naggar, 2013	The species name africanus is named for the worm's distribution across sub-Saharan Africa. It is synonymous with Empodius segmentatus (de Marval, 1902) Southwell et MacFie, 1925 and Mediorhynchus selengensis Harris 1973. One mitochondrial and one nuclear gene sequence confirmed that M. africanus and M. gallinarum are allopatric sister species with 9.7% genetic sequence divergence.	The Helmeted guineafowl is one of the hosts of M. africanus Distribution map of the Helmeted guineafowl. The blue is the resident area, the right brown is the introduced areas, and the dark brown is the possibly extinct and reintroduced area. The Yellow-necked spurfowl is another host of M. africanus Distribution map of the Yellow-necked spurfowl M. africanus has been found parasitizing the helmeted guinea fowl (Numida meleagris) in Kruger National Park, South Africa, Morocco, Nigeria (reported as Numida ptilorhyncha) and Burkina Faso. The Yellow-necked spurfowl (Pternistis leucoscepus) in Kenya.	A dorsoventrally flattened, pseudo-segmented trunk bears numerous sensory pits. The proboscis is covered in 18–22 longitudinal rows of 4–6 hooks, and terminates in two conspicuous apical pores. In females, the posterior extremity is expanded and forms a dorsal, dome-shaped terminal projection situated opposite the subterminal gonopore. The eggs are comparatively large. The trunk is pseudosegmented, flattened laterally, has many prevalent sensory pits, and measures 3.0 to 74.0 mm long by 0.5 to 2.80 mm wide in the male and measures between 4.00 and 110.00 mm long by 0.60 and 4.00 mm wide in the much larger female. There are up to 100 annuli (structures that permits shortening and lengthening of the body by telescoping) in females but fewer in the shorter males. The proboscis is divided by a prominent ridge into two parts: anterior and posterior. The anterior proboscis is pear or apple-shaped with a truncated bare apical end measuring 250 to 339 long by 278 to 478 wide in the male and 300 to 438 long by 330 to 510 wide in the female. The anterior proboscis has two prominent apical pores and 18 to 22 longitudinal rows of 4 to 6 hooks each. The hooks posteriorly directed and measure between 35 and 76 long with the smallest found anteriorly and the longest in the middle. The posterior proboscis is conically shaped and measures 291 to 332 long by 591 to 689 wide at junction with anterior trunk in the male, and 323 to 365 long by 99 to 745 wide at junction with anterior trunk in the female. Except for the posterior most end, the posterior proboscis is covered in very thin spines that are curved posteriorly or undulating with a total of 26 to 40 longitudinal rows of 2 to 6 spines each measuring 14 to 43 long with the longest spines found anteriorly. The Proboscis receptacle is single-walled with anterior portion encased in jacket of adjacent retractor fibers and measures 0.64 to 1.23 mm long by 0.11 to 0.44 mm wide in the male and 0.64 to 1.80 mm long by 0.11 to 0.55 mm wide in the female. The proboscis retractor muscles are prominent and attached to the proboscis receptacle near its posterior end dorsally. The lemnisci long, digitiform, unequal, and unattached. The shorter lemniscus measure between 1.60 and 3.38 mm long by 0.21 and 0.31 mm wide, with 5 or 6 giant nuclei in the male and measure 1.60 to 5.50 mm long by 0.19 to 0.33 mm wide, with 5 or 6 giant nuclei in the female. Longer lemniscus measures 2.15 to 3.47 mm long by 0.21 to 0.33 mm wide with 6, occasionally 7, giant nuclei in the male and measures 2.12 to 7.31 mm long by 0.19 to 0.62 mm wide with 6 giant nuclei in the female. The male reproductive system is located in the posterior third of trunk and consists of two oblong testes measuring Anterior testis measure 0.37 to 4.10 mm long by 0.30 to 1.10 mm wide and the posterior testis measure 0.32 to 3.15 mm wide. There are eight clustered cement glands larger anteriorly, each with one large central giant nucleus and with independent cement ducts emptying at posterior end of Saefftigen’s pouch, along with prominent common sperm duct. The male gonopore is terminal. The female reproductive system is short and located in the broad and flat posterior end of trunk. The uterine bell contains many large nucleated cells with its dorsal and ventral anterior ends connected to body wall with filaments. The gonopore is sub-ventral occasionally covered by a looping posterior trunk expansion. The eggs are ovoid being 65 to 86 long by 39 to 52 wide.
Mediorhynchus alecturae (Johnston and Edmonds, 1947)	Mediorhynchus alecturae was originally named Empodius alecturae by Johnston and Edmonds in 1947 and renamed by Golvan in 1962. It is considreded a junior synonym of M papillosus. The specific epithet derives from Alectura, the genus of the Australian brushturkey, which serves as the host for this species.	The Australian brushturkey is a host of M. alecturae Distribution map of the Australian brushturky. M. alecturae is known to parasitize only the Australian brushturkey (Alectura lathami) and samples were collected from Queensland, Australia. The type locality is the Eidsvold	
Mediorhynchus cambellensis Soota, Srivastava and Ghosh, 1969	The species name, cambellensis was named after the location the hosts were caught, Campbell Bay.	M. cambellensis has been found infesting the intestine of an oriole and flycatcher on Great Nicobar Island.	This worm closely resembles M. armenicum but differs from it in number of proboscis hooks and extent of lemnisci. The male is 9.13 mm long and 1.2 mm wide whereas the female is larger measuring 13 to 16 mm long and 2 mm wide. The proboscis is short and club shaped and 0.83 mm long in the male and 1.0 mm long in the female. The distal portion of the proboscis is truncated, the proximal portion is conical, and the proboscis receptacle 0.66 mm long. The proboscis hooks are anterior and in seven spiral rows each of 7–9 large hooks, posterior hooks are very numerous and small. The lemnisci are almost equal, measuring 3.15 by 0.25 mm. The testes are almost equal and measure 1.2 by 0.44 mm and the eggs measure 0.055 by 0.033 mm. There are four pairs of cement glands that are difficult to distinguish.
Mediorhynchus centurorum Nickol, 1969			M. centurorum was found in the egg and larval forms in Pennsylvania wood cockroach (Parcoblatta pensylvanica). In the laboratory setting, these worms were found to infect red-bellied woodpeckers (Melanerpes carolinus), red-headed woodpeckers (Melanerpes erythrocephalus), Northern flicker, (Colaptes auratus); and a hairy woodpecker, (Dendrocopos villosus) with a mean prepatent period of 35 days. Cystacanths fed to starlings (Sturnus vaulgaris), and red-winged blackbirds, Agelaius phoeniceus, did not produce infections. The eggs have 4 membranes, are 55 um long and have an elongation ratio of 1.53.
Mediorhynchus channapettae George and Nadakal, 1984		M. channapettae has been found birds of Kerala, India.	
Mediorhynchus cisticolae Smales, 2011	The species name cisticolae is named after the host genus Cisticola.	The Red-faced cisticola is a host of M. cisticolae	M. cisticolae has been found infesting the Red-faced cisticola (Cisticola erythrops) which is the type host, in the Cote D'Ivoire.
Mediorhynchus colluricinclae Smales, 2002		M. colluricinclae has been found parasitizing pomatostomatids in South Australian.	The eggs are 51.5 um long and have an elongation ratio of 1.34.
Mediorhynchus conirostris Ward, 1966		M. conirostris parasitizes rodents in Egypt.	M. conirostris has a proboscis which contains 16 to 20 longitudinal rows of four to five hooks.
Mediorhynchus corcoracis Johnston and Edmonds, 1950	White-winged chough (Corcorax melanorhamphos); The little crow (Corvus bennetti); The Australian raven (Corvus coronoides); The little raven (Corvus mellori); Australian magpie lark (Grallina cyanolenca)	New South Wales, Queensland, Victoria, and South Australia; South Australia; South Australia; Victoria and South Australia south Australia and the northern territory	It is named after the genus name of a host species Corcorax.M. corcoracis was found parasitising the white-winged chough (Corcorax melanorhamphos) in New South Wales, Queensland, Victoria, and South Australia, Australia. It is named after the genus name of the host species Corcorax. It is also found in several species of crow including the little crow Corvus bennetti from, the Australian raven Corvus coronoides, and the little raven Corvus mellori all from South Australia. It has also been found in the Australian Magpie-lark (Grallina cyanoleuca).
Mediorhynchus edmondsi Schmidt and Kuntz, 1977			
Mediorhynchus emberizae (Rudolphi, 1819) (Note: M. emberizae was originally named Echinorhynchus emberizae by Karl Asmund Rudolphi in 1819 but was renamed.)		M. emberizae is found infesting the intestines of the red-cowled cardinal (Paroaria dominicana) in the State of Bahia, Brazil.	
Mediorhynchus empodius (Skrjabin, 1913)			
Mediorhynchus fatimaae Khan, Bilqees and Muti-ur-Rehman, 2004		The White-eyed buzzard is a host of M. fatimaae	M. fatimaae has been found parasitizing the White-eyed buzzard (Burastur teesa) in Karachi, Pakistan. It is distinguished mainly by a unique proboscis armature of 10–12 longitudinal rows having 7–8 hooks and 10 longitudinal rows having 7–8 spines and eggs measuring 0.041–0.045 mm by 0.015–0.018 mm.
Mediorhynchus gallinarum (Bhalerao, 1937)			M. gallinarum was found infecting chickens (Gallus gallus) in India, other Asian countries, and Africa. M. gallinarum is similar to M. africanus however specimens from Indonesia and elsewhere are cylindrical and non-segmented, the proboscis has 18 to 22 longitudinal rows of four to five hooks and lacks prominent apical pores, sensory pits are rare on the trunk, the posterior end of the female is pointed with a terminal gonopore, and the eggs are smaller.
Mediorhynchus gibsoni Bilqees, Khan, Khatoon and Khatoon, 2007			M. gibsoni was found infesting the White-eyed buzzard (Butastur teesa) in Karachi, Sindh, Pakistan. The worm has a long pseudosegmented body with a short neck. The proboscis is long with a sac-like receptacle and possesses 25 circular longitudinal rows of between 8 and 12 hooks at the anterior region, and 10 rows of 8 to 16 spines at the posterior region. The two testes are oval and there are eight cement glands.
Mediorhynchus giganteus Meyer, 1931			M. giganteus has been found parasitizing the domestic turkey (Meleagris gallopavo) in East Africa. The proboscis has about 14 longitudinal rows of five hooks with a maximum body length of 11 cm found in a female.
Mediorhynchus grandis Van Cleave, 1916			M. grandis has been found in the small intestine of the Common grackle (Quiscalus quiscula) in Maryland, New Jersey, Kansas, Illinois, Kentucky, the American crow (Corvus brachyrhynchos) in Maryland and Ohio, Eastern meadowlark (Sturnella magna) in North Carolina, Ohio, Illinois, Oklahoma, and Texas, Red-winged blackbird (Agelaius phoeniceus)) in Ohio and Texas, Rusty blackbird (Euphagus carolinus) in Illinois, Brown-headed cowbird (Molothrus ater) in Texas, the Saltmarsh sparrow (Ammospiza caudacutus) or a Nelson's sparrow (Ammospiza nelsoni) (Note: Reported as a sharp-tailed sparrow Passerherbulus caudacutus which has been determined to be two species.) in Texas and the American robin (Turdus migratorius) in Ohio. Females are 27 to 51 mm long and 0.8 to 1.44 wide, whereas the males are smaller being 7 to 12 mm long and 0.6 to 0.8 mm wide. The proboscis is cone-shaped and 0.57 to 0.86 mm long and is divided into anterior and posterior portions. The anterior portion of the proboscis has 18 longitudinal rows of hooks each with 4 to 5 hooks (averaging a total of 76 hooks), and each hook having posteriorly directed roots. The posterior region of the proboscis has around 30 longitudinal rows of small hooks each with 4 to 6 hooks (averaging a total of 130).There are five to eight pyriform cement glands. Testes are oval (0.98 to 1.03 mm by 0.26 to 0.35 mm). Leminsci are filiform and have 6 nuclei each. The worms have been found in the intermediate host, grasshoppers. The eggs have 4 membranes, are 47.5 um long and have an elongation ratio of 1.86.
Mediorhynchus indicus Varghese-George, Mathai-Nadakal, Kunjanpillai-Vijayakumaran and Rajendran, 1981			
Mediorhynchus kuntzi Ward, 1960			M. kuntzi has been found parasitizing curlews (Numenius) in Egypt. The proboscis has 24 rows of five to six hooks.
Mediorhynchus lagodekhiensis Kuraschvili, 1955			
M. Mediorhynchus lanius	It is named after the genus name of the host species Lanius	M. Mediorhynchus lanius has been found infesting the Long-tailed shrike (Lanius schach) in the Quang Ninh Province, Vietnam.	
Mediorhynchus leptis Ward, 1966			M. leptis has been found parasitizing the Common kestrel (Falco tinnunculus) in Egypt. The proboscis has 22 longitudinal rows of five to six hooks.
Mediorhynchus lophurae Wang, 1966			M. lophurae is a parasite of the Silver pheasant (Lophura nycthemera) and is found in Lang Son, Vietnam.
Mediorhynchus mariae George and Nadakal, 1984			
Mediorhynchus mattei Marchand and Vassiliades, 1982		The northern red-billed hornbill is the type-host of M. mattei	M. mattei has been found in the digestive tract of the Northern red-billed hornbill (Tockus erythrorhynchus) which is the type-host in Senegal. Male worms are 2–3 cm in length, females are 3–11 cm in length. It was described in 1982; its name honours French zoologist Xavier Mattei who collected the birds containing this acantocephalan used to identify the species.
Mediorhynchus meiringi Bisseru, 1960			
Mediorhynchus micracanthus (Rudolphi, 1819)			M. micranthus was found infesting the Eurasian skylark (Alauda arvensis) and the Crested lark (Galerida cristata) in the Golestan Province of Iran.
Mediorhynchus mirabilis (de Marval, 1905)			
Mediorhynchus mokgalongi Smales, Halajian, Luus-Powell, and Tavakol, 2018		The proboscis of M. mokgalongi has between 125 and 156 hooks arranged in 24 to 26 longitudinal rows of 24 to 26 hooks followed by 30 rows of 5 to 6 spines. It was found infesting a Karoo Thrush bird (Turdus smithi) in Polokwane, Limpopo Province. South Africa. The parasite was named after Mahlo Mokgalong for his contribution to the field of bird parasitology.	
Mediorhynchus murtensis Lundström, 1942			
Mediorhynchus nickoli Khan, Bilqees and Muti-ur-Rehman, 2004		The Black kite is a host of M. nickoli	M. nickoli has been found parasitizing the Black kite (Milvus migrans) in Karachi, Pakistan. It is distinguished mainly by a unique proboscis armature of 10 longitudinal rows having 7–8 hooks and six longitudinal rows having 6–8 spines and eggs measuring 0.046–0.051 mm by 0.0076–0.015 mm.
Mediorhynchus numidae (Baer, 1925)			M. numidae was found infesting the helmeted guinea fowl (Numida meliagris) in Pretoria, Gauteng Province, South Africa. Meyer renamed this species in 1932 from Heteroplus numidae. The proboscis has twelve longitudinal rows of three hooks.
Mediorhynchus orientalis Belopolskaya, 1953		In an aviary setting, M. orientalis was found infesting the purple starling (Lamprotornis purpureus), Rüppell's starling (Lamprotornis purpuroptera), and the Bali myna (Leucopsar rothschildi) with the intermediate hosts being the Surinam cockroach (Pycnoscelus surinamensis) and the American cockroach (Periplaneta americana). The eggs are 53 um long and have an elongation ratio of 2.12.	
Mediorhynchus oswaldocruzi Travassos, 1923			
Mediorhynchus otidis (Miescher, 1841)			
Mediorhynchus pandei Bhattacharya, 2007			
Mediorhynchus papillosus Van Cleave, 1916			M papillosus was found infesting the rufous-collared sparrows, (Zonotrichia capensis) in northern and central Chile. The eggs are 42.5 um long and have an elongation ratio of 2.02. It is the type species of the genus. M. bakeri but was found to be a junior synonym was found infesting the small intestines of the Northern bobwhite (Colinus virginianus) in Leon County, Florida.
Mediorhynchus passerus Das, 1951			
Mediorhynchus pauciuncinatus Dollfus, 1959			
Mediorhynchus peckeri Bhattacharya, 1999			
Mediorhynchus peruensis Moya, Martinez and Tantalean, 2011			M. peruensis was found infesting the Chiguanco thrush (Turdus chiguanco) in Peru.
Mediorhynchus petrochenkoi Gvosdev and Soboleva, 1966			
Mediorhynchus pintoi Travassos, 1923	It is likely named after Cesar Pinto, a contemporary Brazilian parasitologist.	The Spotted nothura is a host of M. pintoi Distribution map of the Spotted nothura. M. pintoi was found infesting the Spotted nothura (Nothura maculosa) from Minas Gerais, Brazil.	The original description by Travassos was made off of a damaged female specimen, and no new samples have been described as of the most recent survey in 2006.
Mediorhynchus quilonensis Bhattacharya, 2007			
Mediorhynchus rajasthanensis Gupta, 1976			
Mediorhynchus robustus Van Cleave, 1916		The Yellow-breasted chat is a host of M. robustus	M. robustus was found infesting the intestines of a Yellow-breasted chat (Icteria virens) in Washington, United States and the Long-tailed Meadowlark (Sturnella loyca) in the Biobío Region, Chile. The largest hooks are 38 microns. The intermediate hosts for this worm are unknown. M. Robustus has been found in larval cystacanth form the Raccoon dog (Nyctereutes procyonoides) in Japan, but this is likely a dead end host since all known final hosts for this species are Passeriformes. The eggs are 38 um long and have an elongation ratio of 2.38.
Mediorhynchus rodensis Cosin, 1971		The Eurasian jay is one of the hosts of M. rodensis	M. rodensis was found in the small intestine of the Eurasian jay (Garrulus glandarius) in Lakatnik in the Vrachanska Planina mountains of Bulgaria.
Mediorhynchus sipocotensis Tubangui, 1935			M. sipocotensis was found parasitizing the American robin (Turdus migratorius) in Marion County, Indiana. The worms possess a globular proboscis armed with concentric spines and a sac-like body with no spines on the trunk. They also have large unfragmented epidermal nuclei. The females possess two ligament sacs, and the males possess eight cement glands.
Mediorhynchus spinaepaucitas Smales, 2011		The Yellow-throated longclaw is a host of M. spinaepaucitas	M. spinaepaucitas has been found infesting the Yellow-throated longclaw (Macronyx croceus) in the Cote D'Ivoire.
Mediorhynchus taeniatus (von Linstow, 1901)		The African pied hornbill is a host of M. taeniatus The Southern Yellow-billed Hornbill is a host of M. taeniatus	M. taeniatus has been found infesting the African pied hornbill (Tockus fasciatus) in the Cote D'Ivoire. It has also been found infesting the helmeted guinea fowl (Numida meliagris) in Kimberley, Northern Cape Province, South Africa and the Southern Yellow-billed Hornbill (Tockus leucomelas) in Limpopo Province, South Africa. It was renamed from Echinorhynchus taeniatus to its present name by Dollfus in 1936.
Mediorhynchus tanagrae (Rudolphi, 1819)			
Mediorhynchus tenuis Meyer, 1931		The Common rock thrush is one of the hosts of M. tenuis	M. tenuis was found in the small intestine of the Common rock thrush (Monticola saxatilis) in the Iskarskoto defile in the Vrachanska Planina mountains of Bulgaria. It is also found in passeriforms in North Africa. The proboscis has 24 longitudinal rows of four to five hooks.
Mediorhynchus textori Barus, Six and Majumdar, 1978			M. textori is a parasite of the Village weaver (Ploceus cucullatus reported as the synonym Textor cucullatus) in Ghana. The proboscis has 10 to 11 longitudinal rows of nine to ten hooks. The eggs are 62.5 um long and have an elongation ratio of 1.54.
Mediorhynchus thrushi Bhattacharya, 2000			
Mediorhynchus turdi Smales, 2011	The species name turdi derives from the genus name of the type host Turdus.	M. turdi has been found infesting the African thrush (Turdus pelios) in the Cote D'Ivoire.	
Mediorhynchus turnixena (Tubangui, 1931) (Note: The species was originally named Empodius turnixena before obtaining its current name.)		M. turnixena was found infesting the Spotted buttonquail (Turnix ocellata) in the Philippines.	
Mediorhynchus vaginatus (Diesing, 1851) (Note: The species was originally named Echinorhynchus vaginatus and was later renamed Empodius vaginatus by Travassos in 1917 before obtaining its current name.)		M. vaginatus was found infesting the Green aracari (Pteroglossus viridis), the Channel-billed toucan (Ramphastos vitellinus reported as Rhamphastus culminatus), a Cock-of-the-rock (reported as Rupicola crocea) and the bobolink (Dolichonyx oryzivorus).	
Mediorhynchus vancleavei (Lundström, 1942)	The species was originally named Heteracanthothynchus vancleave. The species name vancleavei is derived from the named of American parasitologist Harley Jones Van Cleave who originally named the genus Mediorhynchus.	M. vancleavei is a parasite of birds in Sweden including the Common sandpiper (Actitis hypoleucos reported as Tringa hypoleucos).	
Mediorhynchus wardi Schmidt and Canaris, 1967	The species was named in honor of American parasitologist Helen L. Ward for her extensive contributions to the study of Acanthocephala.	M. wardi is a parasite of passeriforms in Kenya.	The proboscis has 24 to 26 longitudinal rows of six to eight hooks. The eggs are 52 um long and have an elongation ratio of 1.68.
Mediorhynchus zosteropis (Porta, 1913) (Note: M. zosteropis was originally named Centrorhynchus zosteropis by Porta in 1913 but was renamed.)	The Hooded crow is one of the hosts of M. zosteropis	Vratsa in the Vrachanska Planina mountains of Bulgaria and generally distributed in New Caledonia and the Palaearctic.	M. zosteropis was found in the small intestine of the Hooded crow (Corvus cornix) in the Vratsa in the Vrachanska Planina mountains of Bulgaria and generally distributed in New Caledonia and the Palaearctic. It is also reported in the Muscicapidae Diaphanopterus naevius similimus and the silvereye (Zosterops lateralis) in New Caledonia.

== Hosts and pathology ==
Life cycle of Acanthocephala (Note: A 2001 survey of the literature found no known cases of human infection by Mediorhynchus .)

The life cycle of acanthocephala (thorny-headed worms) in general unfolds in three distinct stages. It begins when an egg develops into an infective form known as an acanthor. This acanthor is released with the feces of its definitive host, typically a vertebrate, and must be ingested by an intermediate host, an arthropod such as an insect, to continue its development. Although the specific intermediate hosts for the genus Mediorhynchus are unidentified, it is generally accepted that insects serve as the primary intermediaries as they make up the diet of the host.

Inside the intermediate host, the acanthor molts its outer layer, becoming an acanthella (the immature larval stage). At this stage it burrows into the host's intestinal wall and continues to grow. The life cycle culminates in the formation of a cystacanth, a larval stage able to infect the definitive host while retaining juvenile features (differing from the adult only in size and stage of sexual development), which awaits ingestion by the definitive host to mature fully. Once inside the definitive host, these larvae attach themselves to the intestinal wall using the hooks on their proboscis, mature into sexually reproductive adults, and complete the cycle by releasing new acanthors into the host's feces.

Mediorhynchus species exclusively parasitize avian hosts. A survey of the medical literature published in 2021 did not list Mediorhynchus as infecting humans.
