= University of Corsica Pasquale Paoli =

University based in Corsica

Coordinates: 42°17′57″N 9°9′12″E

- Università di Corsica Pasquale Paoli (French name: Université de Corse Pascal Paoli)
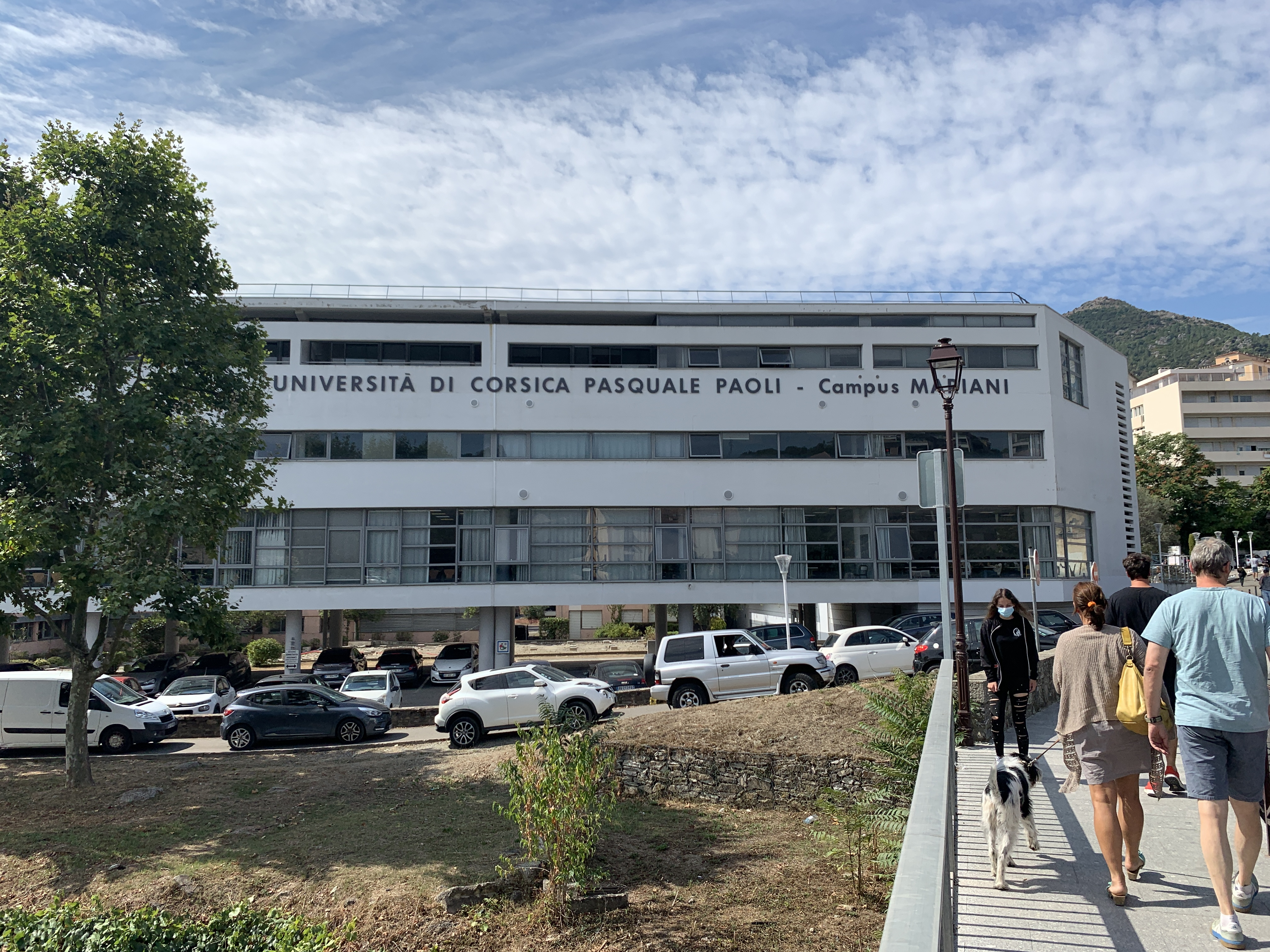
- Type: Public
- Established: 1981
- President: Paul-Marie Romani
- Students: 4,700
- Location: Corte, Corsica, France
- Campus: 4
- Website: www.universita.corsica
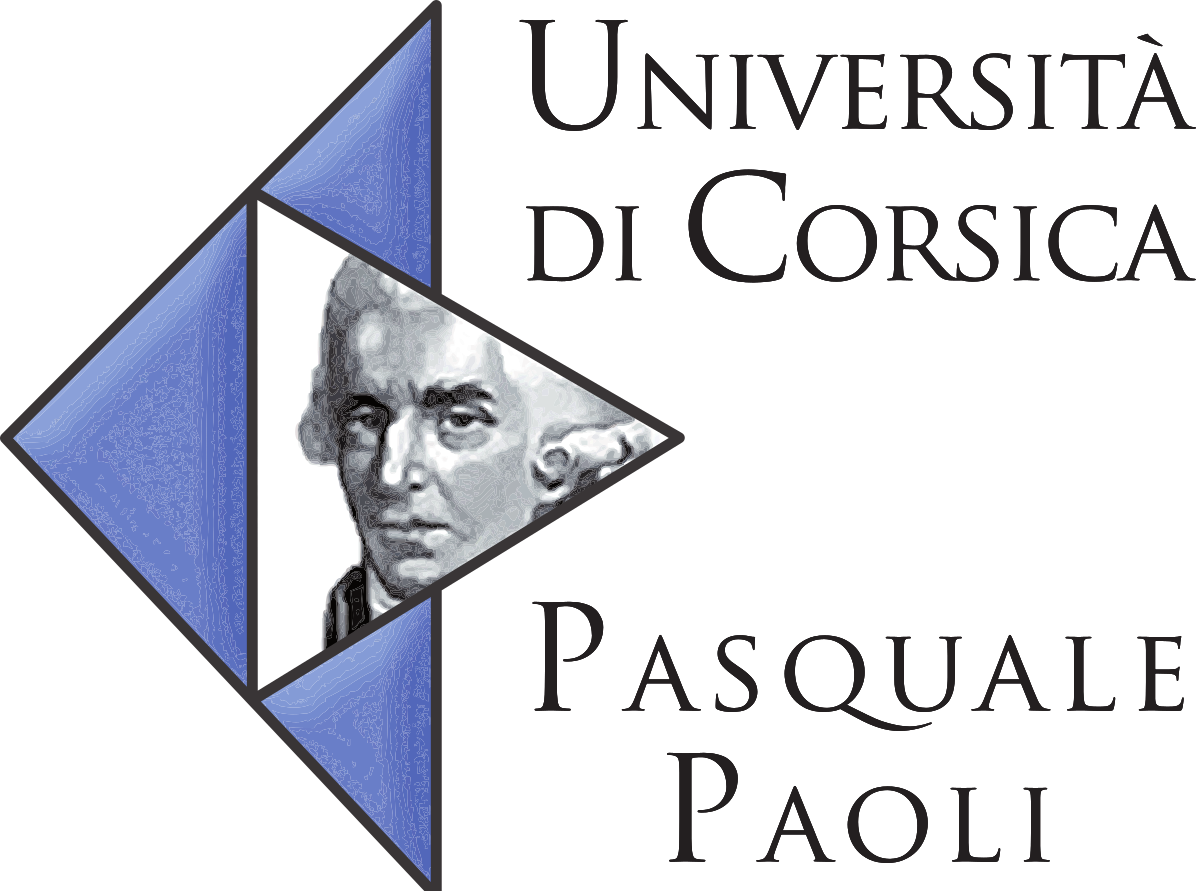

The University of Corsica Pasquale Paoli (Corsican: Università di Corsica Pasquale Paoli; French: Université de Corse Pascal Paoli) is a university, based in Corte, Haute-Corse, Corsica, France with secondary campuses in Ajaccio, Biguglia and Cargèse. Founded in 1765, closed in 1769, and re-founded in 1981, it is the only university on the island of Corsica.

== History ==
The university draws its inspiration from the historic 18th-century university founded by Pasquale Paoli, a key figure of the Corsican Enlightenment. The original university, established in 1765, operated briefly before closing due to war. In the early 1960s, student groups led by figures like Dominique Alfonsi began advocating for a Corsican university. By the mid-1970s, student movements like the Cunsulta di i Studienti Corsi in Nice radicalized, aligning with the FLNC and adopting Marxist-inspired decolonial ideologies. Successive French governments initially resisted the idea of a Corsican university, citing regional development policies prioritizing larger urban centers. Intense political and cultural pressure led Presidents Georges Pompidou and Giscard d’Estaing to approve the project. By the 1970s, Corte was chosen over Ajaccio and Bastia as the university’s location, partly due to lobbying by local leaders like François Giacobbi. The university was formally established in 1981. By 1983, the university had reached 1,000 students, growing to 2,200 by 1989 and 3,500 by the early 2000s, with around 4,000 students since the 2010s.

== Notable people ==
=== Faculty ===
- Xavier Mattei (born 1939, in Tunisia) - zoologist

=== Alumni ===
- Michel Castellani (born 1945) - politician
- Gilles Simeoni (born 1967) - politician

== See also ==
- List of public universities in France
- Pasquale Paoli
