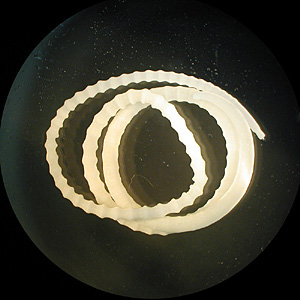
- Adult Moniliformis moniliformis

Scientific classification
- Kingdom: Animalia
- Phylum: Acanthocephala
- Class: Archiacanthocephala
- Order: Moniliformida; Schmidt, 1972
- Family: Moniliformidae; Van Cleave, 1924

= Moniliformidae =

Family of worms

Moniliformidae is a family of parasitic spiny-headed (or thorny-headed) worms. It is the only family in the Moniliformida order and contains three genera: Australiformis containing a single species, Moniliformis containing eighteen species and Promoniliformis containing a single species. Genetic analysis have determined that the clade is monophyletic despite being distributed globally. These worms primarily parasitize mammals, including humans in the case of Moniliformis moniliformis, and occasionally birds by attaching themselves into the intestinal wall using their hook-covered proboscis. The intermediate hosts are mostly cockroaches. The distinguishing features of this order among archiacanthocephalans is the presence of a cylindrical proboscis with long rows of hooks with posteriorly directed roots and proboscis retractor muscles that pierce both the posterior and ventral end or just posterior end of the receptacle. Infestation with Monoliformida species can cause moniliformiasis, an intestinal condition characterized as causing lesions, intestinal distension, perforated ulcers, enteritis, gastritis, crypt hypertrophy, goblet cell hyperplasia, and blockages.

== Taxonomy and description ==
Species of the family Moniliformidae are usually pseudosegmented and have a cylindrical proboscis with longitudinal rows of hooks that have posteriorly directed roots. Moniliformidae are further characterized by the presence of a simple, double-walled proboscis receptacle with the outer wall having spirally aligned muscle fibers (with the exception of Australiformis), brain at posterior end of receptacle, and dorsal and ventral lacunar canals. The proboscis retractor muscles pierce both the posterior and ventral end or just posterior end of the receptacle. The cerebral ganglion is in the mid to posterior region, and the lemnisci are long and flat and not bound to the body wall. These worms also lack protonephridia and males have eight cement glands, each with a giant nucleus, which are used to temporarily close the posterior end of the female after copulation. Genetic analysis has been conducted on four species: Moniliformis moniliformis, M. saudi, M. cryptosaudi and M. kalahariensis. Based on these results, Moniliformidae has been determined to be monophyletic.

Archiacanthocephala

- Archiacanthocephala
  - Oligacanthorhynchidae
    - Macracanthorhynchus ingens
    - Oncicola venezuelensis
    - Oligacanthorhynchus tortuosa
    - Nephridiacanthus major
  - - Moniliformidae
      Moniliformis moniliformis
    - Gigantorhynchida
      - Mediorhynchus sp.
      - Gigantorhynchus echinodiscus

Phylogenetic reconstruction for select species in the class Archiacanthocephala

== Genera ==
There are three genera and twenty living species in the order Moniliformida. (Note: A binomial authority in parentheses indicates that the species was originally described in a genus other than the present genus.)

=== Australiformis ===
Australiformis is a monotypic genus that infest marsupials in Australia and New Guinea. It was described by Schmidt and Edmonds in 1989. Its body consists of a proboscis armed with hooks which it uses to pierce and hold the gut wall of its host, and a long trunk. It contains a single species, Australiformis semoni. This genus resembles species in the genus Moniliformis but is characterized by a lack of spiral muscles in the outer wall of the proboscis receptacle. The proboscis is armed with 12 rows of 13 to 15 hooks which are used to attach themselves to the small or large intestines of the host. The female worms range from 95 to 197 millimetres, long virtually all of which is the trunk, and 1.75 to 3.5 millimetres wide. There is pronounced sexual dimorphism in this species as females are around twice the size of the males whose trunks range from 46 to 80 millimetres long and 2 millimetres wide. Infestation of marsupials by A. semoni may cause debilitating inflammation of the stomach (gastritis) with granulomatous ulcers.

=== Moniliformis ===
The genus Moniliformis Travassos, 1915 contains eighteen species. Description of the genus is the same as the family Moniliformidae with the exception of possessing spiral muscles in the outer wall of the proboscis receptacle and a single distinct kind of proboscis hooks.

=== Promoniliformis ===
The genus Promoniliformis Dollfus and Golvan, 1963 is characterized by possessing two distinct kinds of proboscis hooks. There is only one species in this genus. It contains a single species P. ovocristatus.

== Hosts ==
Moniliformidae species are found in the intestines parasitizing mammals and occasionally birds. Intermediate hosts are mostly cockroaches but also other insect groups. Infestation can cause moniliformiasis, which is characterized as lesions in the intestines, intestinal distension, perforated ulcers, enteritis, crypt hypertrophy, goblet cell hyperplasia, and occlusions of the intestinal tract in the gray squirrel (Sciurus carolinensis).

Hosts for Moniliformidae species

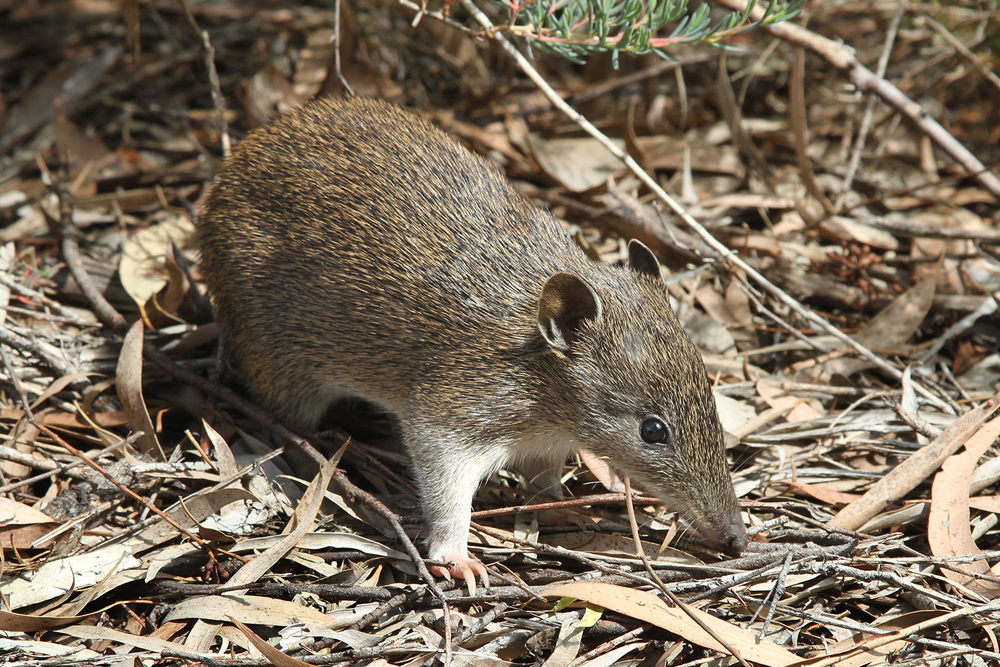
The Southern brown bandicoot is a host for Australiformis semoni

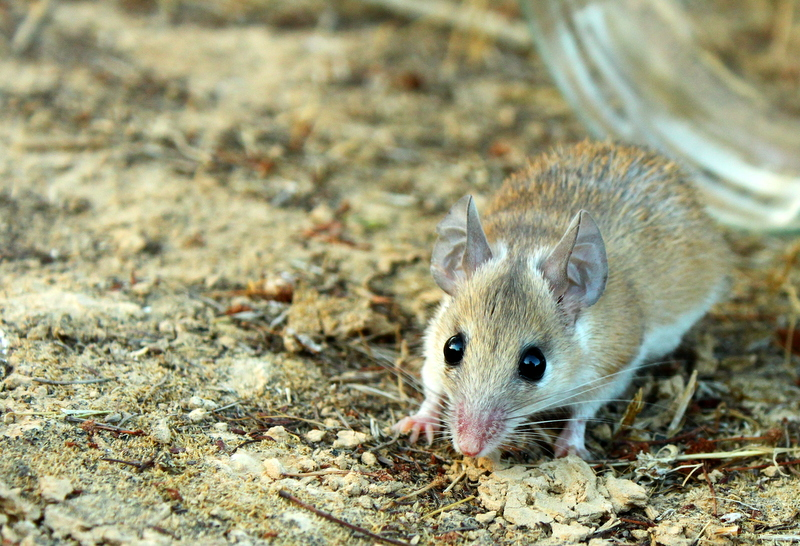
The Cairo spiny mouse is a host of Moniliformis acomysi

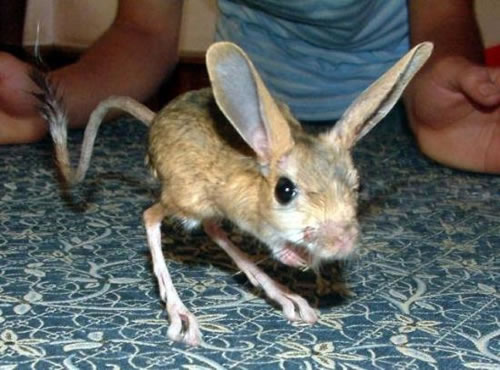
The four-toed jerboa is a host of Moniliformis aegyptiacus

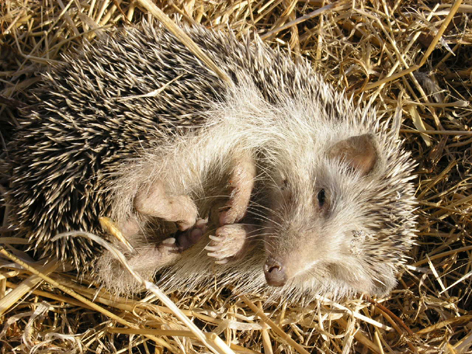
The North African hedgehog is a host of Moniliformis aegyptiacus

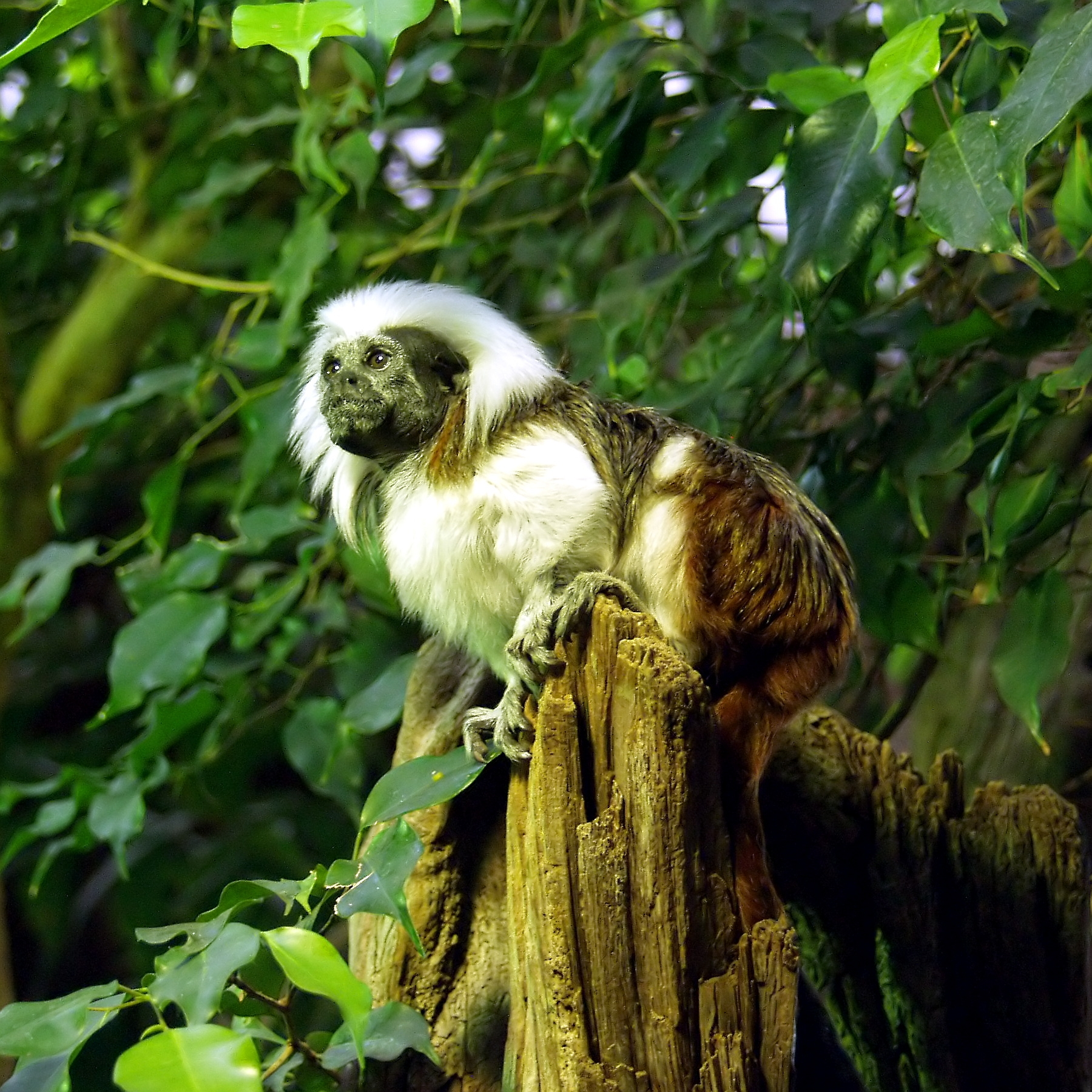
The cotton-top tamarins is a host of Moniliformis clarki

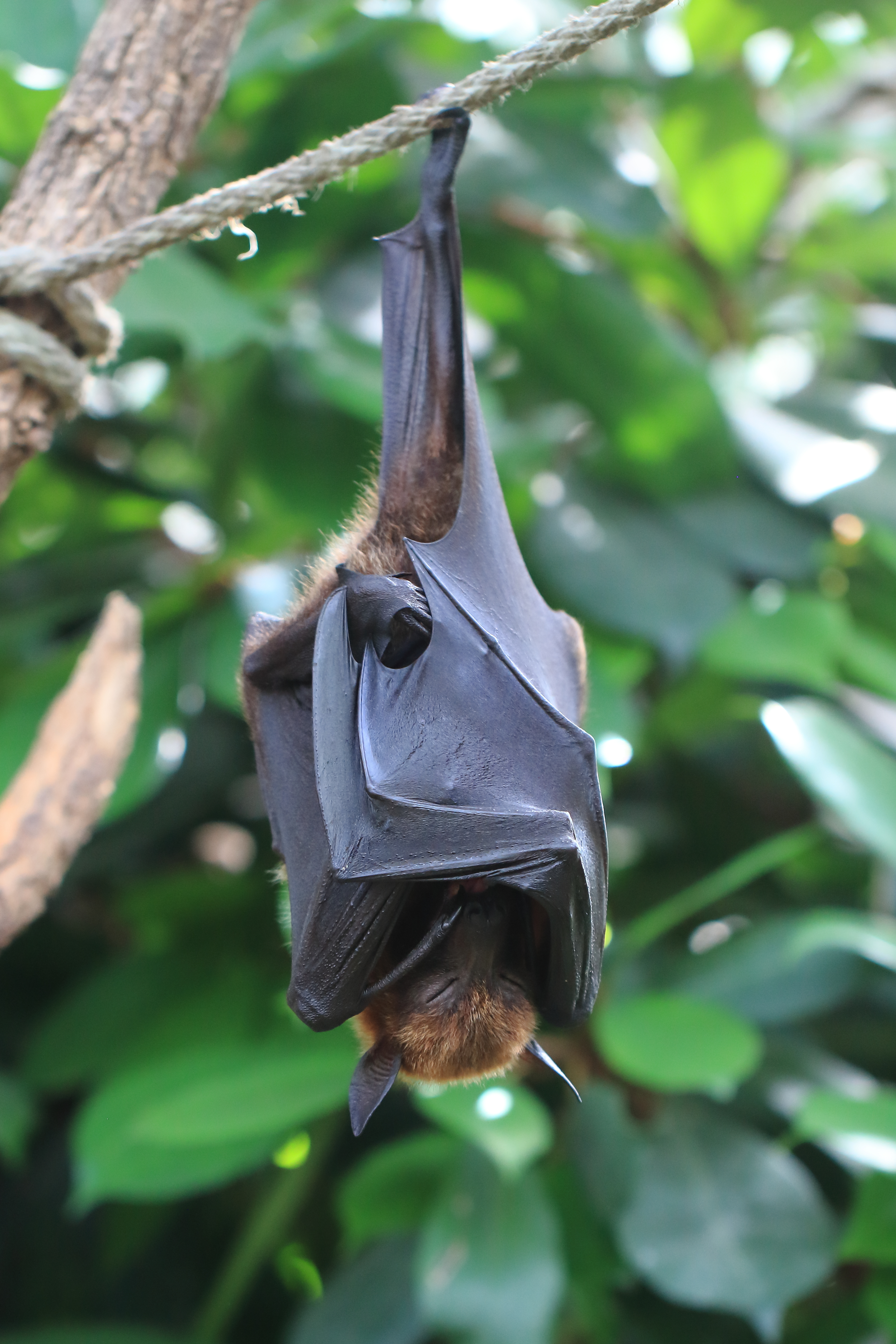
The large flying fox is a host of Moniliformis convolutus

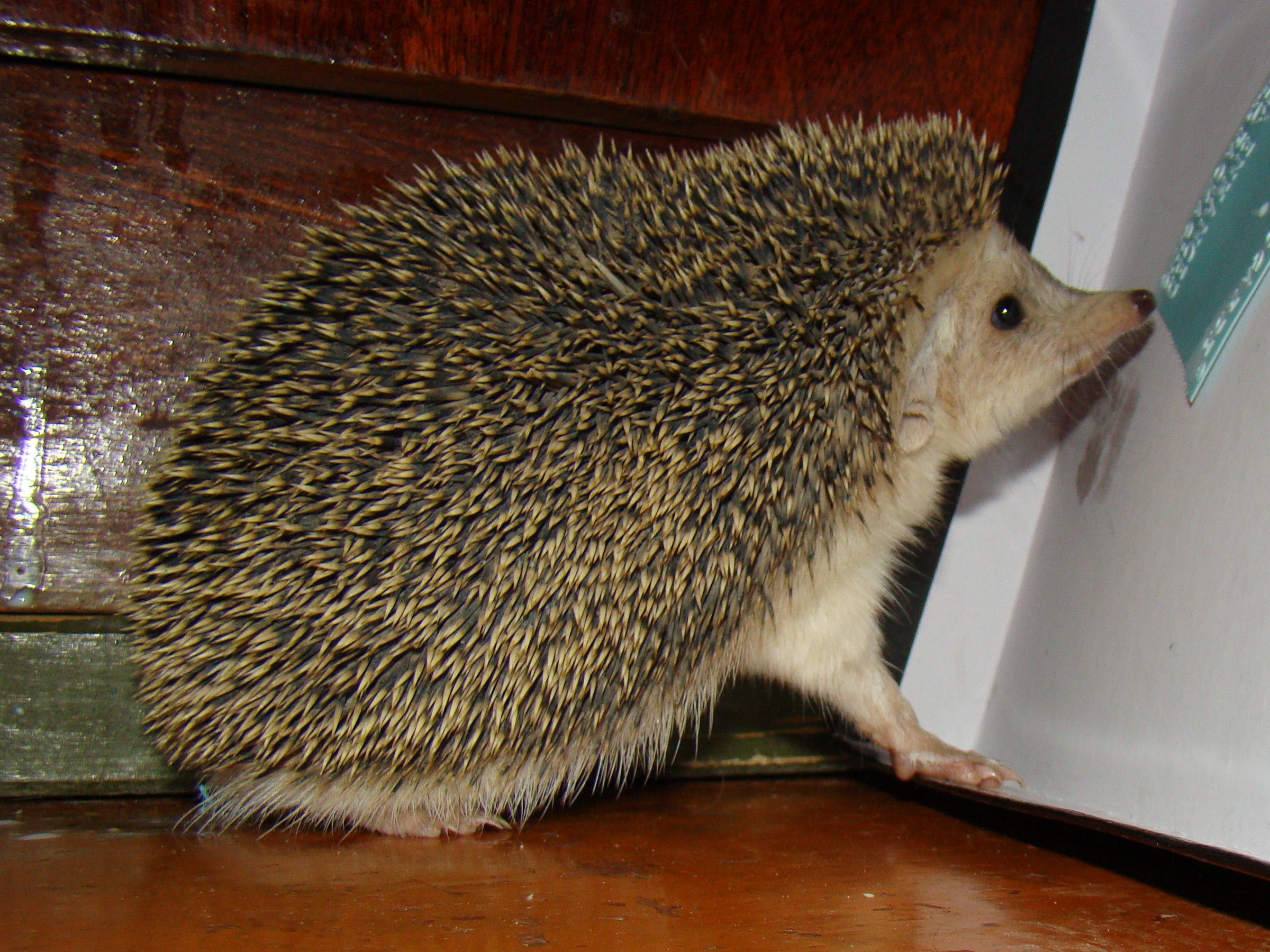
The long-eared hedgehog is a host of Moniliformis cryptosaudi

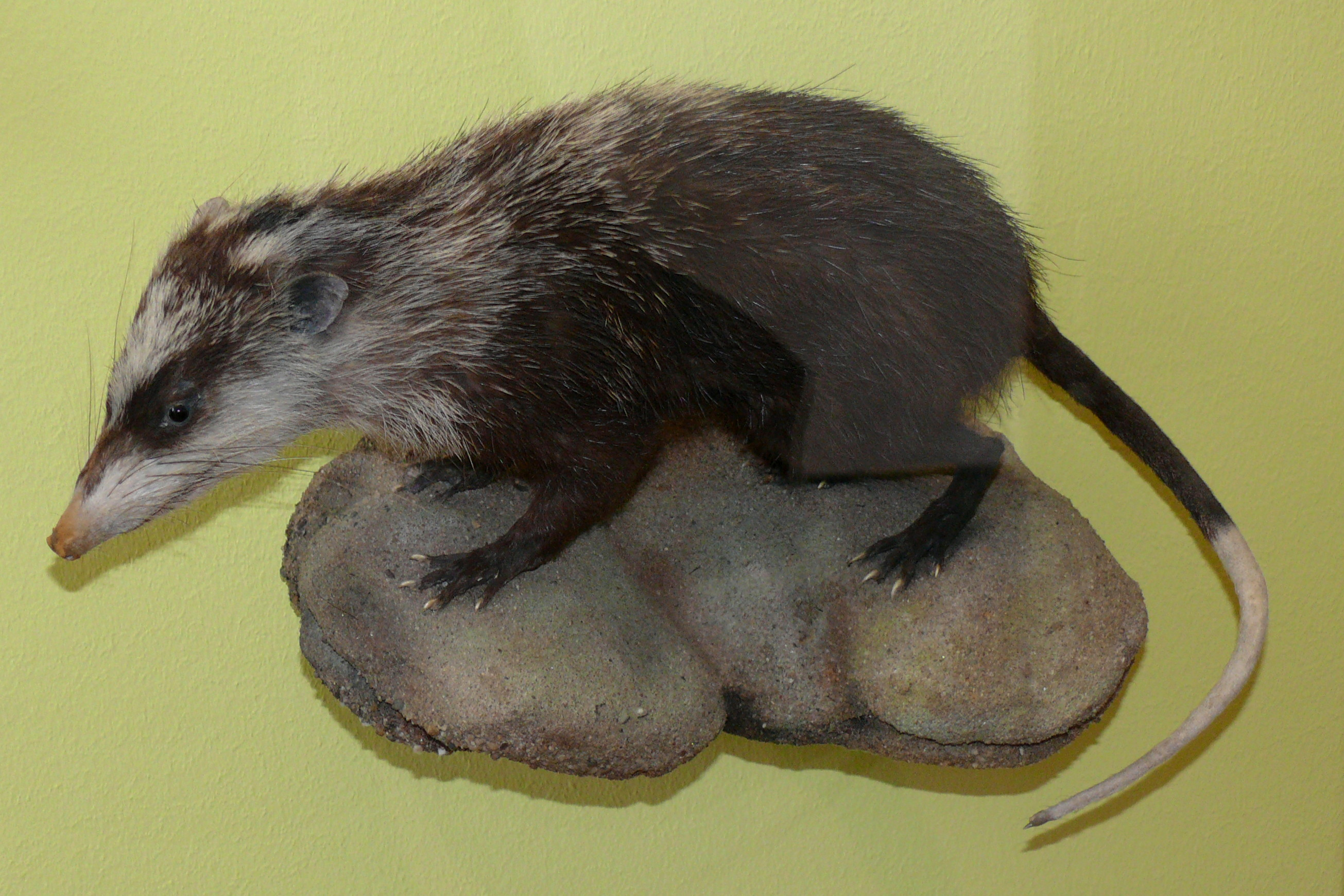
The moonrat is a host of Moniliformis echinosorexi

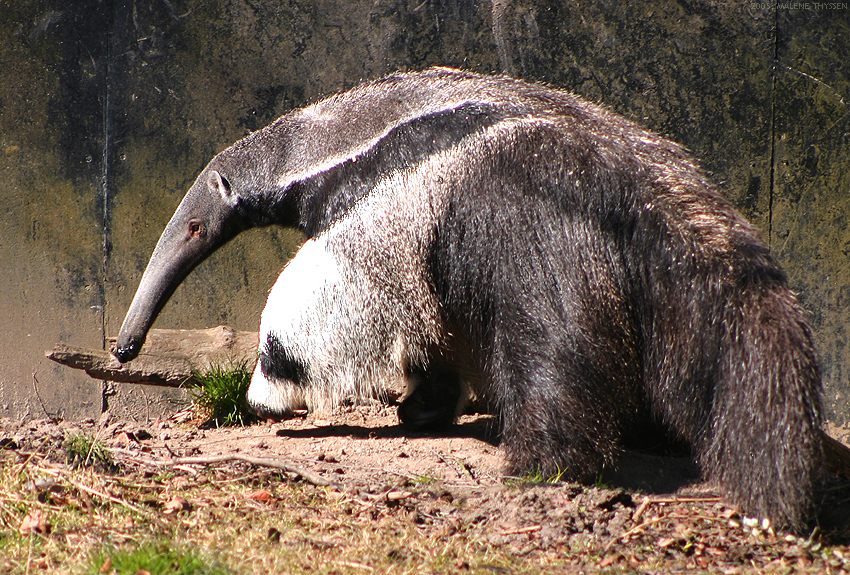
The giant anteater is a host of Moniliformis monoechinus

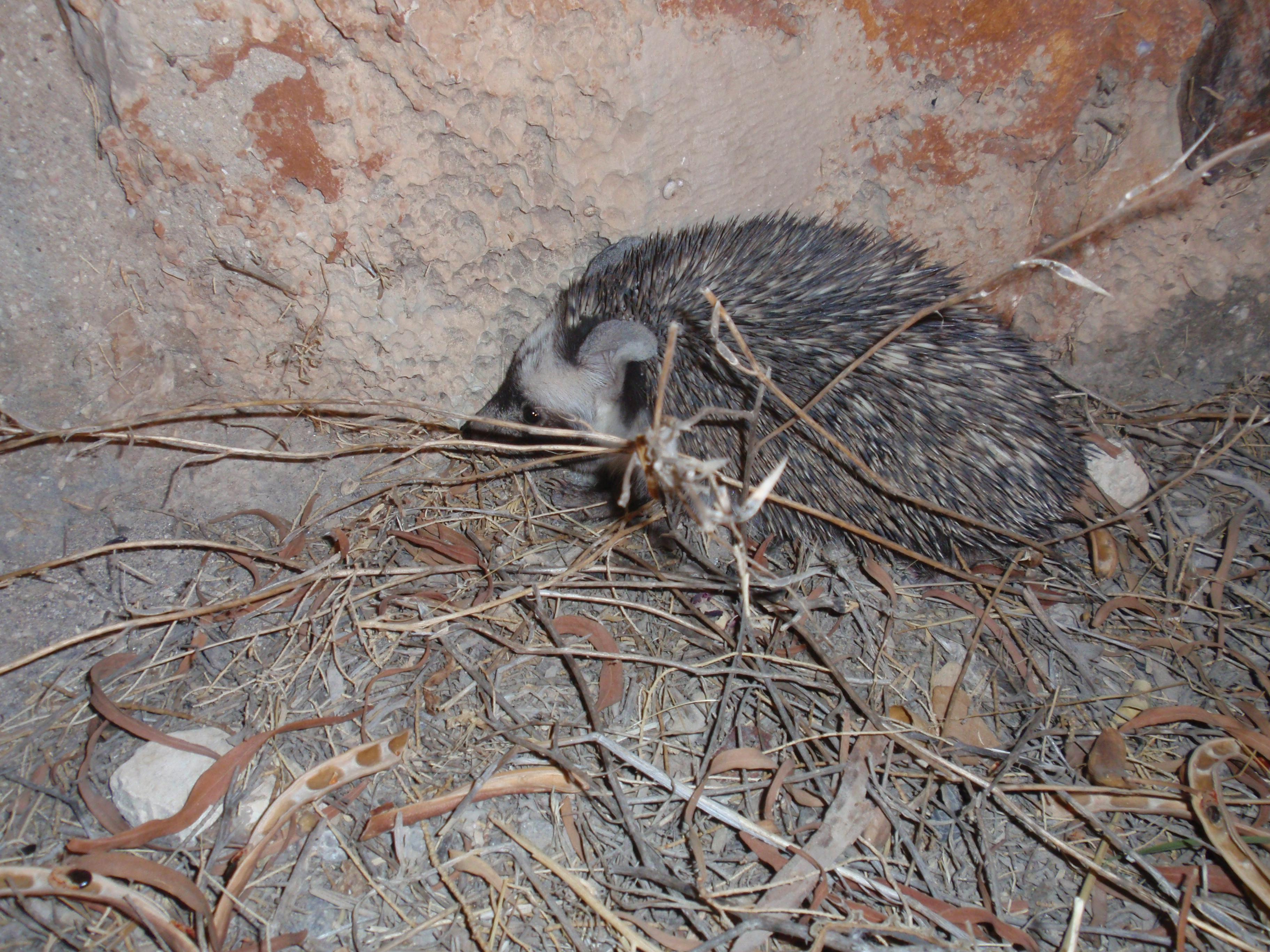
The desert hedgehog is a host of Moniliformis saudi

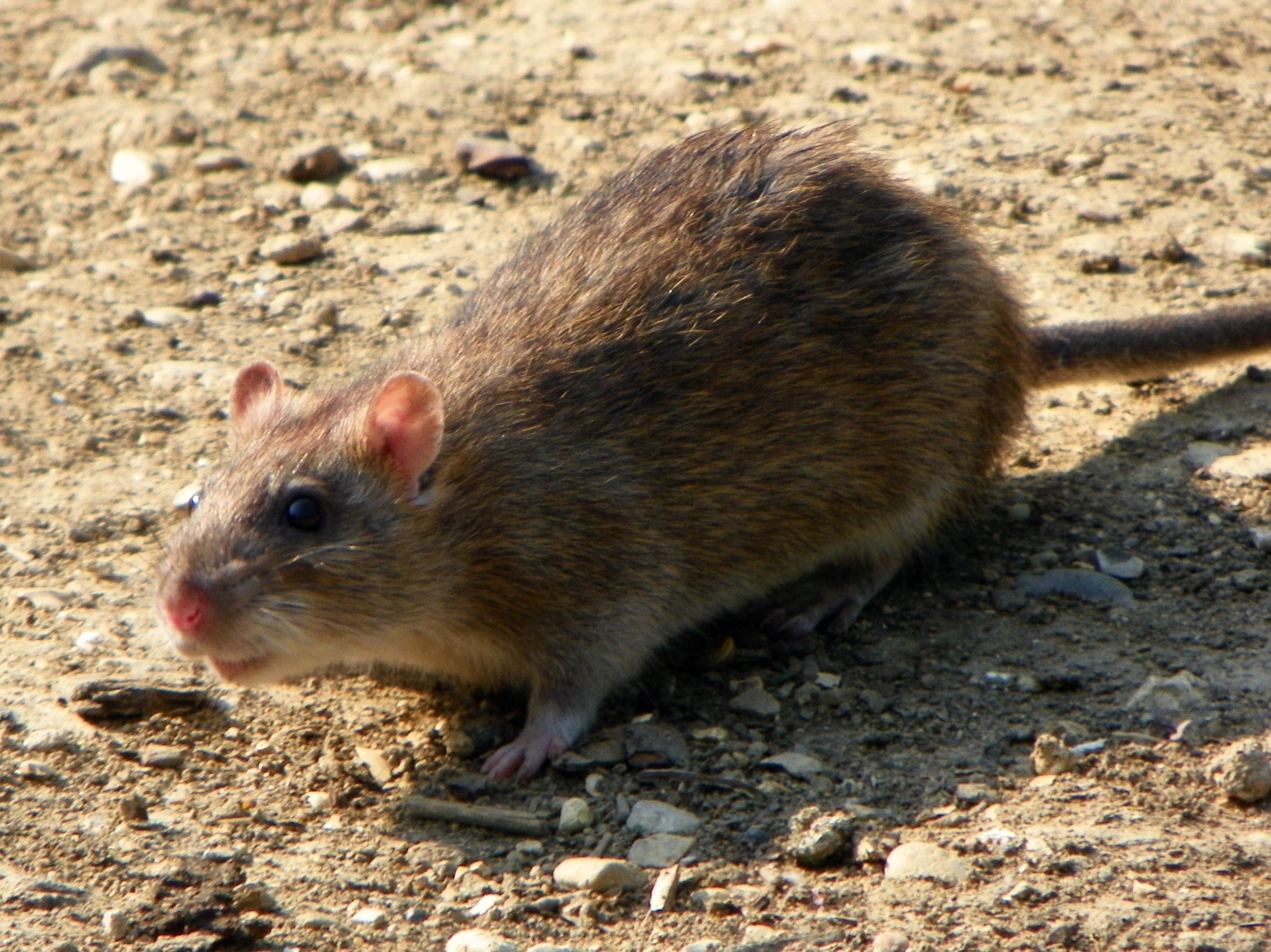
The brown rat is a host of M. siciliensis and Moniliformis travassosi

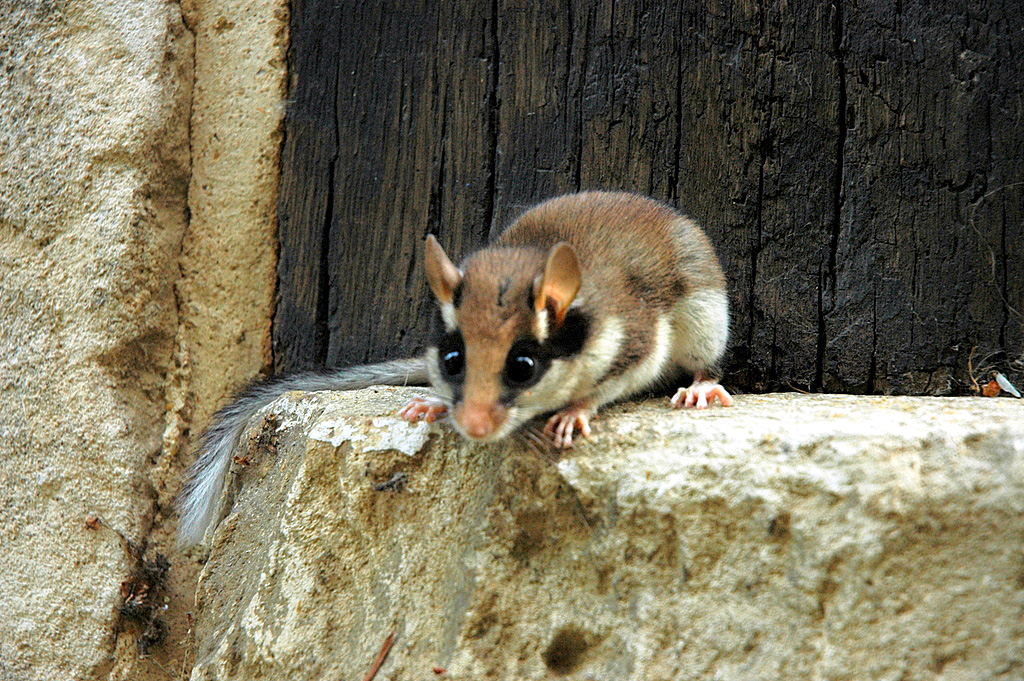
The garden dormouse is a host of M. siciliensis

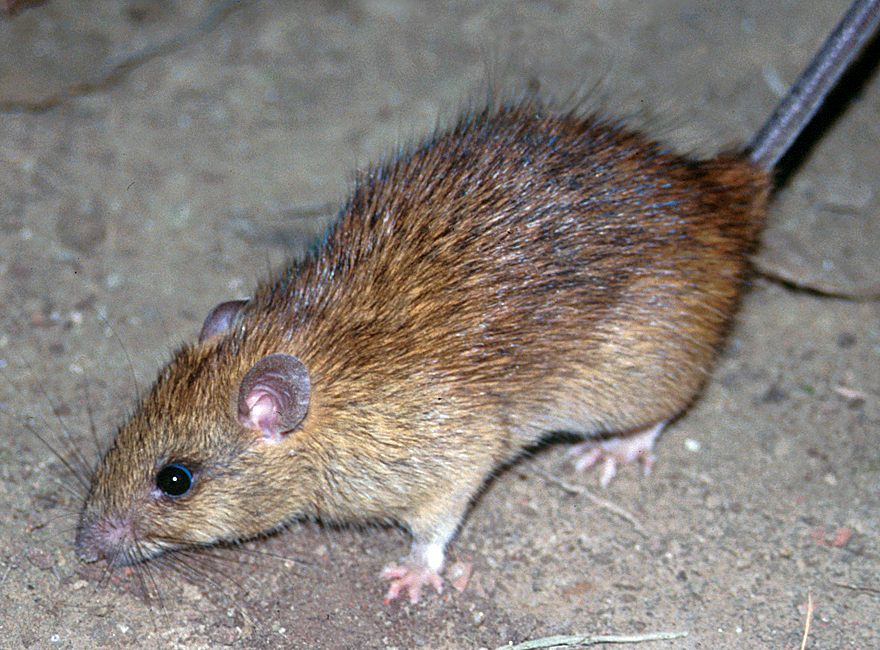
The black rat is a host of Moniliformis spiralis

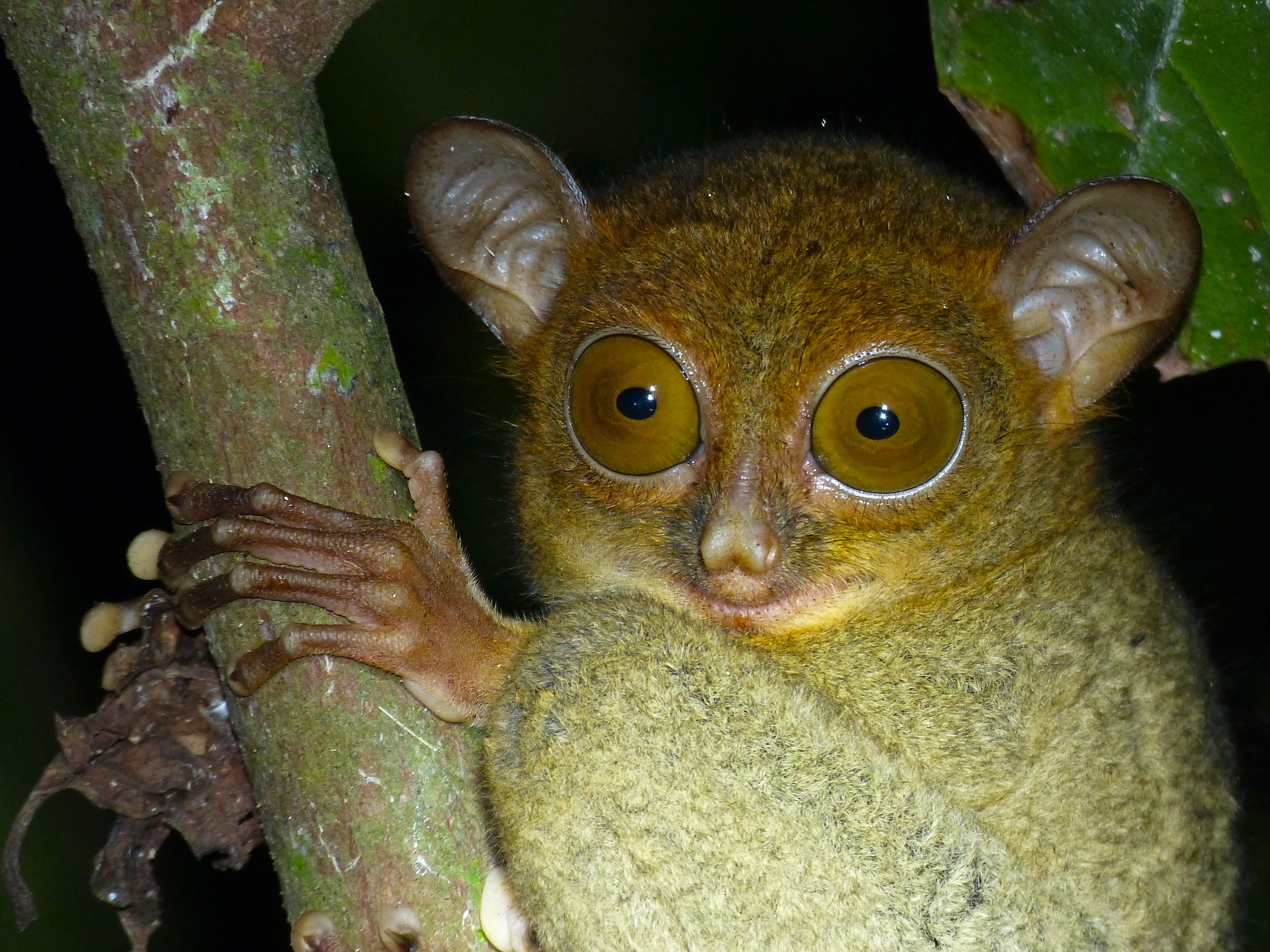
The Horsfield's tarsier is a host of Moniliformis tarsii

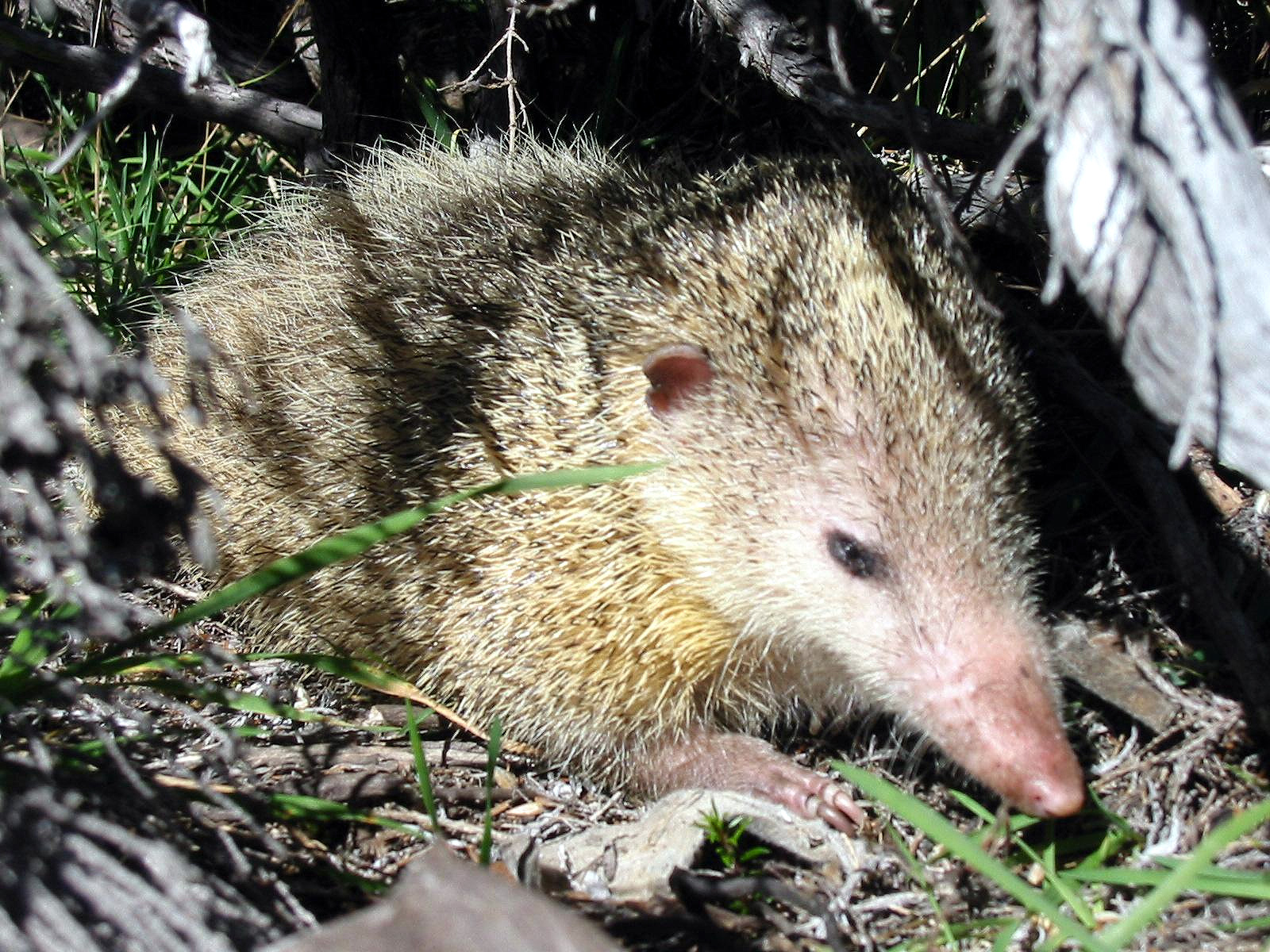
Promoniliformis ovocristatus is a parasite of the tailless tenrec

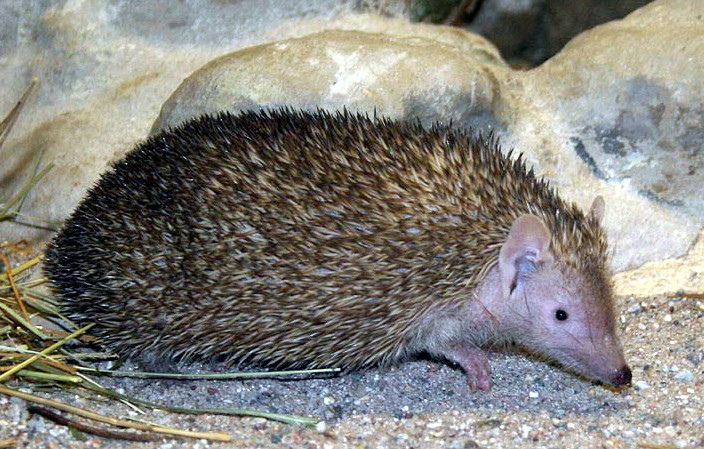
Promoniliformis ovocristatus is a parasite of the lesser hedgehog tenrec
