= Eidsvold =

Eidsvold may refer to:

== Australia ==
- Eidsvold, Queensland, a rural town and locality in the North Burnett Region

== Norway ==
- Eidsvoll, a town
- Eidsvold TF, a sports club in the town
- HNoMS Eidsvold, a Norwegian coast defence ship sunk in World War II
- MV Eidsvold

== United States ==
- Eidsvold Township, Lyon County, Minnesota,
- Eidsvold, Wisconsin, an unincorporated community in the town of Thorp, Wisconsin
