= Xavier Mattei =

French zoologist (born 1939)

- Born: 2 February 1939 (age 87); Ferryville, Tunisia
- Citizenship: France
- Education: Cheikh Anta Diop University
- Known for: sperm ultrastructure
- Scientific career
- Fields: Zoology
- Workplaces: Cheikh Anta Diop University, University of Corsica Pasquale Paoli

Xavier Mattei is a French zoologist; his research was mainly in the field of sperm ultrastructure, including fish and a variety of invertebrates such as flatworms and acanthocephalans.

He is one of the most prolific authors in the field of sperm morphology and its use for the understanding of phylogeny, with more than 150 papers published.

== Career ==
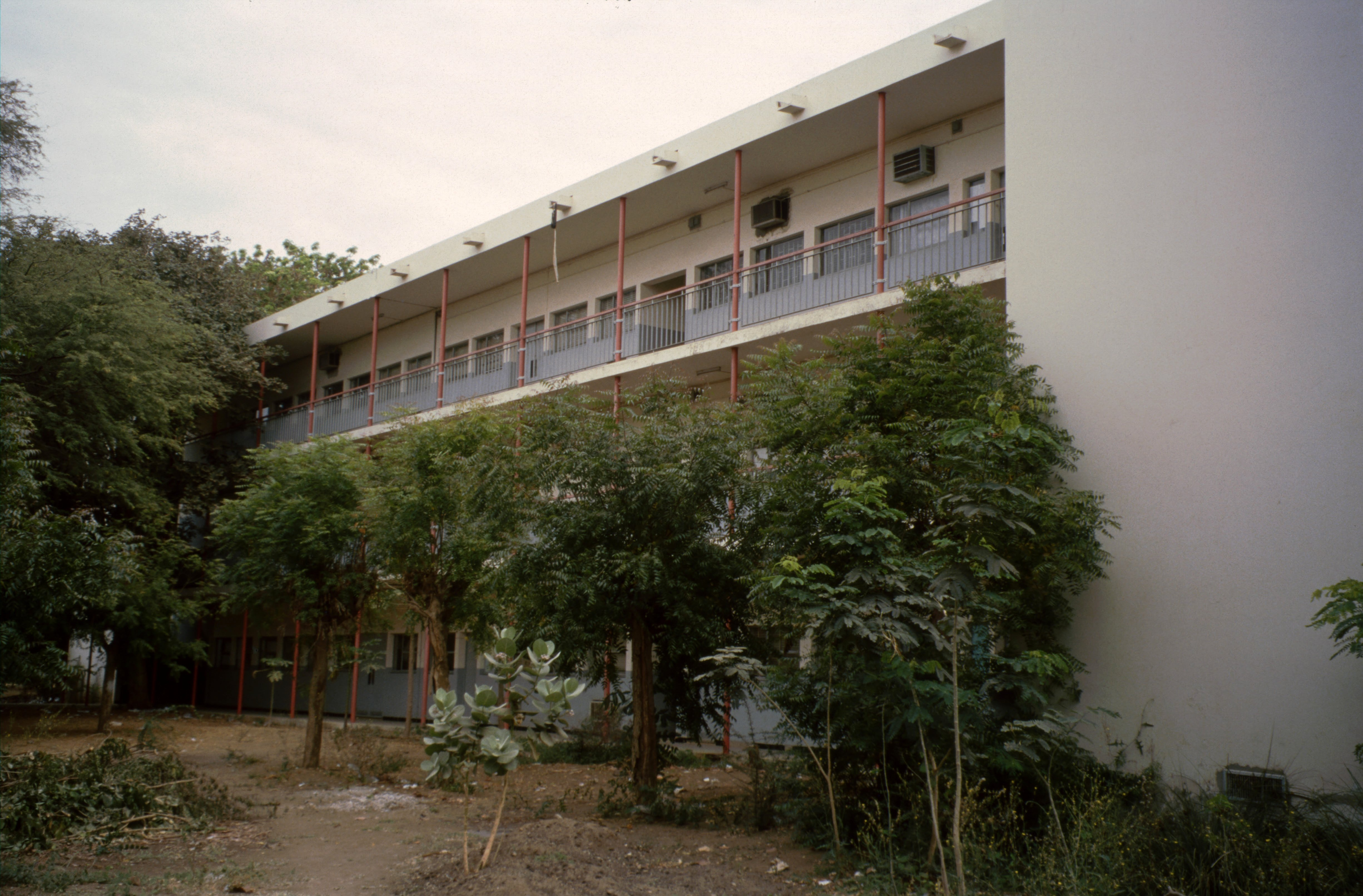
The Department of Animal Biology of the University of Dakar (in 1996)

Xavier Mattei was a student at the University of Dakar in Senegal, then he became "Assistant", later "Maître-Assistant" and finally Professor in 1978. He was the Director of the Department of Animal Biology in this University from 1972 to 1986. In 1993, he left Senegal for joining the University of Corsica until his retirement in 2000.

Xavier Mattei has established a Service of Electron Microscopy in the University of Dakar which allowed many researchers to study cell ultrastructure and produce a great number of scientific publications in the fields of zoology, cell biology, medicine and parasitology. This Service had three electron microscopes. He was the founder and the Head of this Service from 1970 to 1993.

== Eponymous taxa ==
Two species have been named in his honour: the Microsporidia Unikaryon matteii Toguebaye & Marchand, 1984 and the Acanthocephalan Mediorhynchus mattei Marchand & Vassiliadès, 1982. Both are parasitic species collected from animals in Senegal.

== Archaeology ==
As an amateur archaeologist, Xavier Mattei collected many artifacts in the Senegalese village of La Somone, South of Dakar, over a period of more than 40 years. His findings were published in a book in 2015.

- Xavier Mattei. La Somone. Sénégal. Traces d’histoire (2015) Escourbiac imprimeur à Graulhet, 81300 (87 pages) ISBN 9782955274606.

== Cartoonist ==
After his retirement, Xavier Mattei published three books of cartoons about Corsica.

- Xavier Mattei. La Corse. Dessins en liberté surveillée. 2001. Édition Anima Corsa, Bastia (133 pages) ISBN 9782912819086.
- Xavier Mattei. La Corse. Dessins libres. 2004. Édition Anima Corsa, Bastia (115 pages) ISBN 9782912819383.
- Xavier Mattei. La Corse. Dessins identitaires. 2008. Édition Anima Corsa, Bastia (87 pages) ISBN 9782912819659.
