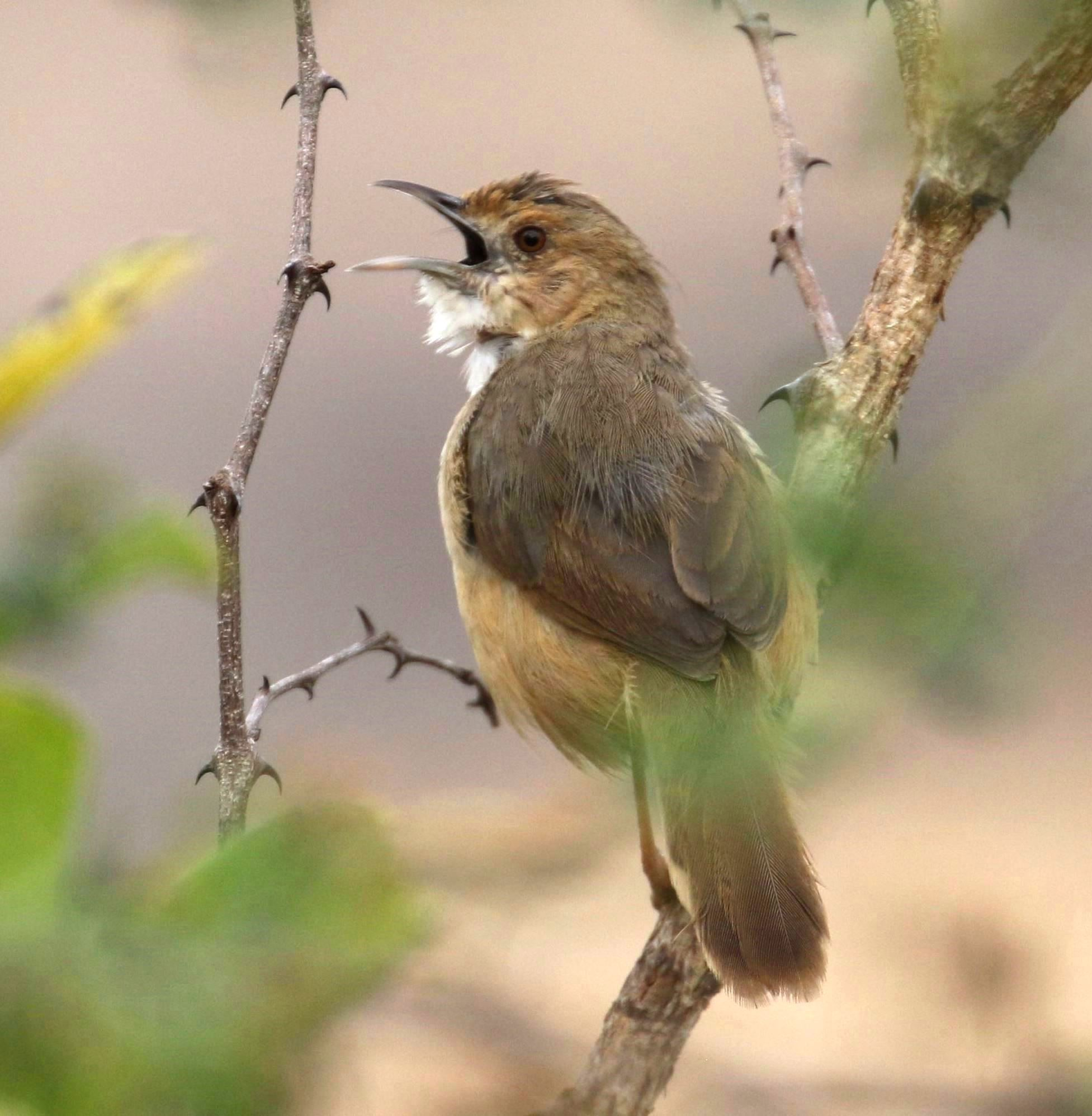
- Singing near the Crocodile River in Mpumalanga, South Africa

Conservation status
- Least Concern (IUCN 3.1)

Scientific classification
- Kingdom: Animalia
- Phylum: Chordata
- Class: Aves
- Order: Passeriformes
- Family: Cisticolidae
- Genus: Cisticola
- Species: C. erythrops

Binomial name
- Cisticola erythrops (Hartlaub, 1857)

Audio
- Song recorded in Limpopo, South Africa

= Red-faced cisticola =

Species of bird

The red-faced cisticola (Cisticola erythrops) is a species of bird in the family Cisticolidae. It is widely present across sub-Saharan Africa (rare in southern Africa). Its natural habitats are subtropical or tropical seasonally wet or flooded lowland grassland and swamps.

== Taxonomy ==
The red-faced cisticola was formally described in 1857 by the German ornithologist Gustav Hartlaub under the binomial name Drymoeca erythrops based on a specimen collected near Calabar in Nigeria. The specific epithet erythrops combines the Ancient Greek ερυθρος/eruthros meaning "red" with ωψ/ōps meaning "eye" or "face". The red-faced cisticola is now one of 53 species placed in the genus Cisticola that was introduced in 1829 by the German naturalist Johann Jakob Kaup.

Six subspecies are recognised:

- Cisticola erythrops erythrops (Hartlaub, 1857) – Mauritania, Senegal and Gambia to Central African Republic, Congo and Gabon
- Cisticola erythrops pyrrhomitra Reichenow, 1916 – southeast Sudan and Ethiopia
- Cisticola erythrops niloticus Madarász, G, 1914 – central Sudan
- Cisticola erythrops sylvia Reichenow, 1904 – northeast DR Congo and south Sudan to Kenya and central Tanzania
- Cisticola erythrops nyasa Lynes, 1930 – southeast DR Congo and south Tanzania to east South Africa
- Cisticola erythrops lepe Lynes, 1930 – Angola

The race C. e. lepe, found in Angola and possibly the southeast of the Democratic Republic of Congo, has sometimes been regarded as a separate species.

== Gallery ==
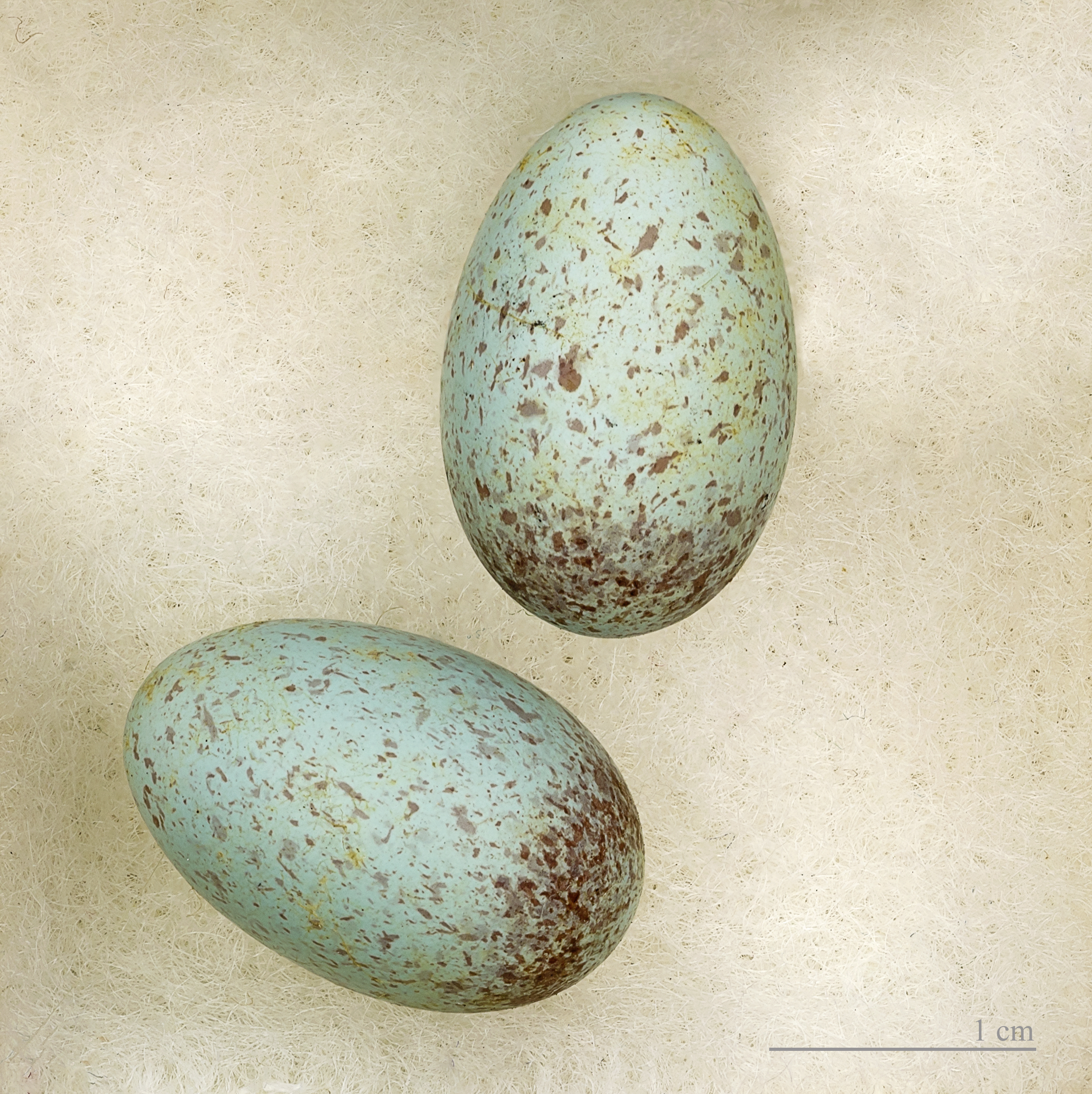
Cisticola erythrops - MHNT

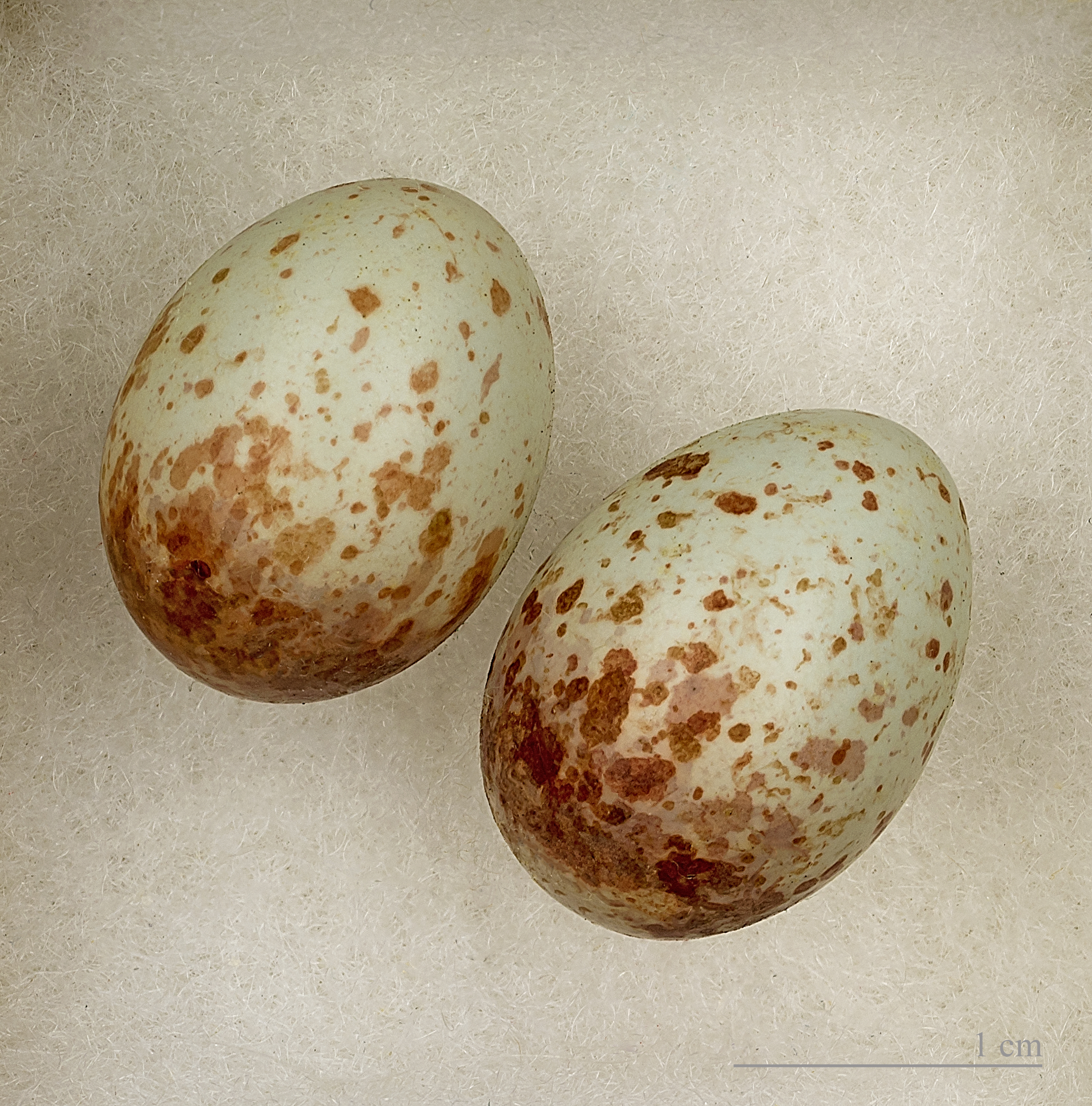
Cisticola erythrops sylvia - MHNT

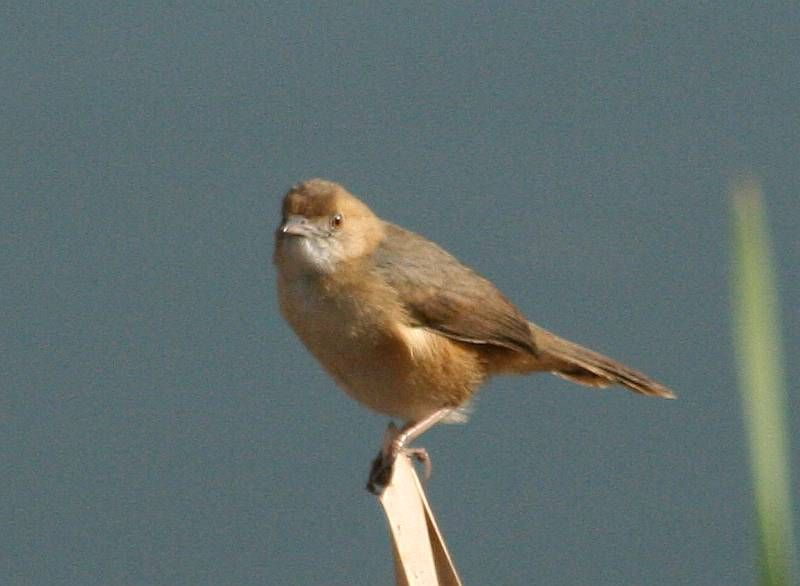
Non-breeding adult at Pietermaritzburg, South Africa

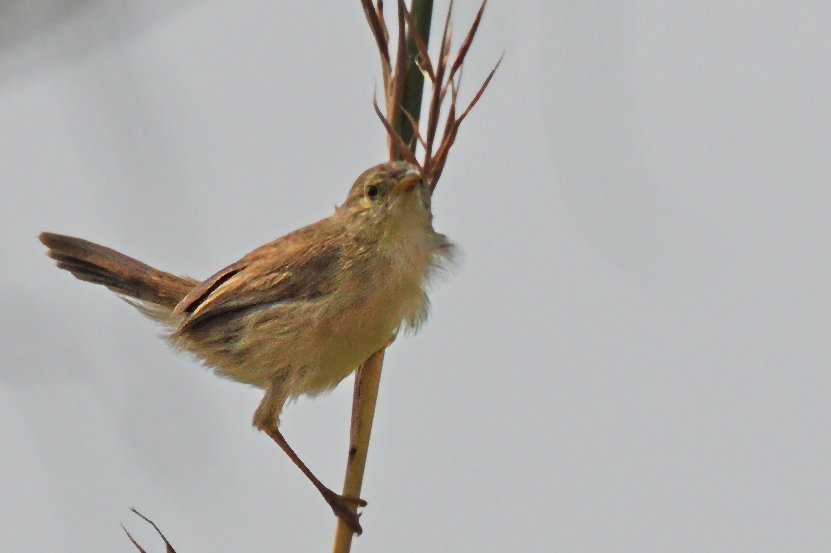
In Cuanza Norte Province, northern Angola
