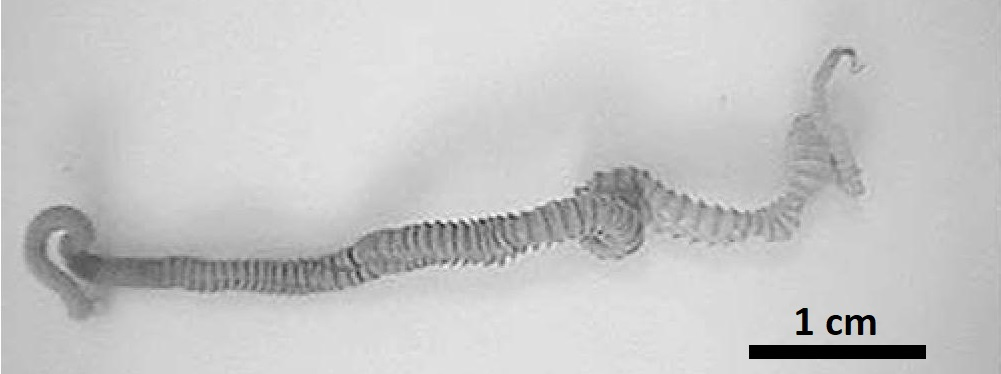
- Gigantorhynchus ortizi

Scientific classification
- Kingdom: Animalia
- Phylum: Acanthocephala
- Class: Archiacanthocephala
- Order: Gigantorhynchida
- Family: Gigantorhynchidae
- Genus: Gigantorhynchus; Hamann, 1892

Type species
- Gigantorhynchus echinodiscus (Diesing, 1851)

Other species
- Gigantorhynchus lopezneyrai; Gigantorhynchus lutzi; Gigantorhynchus ortizi; Gigantorhynchus pesteri ?; Gigantorhynchus ungriai

= Gigantorhynchus =

Genus of parasitic worms

Gigantorhynchus is a genus of Acanthocephala (thorny-headed worms, also known as spiny-headed worms) that parasitize marsupials, anteaters, and possibly baboons by attaching themselves to the intestines using their hook-covered proboscis. Their life cycle includes an egg stage found in host feces, a cystacanth (larval) stage in an intermediate host such as termites, and an adult stage where cystacanths mature in the intestines of the host. This genus is characterized by a cylindrical proboscis with a crown of robust hooks at the apex followed by numerous small hooks on the rest of the proboscis, a long body with pseudosegmentation, filiform lemnisci, and ellipsoid testes. The largest known specimen is the female G. ortizi with a length of around 240 millimetres (9.4 in) and a width of 2 millimetres (0.08 in). Genetic analysis on one species of Gigantorhynchus places it with the related genus Mediorhynchus in the family Gigantorhynchidae. Six species in this genus are distributed across Central and South America and possibly Zimbabwe. Infestation by a Gigantorhynchus species may cause partial obstructions of the intestines, severe lesions of the intestinal wall, and may lead to death.

== Taxonomy ==
The name Gigantorhynchus is derived from two Ancient Greek words: gígantas, which Otto Hamann used in 1892 as a descriptor for the family and genus when grouping the larger varieties of these worms, (Note: "The larger varieties belong to this group/classification" (original German: "Wie der Name besagt, sind es große Formen, die hierher gehören.")) and rhúnkhos, meaning snout, nose, or beak, which describes the characteristic proboscis in this genus of Acanthocephala. Phylogenetic analysis has been conducted on only one of the six species in the genus, G. echinodiscus, using the gene for 28S ribosomal RNA and confirms that this species forms a monophyletic group with the related genus Mediorhynchus in the family Gigantorhynchidae. The type species is G. echinodiscus.

Archiacanthocephala

- Archiacanthocephala
  - Oligacanthorhynchidae
    - Macracanthorhynchus ingens
    - Oncicola venezuelensis
    - Oligacanthorhynchus tortuosa
    - Nephridiacanthus major
  - - Moniliformidae
      Moniliformis moniliformis
    - Gigantorhynchida
      - Mediorhynchus sp.
      - Gigantorhynchus echinodiscus

Phylogenetic reconstruction for select species in the class Archiacanthocephala based on a 28S rRNA gene comparison from Gomes et al. (2019) and a 18S rDNA gene comparison from Amin et al. (2020).

== Description ==
Number of proboscis hooks
Species	Hooks
G. echinodiscus	18
G. lopezneyrai	12
G. lutzi	12
G. ortizi	12
G. pesteri	4
G. ungriai	18

The genus Gigantorhynchus is characterized by the presence of a cylindrical proboscis with a crown of robust hooks at the apex followed by numerous small hooks on the rest of the proboscis. The body, or trunk, is long with pseudosegmentation, the lemnisci are filiform, and the testes are ellipsoid. Species of Gigantorhynchus are distinguished based on the number and size of hooks on the crown of the proboscis, the type of pseudosegmentation, and size of the ellipsoid eggs. Males of all species possess eight cement glands which are used to temporarily close the posterior end of the female after copulation. There is pronounced sexual dimorphism with the female often two or more times longer than the male.

Anatomical measurements
Female measurements (mm)
Measurements	G. echinodiscus	G. lopezneyrai	G. lutzi (Note: One value for the length of the proboscis and lemnisci, and width of proboscis in G. lutzi is reported for both sexes)	G. ortizi (Note: One range of values for the length of the proboscis and lemnisci, and width of proboscis in G. ortizi is reported for both sexes)	G. pesteri (Note: Data for G. pesteri reported from immature female specimens.)	G. ungriai (Note: One range of values for the length of the proboscis and lemnisci, and width of proboscis in G. ungriai is reported for both sexes)
Length of proboscis	0.49–0.71	?	1.695	1.45–1.72	0.35	0.189–1.0
Width of proboscis	0.46–0.53	?	0.735	0.435–0.555	0.1	0.237–0.7
Length of proboscis receptacle	0.63–0.74	?	?	0.750–0.920	0.75	?
Width of proboscis receptacle	0.23–0.31	?	?	?	0.18–0.2	?
Length of trunk	52.92–102.79	?	130–200	130–242	15–18	129–136
Width of trunk	0.79–1.13	?	1–2.5	1.5–2.0	0.8–0.9	1–1.6
Length of small rootless spines	0.07	?	0.048	0.05	0.015	0.02–0.06
Length of lemnisci	13.23	?	2.595	5.48–6.80	3.6–4	1.75–3.27
Size of eggs	0.064 × 0.036	?	0.115 × 0.064	0.079–0.085 × 0.049–0.054	?	0.04–0.06 × 0.04
Male measurements (mm)
Length of proboscis	0.45–0.65	1.131–1.5	1.695	1.45–1.72	?	0.189–1.0
Width of proboscis	0.30–0.55	0.66	0.735	0.435–0.555	?	0.237–0.7
Length of proboscis receptacle	0.48–0.64	?	?	0.750–0.920	?	?
Width of proboscis receptacle	0.21–0.32	?	?	?	?	?
Length of trunk	14.80–45.29	16–58	35–60	46–75	?	22–36
Width of trunk	0.53–0.99	1–1.7	0.75–1.15	1.4–1.92	?	0.78–1.58
Length of small rootless spines	0.07	?	0.048	0.05	?	0.02–0.06
Length of lemnisci	8.02 to 20.30	8	2.595	5.48–6.80	?	1.75–3.27
Size of anterior testis	1.63–2.71 x 0.26–0.32	0.7–0.190	5.752–6.045 x 0.750–0.900	1.98–3.0 x 0.56–0.96	?	2.0–5.6 x 0.395–0.474
Size of posterior testis	1.61–2.66 x 0.26–0.39	?	?	?	?	?

== Species ==
There are six valid species in the genus Gigantorhynchus, although one species out of the six, G. pesteri, appears to be incorrectly assigned.

- Gigantorhynchus echinodiscus (Diesing, 1851) (Note: A binomial authority in parentheses indicates that the species was originally described in a genus other than Gigantorhynchus. This species was originally named Echinorhynchus echinodiscus by Karl Moritz Diesing in 1851 but moved to Gigantorhynchus by Hamann in 1892.)

G. echinodiscus is a tropical parasite of anteaters including the giant anteater (Myrmecophaga tridactyla), the southern tamandua (Tamandua tetradactyla) and the silky anteater (Cyclopes didactylus). It has been found in Brazil, Venezuela, Panama, and Trinidad Island. Intermediate hosts include two species of termites from Brazil (Labiotermes emersoni and Orthognathotermes heberi). It is the first species to be described in the genus Gigantorhynchus and is the type species.

Morphological traits used to distinguish the species include a cylindrical proboscis with a crown having eighteen large hooks followed by 21 to 23 small rootless spines arranged in two longitudinal rows. The first row has six hooks measuring between 0.16 and 0.23 mm from the tip of the hook to the root. The second row has twelve hooks in pairs which are smaller than first row measuring between 0.18 and 0.19 mm from the tip of the hook to the root. The crown is separated from numerous small, rootless spines by a short space without hooks. Twenty-one to twenty-three small, rootless spines are arranged in longitudinal rows 0.05 to 0.08 mm long. The lemnisci reach the middle of the trunk and are sometimes bent back on themselves. Other traits include a lateral papilla at the base of the proboscis, a small region (2.24 to 3.21 mm long) after the proboscis with no segmentation, a ringed with no complete segmentation, large testes, eight cement glands in pairs occupying a region measuring between 0.98 and 2.13 mm long and between 0.45 and 0.76 mm wide, and a non-segmented region in the posterior end of the body.

The male has two ellipsoid testes that are narrow and in tandem. The posterior end after the anterior testes without a segmented region measures between 5.45 and 8.53 mm. In the female, the gonopore is subterminal and the vagina has a sinuous lateral region shaped like a guitar. The genital pore including the vagina, uterus, and uterine bell (a funnel like opening continuous with the uterus) is between 0.69 and 0.97 mm long. The eggs contain three membranes.

- Gigantorhynchus lopezneyrai Diaz-ungria, 1958

G. lopezneyrai has been found parasitizing the Southern tamandua (Tamandua tetradactyla) in Venezuela. The trunk is slightly segmented and no female measurements were taken in its original description. There are twelve hooks on the proboscis (4 in the first circle each around 0.235 mm long, and 8 in the second circle each around 0.106 mm long). The eight cement glands are organized in pairs. Amato (2014) raised doubts about the validity of this species suggesting that the hook number and arrangement is an incorrect observation that needs to be revisited as no drawings of the proboscis showing the hook formation was published. This species is named in honour of Carlos Rodríguez López-Neyra de Gorgot, a Spanish parasitologist.

- Gigantorhynchus lutzi Machado, 1941

G. lutzi has been found parasitising a Bare-tailed woolly opossum (Caluromys philander) in Pará, Brazil and infesting the small intestine of the Common opossum (Didelphis marsupialis) in Huánuco, Peru. It was the second species in the genus Gigantorhynchus to be described. The body is ringed with no complete segmentation. There are twelve hooks on the proboscis including six in the first circle each measuring 0.285 by 0.165 mm, and six in the second circle measuring 0.225 by 0.135 mm. The eight cement glands are organized in pairs.

- Gigantorhynchus ortizi Sarmiento, 1954

G. ortizi has been found infesting the intestines of the Brown four-eyed opossum (Metachirus nudicaudatus) and possibly a White-bellied slender opossum (Marmosops cf. noctivagus) both between Iquitos and Nauta in Peru. Another survey found nearly 100% of the Brown four-eyed opossum were infected with this parasite in the Darien Province of Panama and the Departments of Chocó, Meta, and Nariño in Colombia. Infestations ranged from 20 to 60 worms per host almost completely obstructing the intestines in several of the sampled hosts. The trunk pseudosegmented or slightly segmented. There are twelve hooks on the proboscis (six in the first circle each measuring 0.160 by 0.10 mm, and six in the second circle measuring 0.140 by 0.09 mm). The eight cement glands are organized in groups. It was named in honour of Dr. Javier Ortiz de La Puente, a Peruvian ornithologist from the Museum of the University of San Marcos, Lima, Peru who collected the brown four-eyed opossum from La Merced, Junin, Peru, which later was determined to have been infested with this new species of acanthocephalan.

- Gigantorhynchus pesteri Tadros, 1966

G. pesteri was recorded from an unknown baboon species in Rhodesia (now Zimbabwe). Gomes (2019) considers this Gigantorhynchus species to be incorrectly assigned due to a lack of information including missing registration number and deposit of specimen in a collection, missing type host species, unusual hook arrangement and number, and the description being based on only two immature females. The proboscis has only four hooks whereas other species in the genus have either twelve or eighteen hooks on their proboscis.

- Gigantorhynchus ungriai Antonio, 1958

G. ungriai has been found parasitizing a Southern tamandua (Tamandua tetradactyla) in Guayo, Delta Amacuro, Venezuela. The body is ringed and has a cylindrical shape with a complete segmentation consisting of a union in dorsal and ventral regions. The anterior end without segmentation measures 2 to 2.6 mm long. The retractable proboscis has eighteen hooks arranged in two circular rows. The first row has six hooks that are 0.140 to 0.2 mm long and the second row has twelve hooks that are 0.104 to 0.180 mm long. The eight cement glands occupy a space of 0.869 by 0.1896 mm. The female genital tract made of an ovary-uterus extends throughout the length of the body. The male genitals occupy one quarter of the length of the body and contains elliptical testicles and eight peripheral prostate glands. The species name was named after Carlos Díaz Ungría.

== Hosts and pathology ==
Life cycle of Acanthocephala. (Note: There are no known aberrant human infections for Gigantorhynchus species.)

The life cycle of an acanthocephalan consists of three stages beginning when an infective acanthor (development of an egg) is released from the intestines of the definitive host and then ingested by an arthropod, the intermediate host. Although the intermediate hosts of most Gigantorhynchus are not known, for the order Gigantorhynchida, this intermediate host is usually an insect. When the acanthor molts, the second stage called the acanthella begins. This stage involves penetrating the wall of the mesenteron or the intestine of the intermediate host and growing. The final stage is the infective cystacanth which is the larval or juvenile state of an Acanthocephalan, differing from the adult only in size and stage of sexual development. The cystacanths within the intermediate hosts are consumed by the definitive host, usually attaching to the walls of the intestines, and as adults they reproduce sexually in the intestines. The acanthor are passed in the feces of the definitive host and the cycle repeats. There are no known paratenic hosts (hosts where parasites infest but do not undergo larval development or sexual reproduction) for Gigantorhynchus.

Gigantorhynchus species infest marsupials and myrmecophagids (anteaters) in Central and South America and possibly a baboon from Africa. They are found in the intestines. Cystacanths, the larval state of an Acanthocephalan, of G. echinodiscus were found in the hemocoels of soldier termites, the intermediate host. Termites infested with G. echinodiscus show head shape abnormalities and discolouration. Although worker termites feed directly on the feces of the definitive host (the location of the eggs of G. echinodiscus) it is not known why they are not infected with cystacanths or how they pass the eggs on to the soldiers where they develop into cystocanths. The giant anteater diet consists almost entirely of termites and the cystacanths from consumed termites mature and reproduce in the intestines of the host and the eggs are then passed in the feces. Infestation of the giant anteater can cause at least partial obstructions of the intestines, severe lesions of the intestinal wall, and may lead to death. There are no reported cases of any Gigantorhynchus species infesting humans in the English language medical literature.

Hosts for Gigantorhynchus species

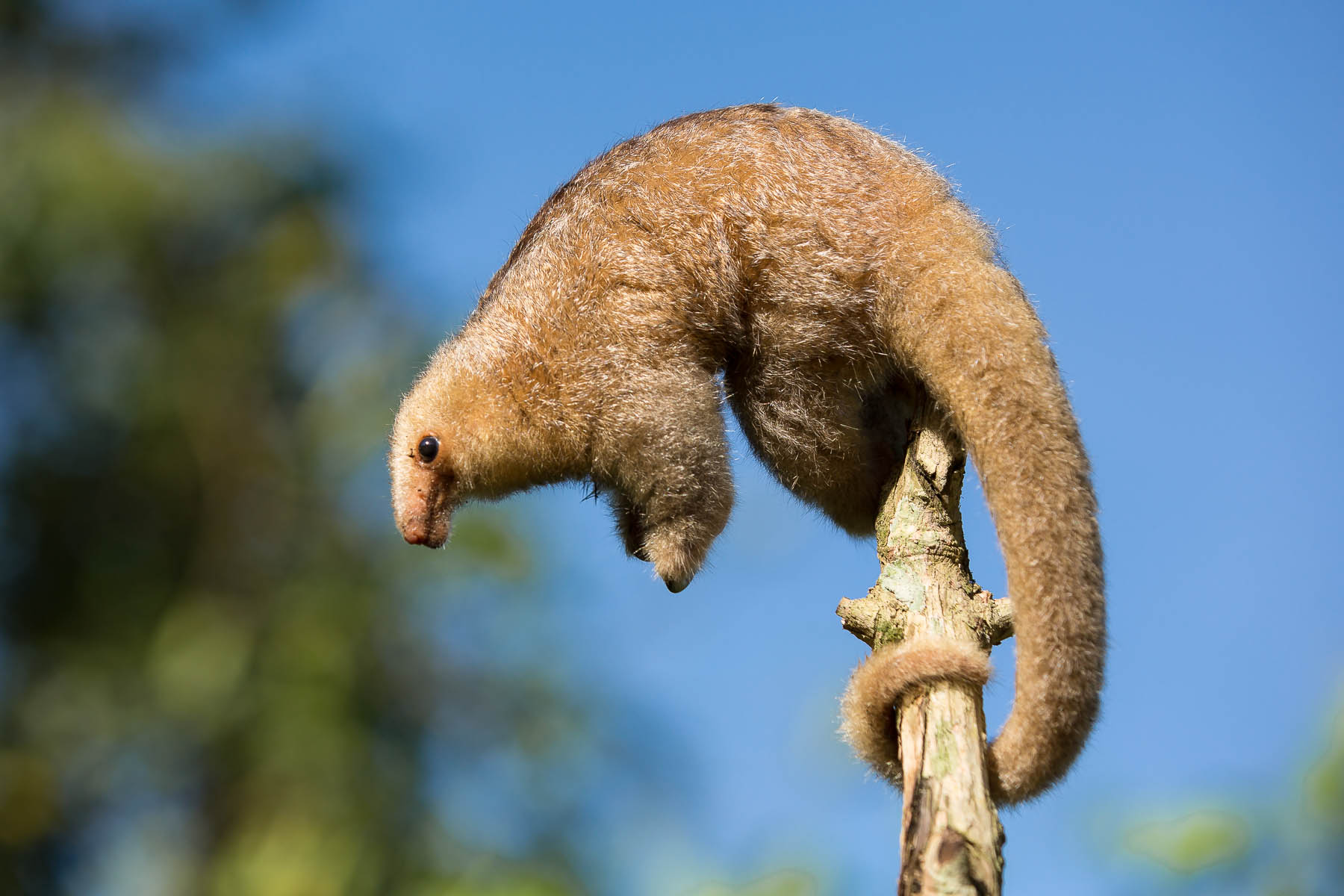
The Silky anteater is a host for G. echinodiscus

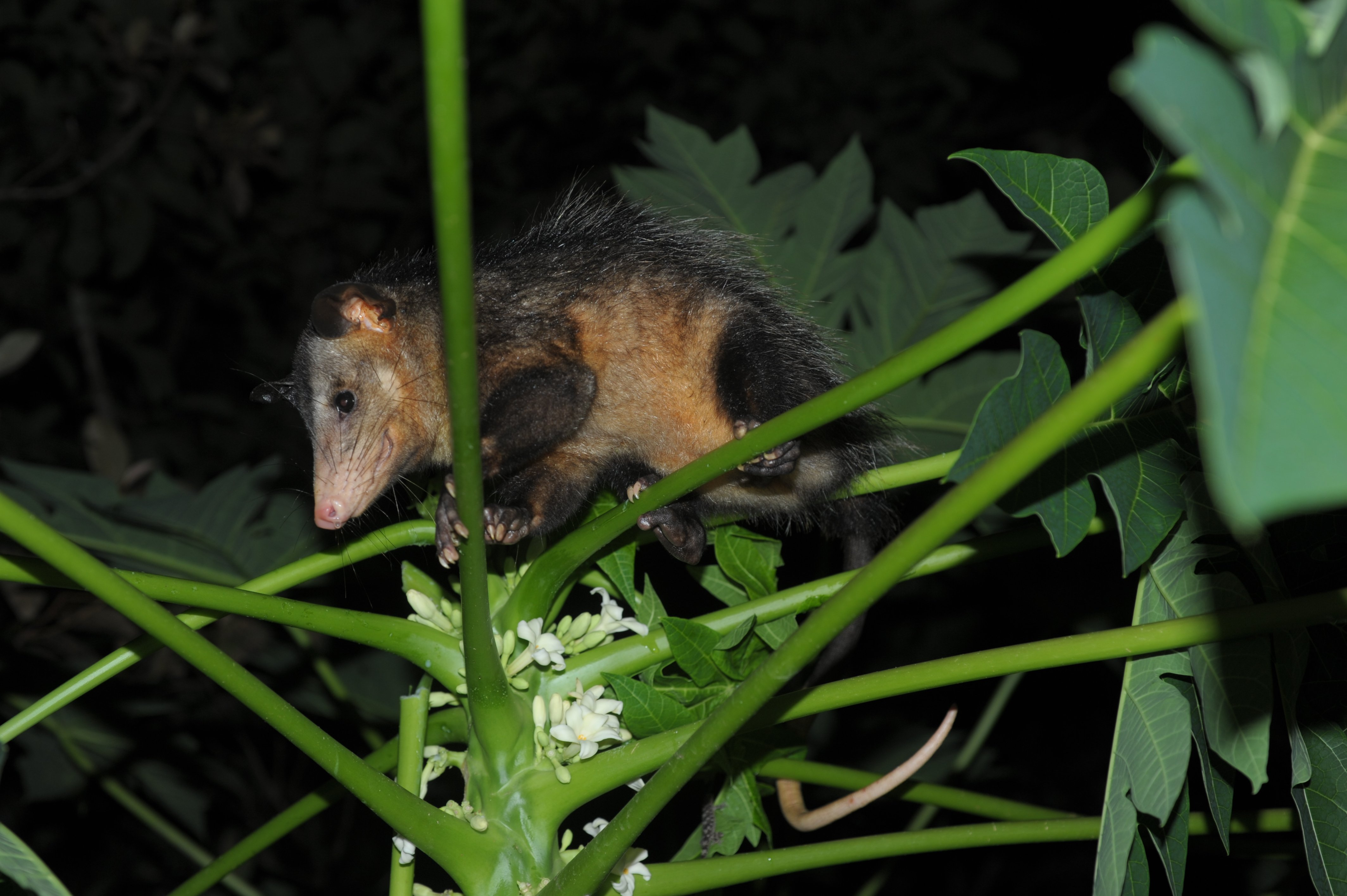
The common opossum is a host for G. lutzi

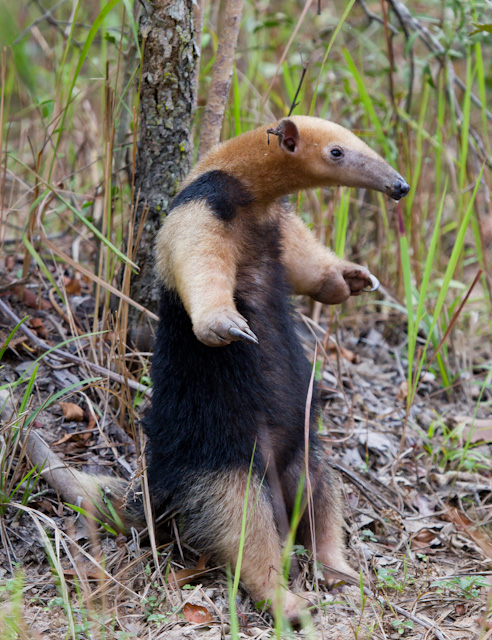
The Southern tamandua is one of the hosts of G. echinodiscus, G. lopezneyrai and G. ungriai

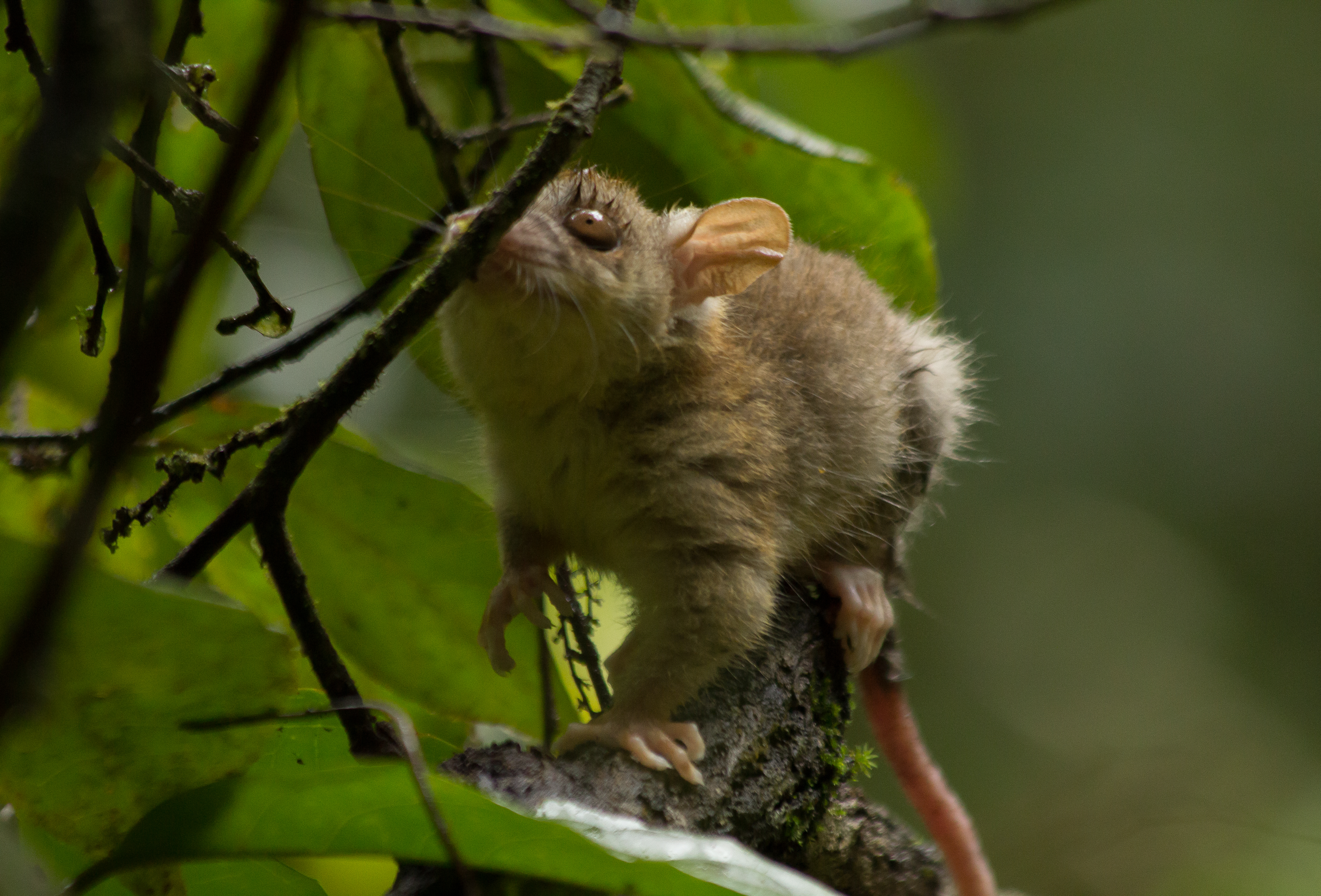
The Bare-tailed woolly opossum is one of the hosts of G. lutzi

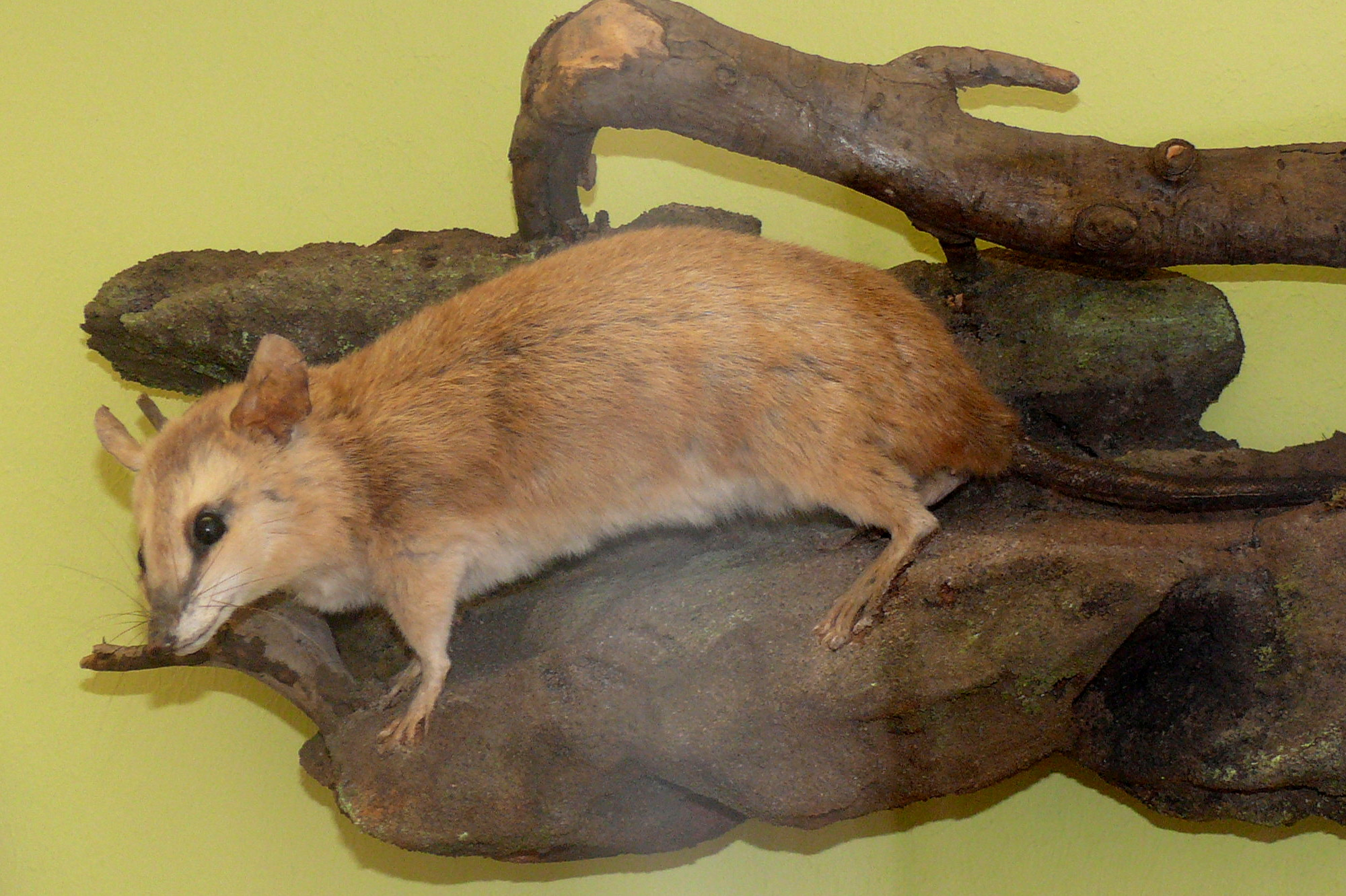
The Brown four-eyed opossum is one of the hosts of G. ortizi

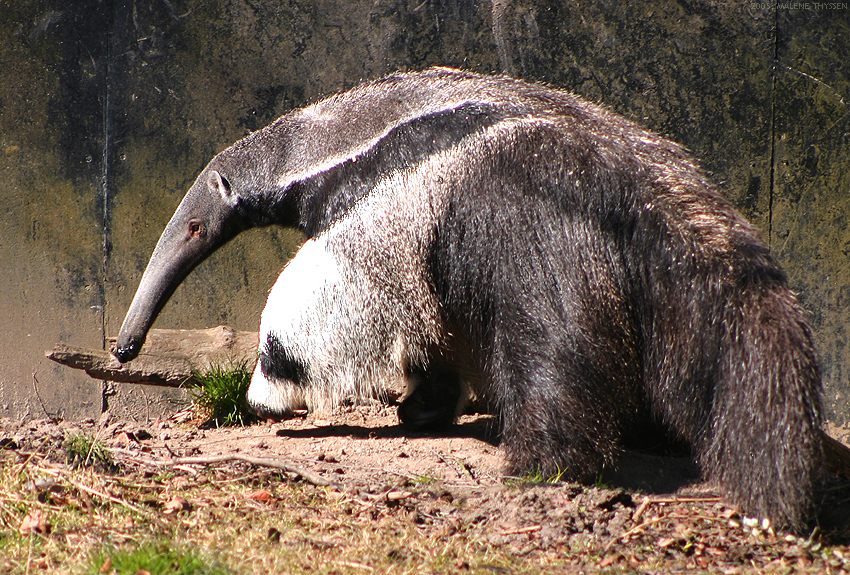
The Giant anteater is a host for G. echinodiscus
