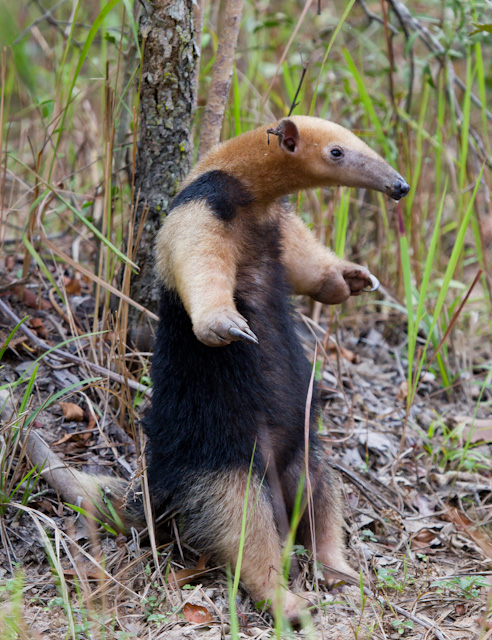
- In defensive posture

Conservation status
- Least Concern (IUCN 3.1)

Scientific classification
- Kingdom: Animalia
- Phylum: Chordata
- Class: Mammalia
- Order: Pilosa
- Family: Myrmecophagidae
- Genus: Tamandua
- Species: T. tetradactyla

Binomial name
- Tamandua tetradactyla (Linnaeus, 1758)
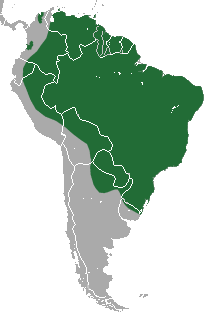
- Southern tamandua range

Synonyms
- Myrmecophaga tetradactyla Linnaeus, 1758; Myrmecophaga longicaudata Turner, 1853; Myrmecophaga tamandua G. Cuvier, 1798; Tamandua bivittata subsp. opisthomelas Gray, 1873; Tamandua longicaudata subsp. nigra Beaux, 1908

= Southern tamandua =

Species of anteater

The southern tamandua (Tamandua tetradactyla), also called the collared anteater or lesser anteater, is a species of anteater from South America and the island of Trinidad in the Caribbean. It is a solitary animal found in many habitats, from mature to highly disturbed secondary forests and arid savannas. It feeds on ants, termites, and bees. Its very strong foreclaws can be used to break insect nests and to defend itself.

== Distribution and habitat ==
The southern tamandua is found in Trinidad and throughout South America from Venezuela to northern Argentina, southern Brazil, and Uruguay at elevations up to 1,600 m (5,200 ft). It inhabits both wet and dry forests, including tropical rainforest, savanna, and thorn scrub. It seems to be most common in habitats near streams and rivers, especially those thick with vines and epiphytes (presumably because its prey is common in these areas).

The oldest fossil tamanduas date from the Pleistocene of South America, although genetic evidence suggests they may have diverged from their closest relative, the giant anteater, in the late Miocene, 12.9 million years ago.

=== Subspecies ===
The four recognised subspecies of Tamandua tetradactyla are:

- T. t. tetradactyla (Linnaeus, 1758): southern and eastern Brazil, Uruguay
- T. t. nigra (Geoffroy, 1803): northern Brazil, Colombia, Venezuela, Trinidad, the Guianas
- T. t. quichua (Thomas, 1927): Peru, Ecuador, extreme western Brazil
- T. t. straminea (Cope, 1889): southern Brazil, Paraguay, Bolivia, Argentina

== Description ==
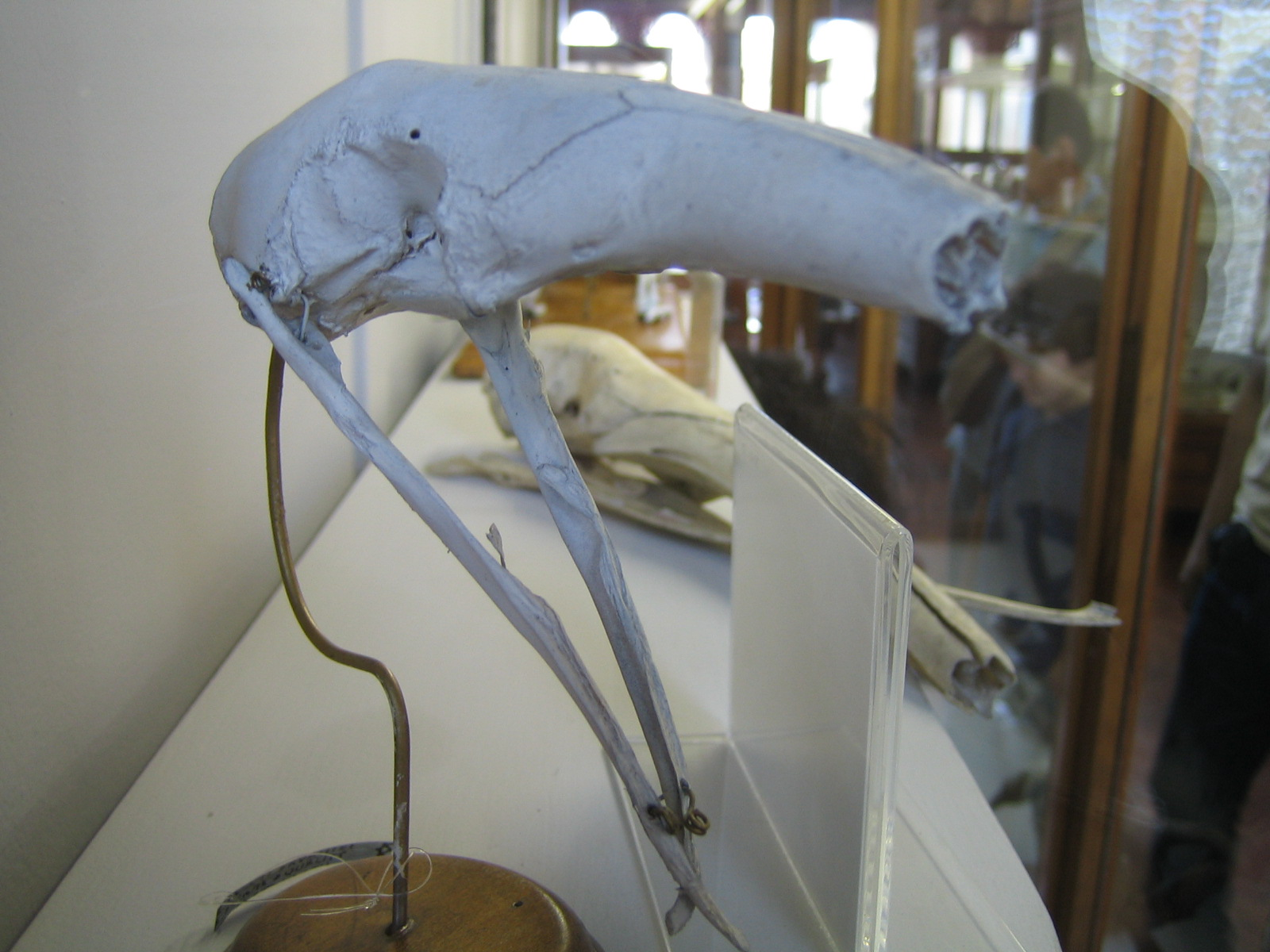
Skull

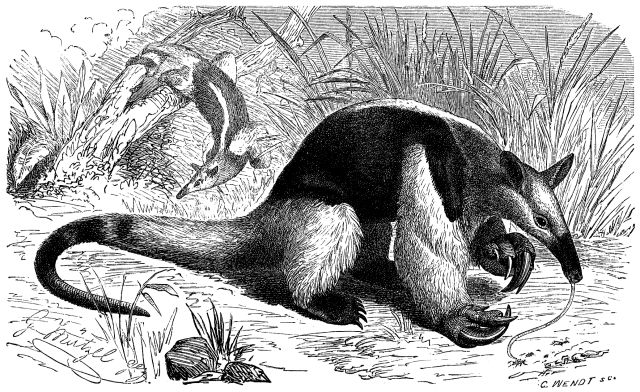
Tamandua by C. Wendt after Gustav Mützel, for Brehms Tierleben, 1887

The southern tamandua is a medium-sized anteater, though it can vary considerably in size based on environmental conditions. It has a head and body length ranging from 34 to 88 cm (13 to 35 in), and a prehensile tail 37 to 67 cm (15 to 26 in) long. Adults weigh from 1.5 to 8.4 kg (3.3 to 18.5 lb), with no significant difference in size between males and females. Like their close relative, the northern tamandua, they have four-clawed digits on the forefeet and five on the hind feet and walk on the outer surfaces of their forefeet to avoid puncturing their palms with their sharp claws. The underside and the tip of the tail are hairless, in order to help them climb and hang onto branches. The snout is long and decurved with an opening only as wide as the diameter of a stick, from which the tongue is protruded. Although some differences in the shape of the skull are seen, they can most easily be distinguished from the northern tamandua by their slightly longer ears, which average around 5 cm (2.0 in) instead of 4 cm (1.6 in), as in the northern species.

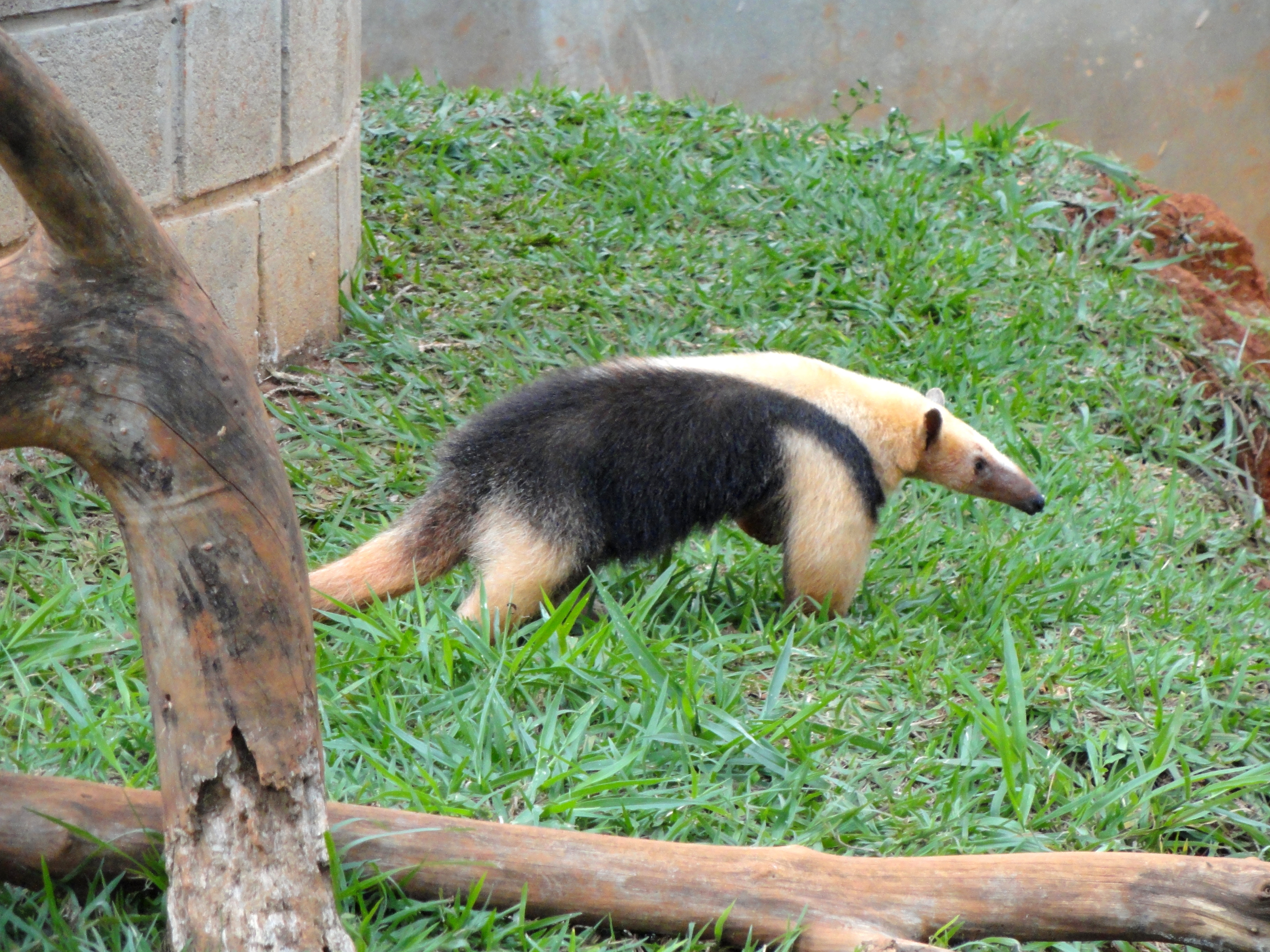
Southern tamandua (Tamandua tetradactyla) at Jardim Zoológico de Brasília, Brazil

The individual and geographic variation observed in the southern tamandua have made the taxonomic description of these animals a difficult task. Animals from the southeastern part of the range are "strongly vested", meaning they have black markings from shoulder to rump; the black patch widens near the shoulders and encircles the forelimbs. The rest of the body can be blonde, tan, or brown. Animals from northern Brazil and Venezuela to west of the Andes are solid blonde, brown, or black, or are only lightly vested. Individuals from Trinidad are almost always solid blonde.

== Reproduction ==
Females are polyestrous; mating generally takes place in the fall. The estrous cycle will last approximately about 42 days. Gestation ranges from 130 to 190 days. The female gives birth to one offspring per year. At birth, the young anteater does not resemble its parents; its coat varies from white to black. It rides on the mother's back for several months up to a year and is sometimes deposited on a safe branch while the mother forages.

== Behavior ==
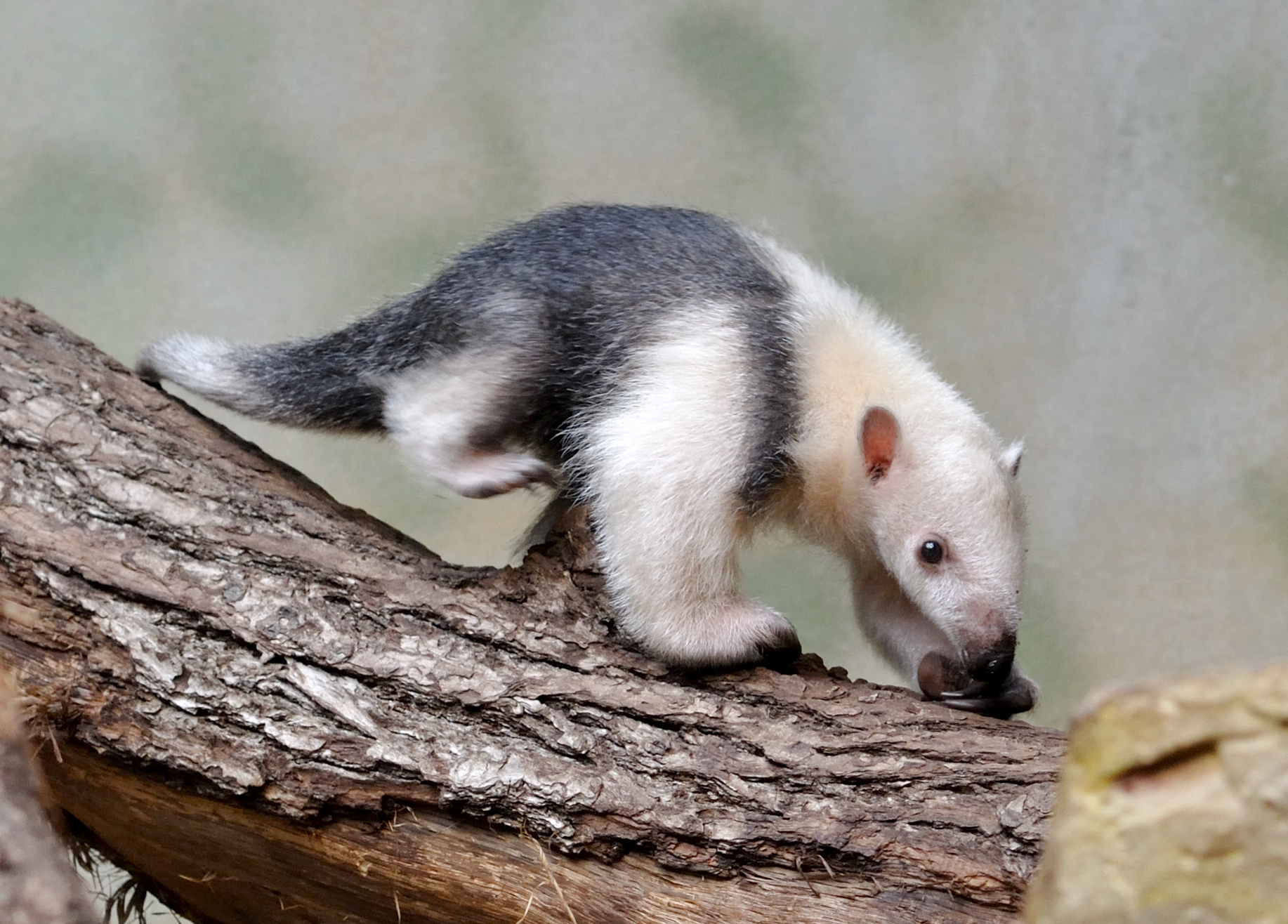
A cub in the Frankfurt Zoo

The tamandua is mainly nocturnal but is occasionally active during the day. The animals nest in hollow tree trunks or in the burrows of other animals, such as armadillos. They are solitary, occupying home ranges that average from 100 to 375 ha (250 to 930 acres), depending on the local environment.

They may communicate when aggravated by hissing and releasing an unpleasant scent from their anal glands. They spend much of their time foraging arboreally; a study in various habitats in Venezuela showed this anteater spends 13 to 64% of its time in trees. The southern tamandua is quite clumsy on the ground and ambles along, incapable of the gallop its relative, the giant anteater, can achieve.

The southern tamandua uses its powerful forearms in self-defense. If it is threatened in a tree it grasps a branch with its hindfeet and tail, leaving its arms and long, curved claws free for combat. If attacked on the ground, this anteater backs up against a rock or a tree and grabs the opponent with its forearms. In the rainforest, the southern tamandua is surrounded during the day by a cloud of flies and mosquitoes and is often seen wiping these insects from its eyes. This animal has small eyes and poor vision, but its large, upright ears indicate that hearing is an important sense.

The southern tamandua is a host of the acanthocephalan intestinal parasites Gigantorhynchus echinodiscus, Gigantorhynchus lopezneyrai, and Gigantorhynchus ungriai.

=== Diet ===
Southern tamanduas eat ants and termites in roughly equal proportions, although they may also eat a small quantity of fruit. They locate their food by scent, and prey on a wide range of species, including army ants, carpenter ants, and Nasutitermes. They avoid eating ants armed with strong chemical defenses, such as leafcutter ants. They also consume beetle larvae and their water requirement is obtained through their food. But as with the ants, beetles with a chemical defense are generally avoided. Evidence also suggests that southern tamanduas in captivity prefer termites over ants whilst Tamanduas examined in the wild consume a larger quantity of ants than termites. Anteaters extract their prey by using their extremely strong fore limbs to rip open nests and their elongated snouts and rounded tongues (up to 40 cm (16 in) in length) to lick up the insects. These tongues are adapted specifically for myrmecophagy thanks to specialized papillae that allow them to grab onto their tiny prey.

Although it has the same diet as the giant anteater, both animals are able to live alongside one another, perhaps because the southern tamandua is able to reach nests in trees, while its larger relative cannot. Another reason for this is that southern tamanduas often prefer to eat ants that get their food from the vegetation, as well as the soil, while giant anteaters look for ants that gather food in just the soil.

=== Predation ===
Potential predators of lesser anteaters in Serra da Bodoquena include large canids (such as the maned wolf), medium and large felids (such as cougars, jaguars and ocelots), large eagles (such as harpy eagles and crested eagles), and large boids (such as boa constrictors).

== Captivity ==
Tamandua in Paraguaná Zoological Park, Venezuela.

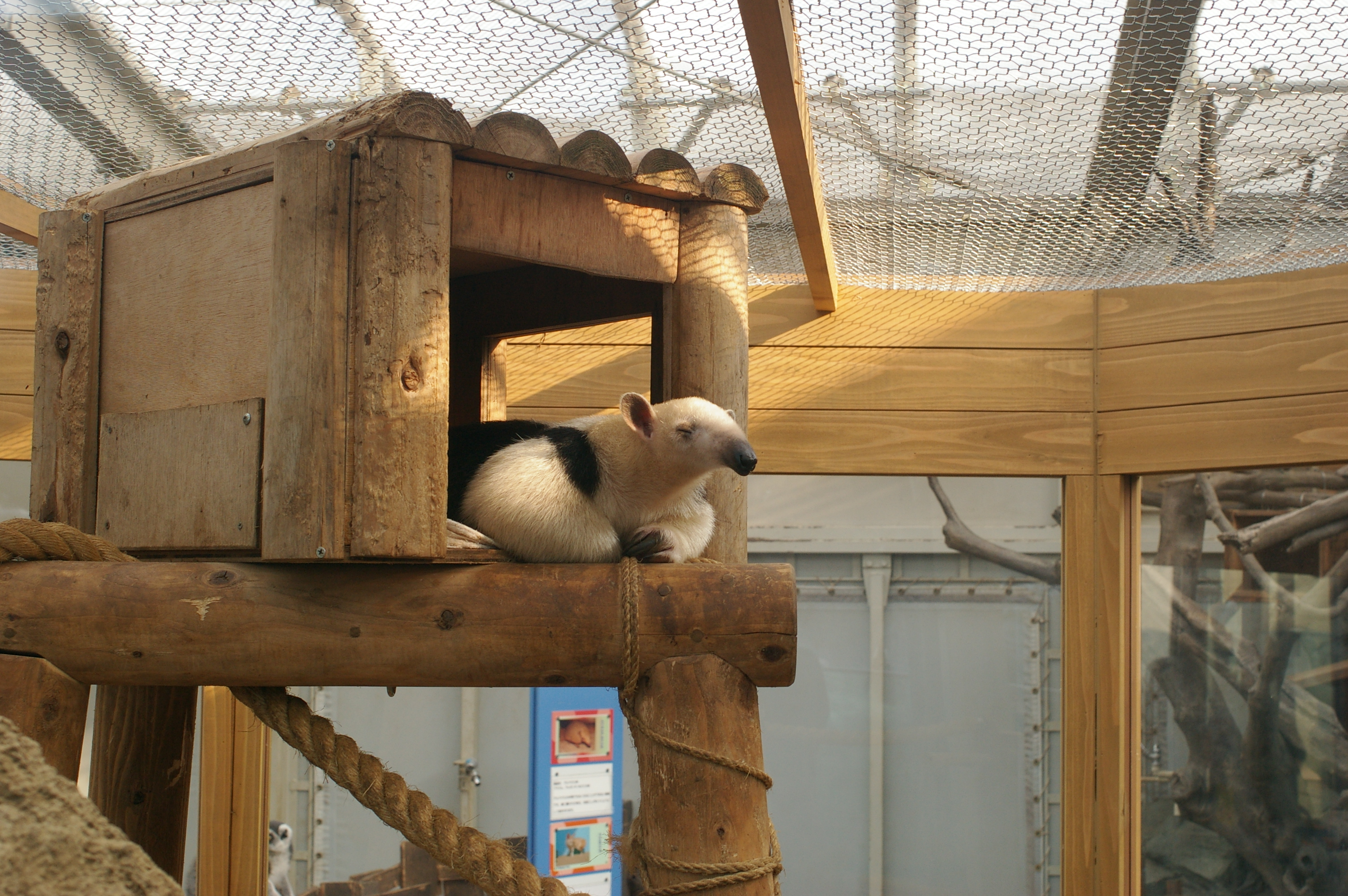
Southern tamandua at the Sunshine International Aquarium in Tokyo, Japan

While southern tamanduas are solitary creatures, they thrive in captivity when they live together in pairs. These interactions increase their motivation to search for food and to stay active.

Being housed with another tamandua can help, but there are still other factors of captivity that impact their behavior. Their interactions with the enclosure managers, as well as regular appointments to a veterinary clinic, can cause stress in the southern tamandua. This stress is often exhibited in their behavior and tends to be heightened in the summer.

== Conservation ==
Southern tamanduas are classified as Least Concern on the Conservation Status scale, but they still face many threatening situations. These threats can include wildfires, habitat loss, and hunters that use the tendons in the southern tamanduas' tails as a material for producing rope.

They are also used as pest control, specifically for termites and ants, by Indigenous people, who sometimes bring the southern tamanduas into their homes to take care of these insects.

== General sources ==
- Emmons, Louise H.; Feer, François (1997-09-02). Neotropical Rainforest Mammals: A Field Guide (2nd ed.). Chicago: University of Chicago Press. pp. 39–41. ISBN 978-0-226-20721-6. OCLC 44179508.
- Gorog, A. 1999. "Tamandua tetradactyla" from Animal Diversity Web.
