= Isla Damas =

Coordinates: 9.4539°N 84.2033°W

Isla Damas, or Damas Island, is a small (6 km^{2}) island in Costa Rica in the vicinity of Quepos district. It is particularly noted for its estuaries lined with mangroves. Fauna on the island include white-faced monkeys, sloths, green iguanas, crocodiles, spectacled caimans, boas, crab-eating raccoons and silky anteaters, as well as crabs and numerous bird species, such as: heron, pelicans. Boat and kayak tours through the island's estuaries are popular excursions with tourists staying in Quepos, Manuel Antonio National Park, or Jacó.

== Gallery ==
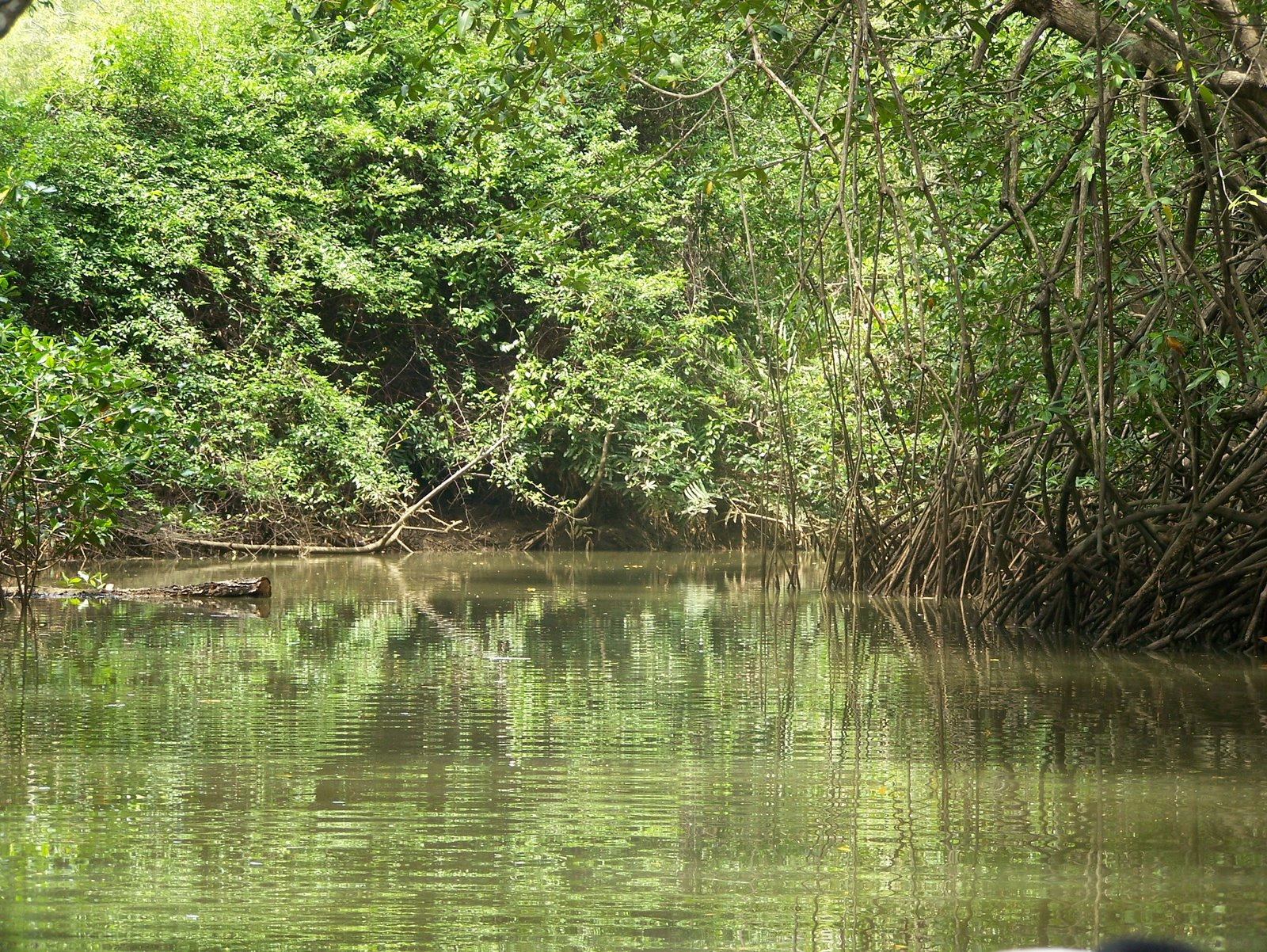
Mangrove-lined estuary, Isla Damas

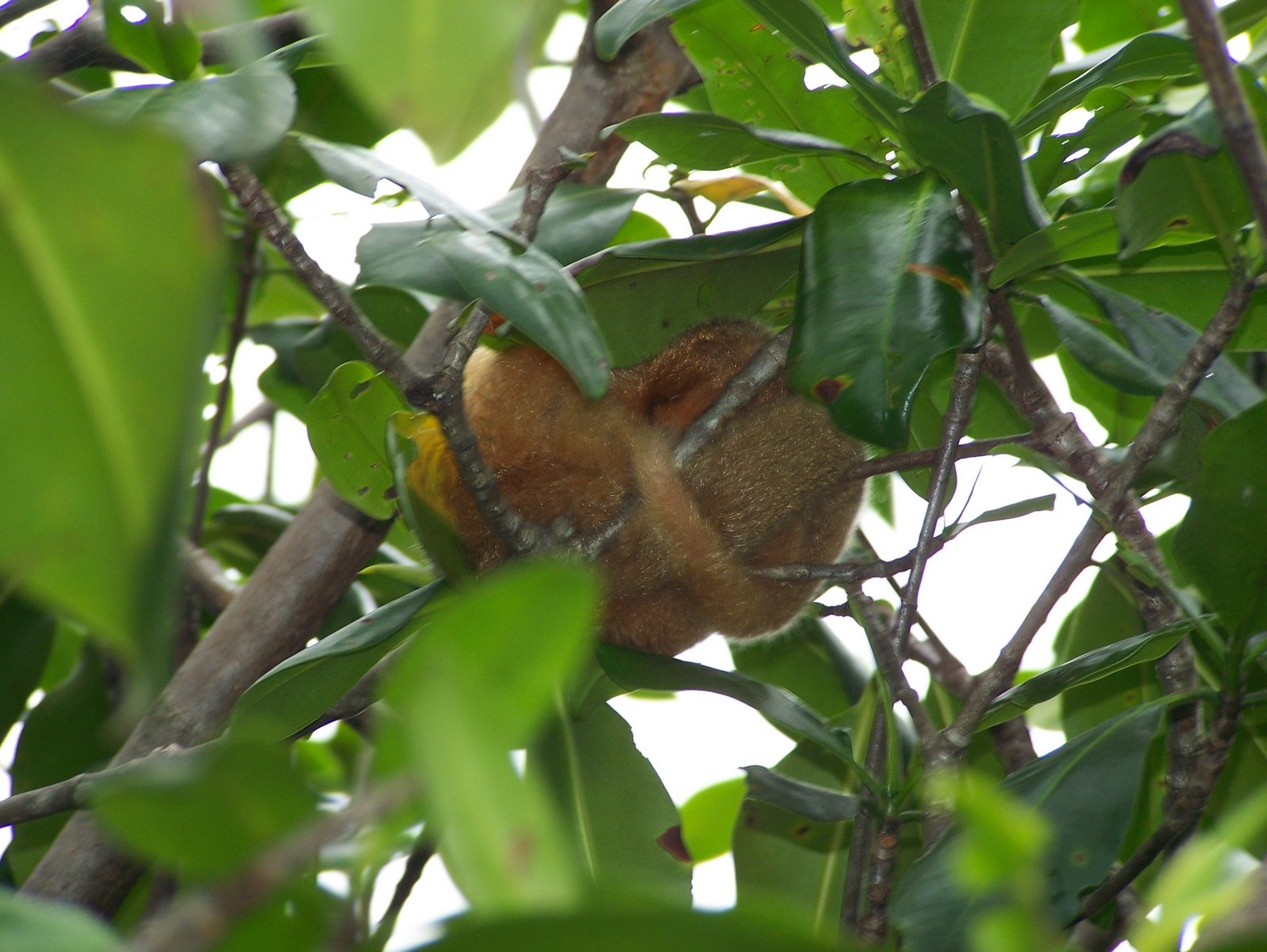
Silky anteater sleeping in Isla Damas

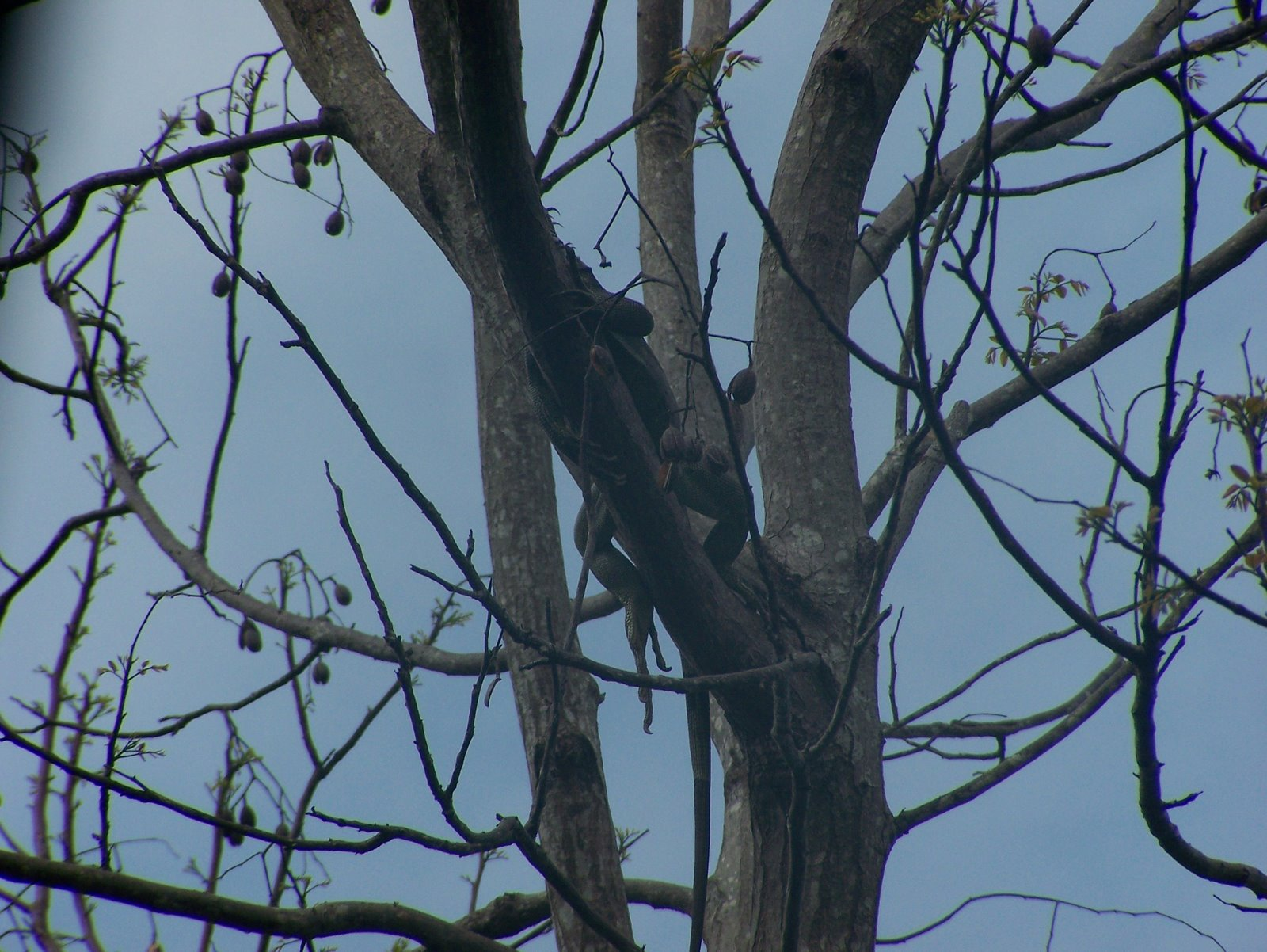
Green iguana in Isla Damas
