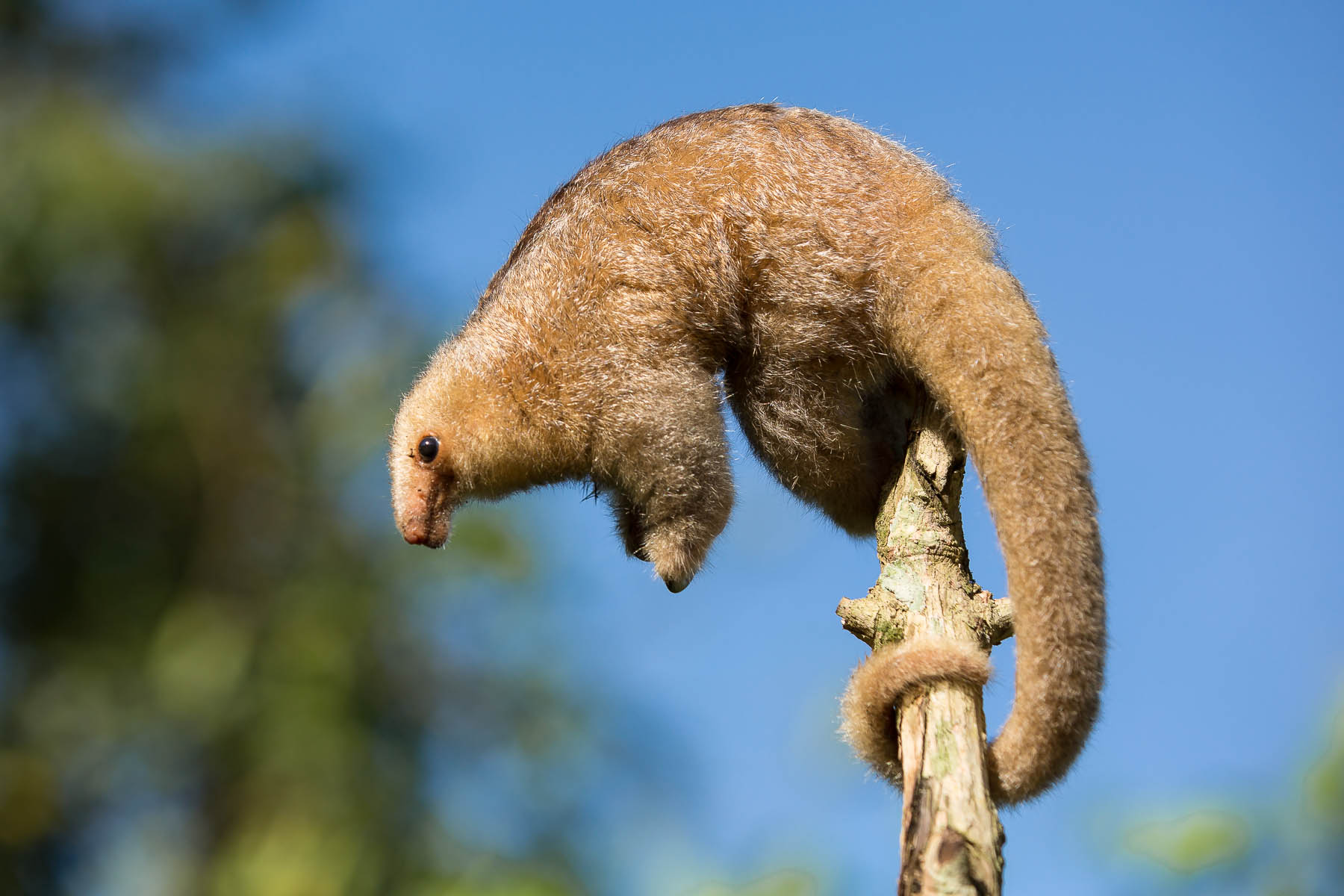

Conservation status
- Least Concern (IUCN 3.1)

Scientific classification
- Kingdom: Animalia
- Phylum: Chordata
- Class: Mammalia
- Order: Pilosa
- Family: Cyclopedidae
- Genus: Cyclopes
- Species: C. didactylus

Binomial name
- Cyclopes didactylus (Linnaeus, 1758)
- Cyclopes distribution C. didactylus in green

Synonyms
- Myrmecophaga didactyla Linnaeus, 1758

= Common silky anteater =

Species of mammals related to sloths and armadillos

The common silky anteater (Cyclopes didactylus), also known as the pygmy anteater, is a species of anteater in the genus Cyclopes. It has nocturnal habits and appears to be completely arboreal; its hind feet are highly modified for climbing. It was formerly considered the only member of Cyclopes until a taxonomic review in 2017, including both molecular and morphological evidence, found that Cyclopes may actually comprise at least seven species.
