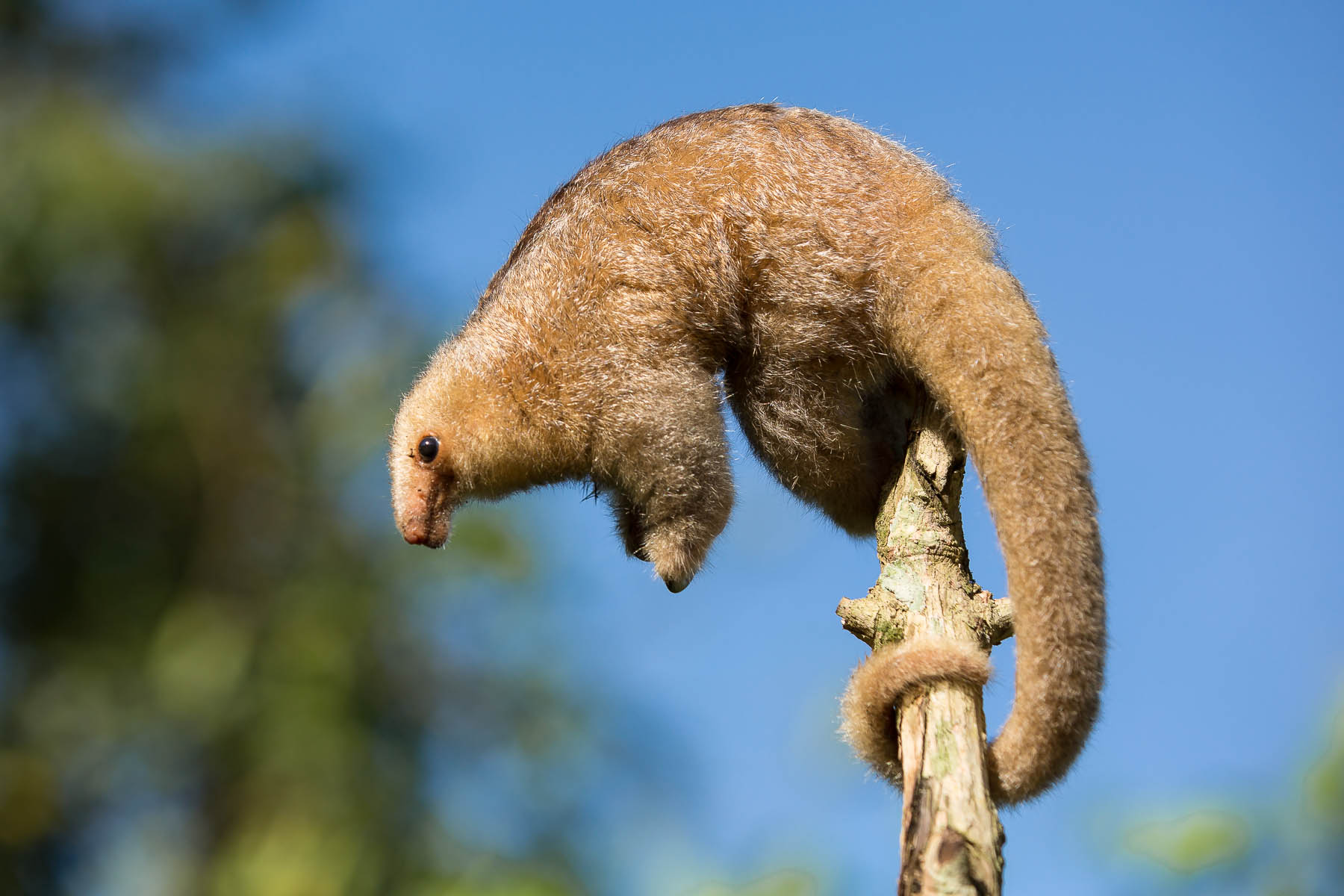

Scientific classification
- Kingdom: Animalia
- Phylum: Chordata
- Class: Mammalia
- Order: Pilosa
- Family: Cyclopedidae
- Genus: Cyclopes; J. E. Gray, 1821

Type species
- Cyclopes didactylus (Linnaeus, 1758)

Species
- Cyclopes didactylus

= Cyclopes (genus) =

Genus of mammals

Cyclopes is a genus of anteaters commonly called silky anteaters. Cyclopes is thought of as monotypic, consisting of just one species, the common silky anteater.

== Description ==
Silky anteaters are the smallest extant anteaters and have proportionately shorter faces and larger crania than other species. Average adult length ranges from 36 to 45 cm (14 to 18 in), including a tail 17 to 24 cm (6.7 to 9.4 in) long, and weigh from 175 to 400 g (6.2 to 14.1 oz). They have dense and soft fur, ranging from grey to yellowish in color, with a silvery sheen. Many subspecies have dark, often brownish, streaks and relatively paler underparts or limbs. Their eyes are black, while the foot soles are red.

The silky anteater possesses claws on the second and third toes of its forefeet, with the third toe being significantly larger. The fourth toe is small and clawless, while the remaining toes are vestigial or absent and not externally visible. On the hind feet, all four toes are of equal length and equipped with long claws, accompanied by a vestigial hallux that is not externally visible. The ribs are broad and flat, overlapping to form an internal armored casing that protects the chest.

The species also features partially prehensile tails, which further aid in their arboreal lifestyle.

== Distribution and habitat ==
Silky anteaters are found from Oaxaca and southern Veracruz in Mexico, through Central America (except El Salvador), and south to Ecuador, and northern Peru, Bolivia, and Brazil. A distinct population is found in the northern Atlantic Forest of eastern Brazil. Silky anteaters are also found on the island of Trinidad. They inhabit a range of different forest types, including semi-deciduous, tropical evergreen, and mangrove forests, from sea level to 1,500 m (4,900 ft).

== Systematics ==
Silky anteaters form the sister clade to the myrmecophagid anteaters, together forming Vermilingua. Vermilingua is a sister clade to sloths (Folivora), together forming Pilosa.

== Behavior ==
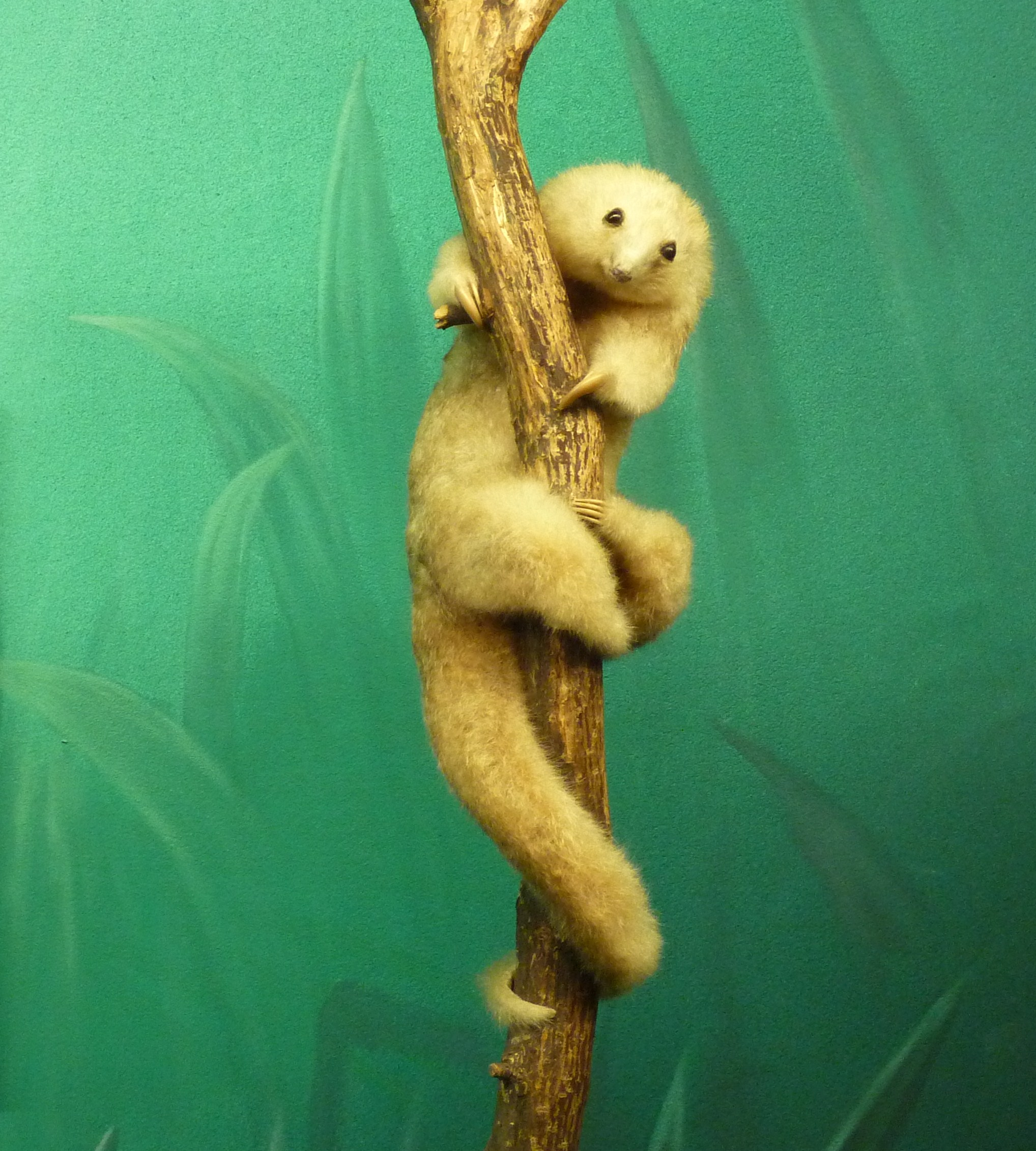
A mounted specimen from the Natural History Museum of Geneva

Silky anteaters are nocturnal and arboreal, found in lowland rainforests with continuous canopy, where they can move to different places without the need to descend from trees. They can occur at fairly high densities of 0.77 individuals/ha, for example, in some areas. Females have smaller home ranges than males.

The silky anteater is a slow-moving animal and feeds mainly on ants, eating between 700 and 5,000 a day. Silky anteaters also feed on wasps and wasp pupae, attacking the wasp nests at night when the wasps are sluggish and unable to defend themselves. Sometimes, it also feeds on other insects, such as termites and small coccinellid beetles. It has been observed to consume fruits while in captivity. The silky anteater defecates once a day. Some of those faeces contain a large quantity of exoskeleton fragments of insects, indicating the silky anteater does not possess either chitinase or chitobiase, digestive enzymes found in insectivorous bats.

It is a solitary animal and gives birth to a single young, up to twice a year. The young are born already furred, and with a similar colour pattern to the adults. They begin to take solid food when they are about one-third of the adult mass. The young is usually placed inside a nest of dead leaves built in tree holes, and left for about eight hours each night.

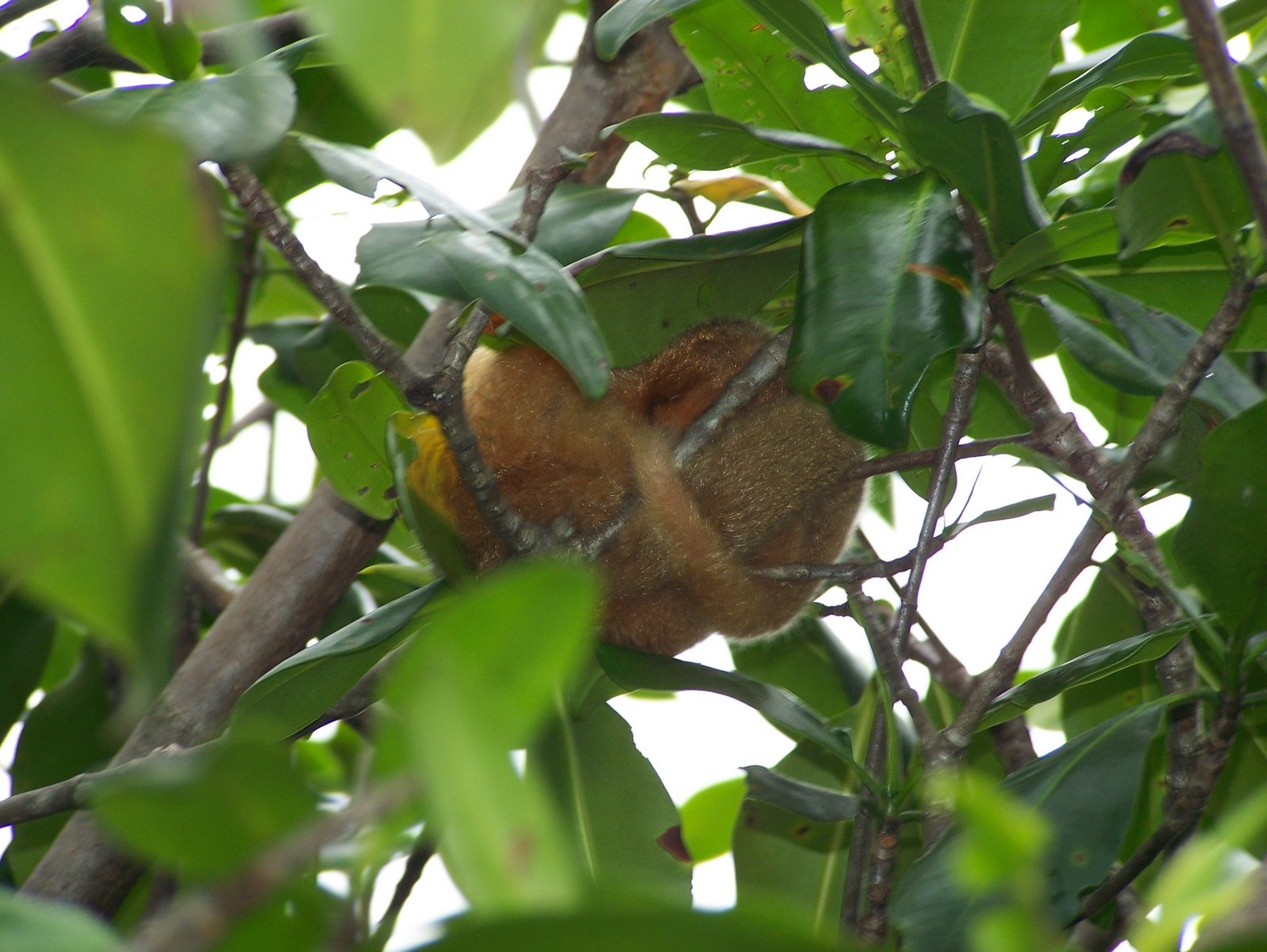
Silky anteater sleeping, Damas Island, Costa Rica

Some authors suggest the silky anteater usually dwells in silk cotton trees (genus Ceiba). Because of its resemblance to the seed pod fibers of these trees, it can use the trees as camouflage and avoid attacks of predators such as hawks and, especially, harpy eagles. During the day, they typically sleep curled up in a ball. Although they are rarely seen in the forest, they can be found more easily when they are foraging on lianas at night.

When threatened, the silky anteater, like other anteaters, defends itself by standing on its hind legs and holding its fore feet close to its face so it can strike any animal that tries to get close with its sharp claws.

The silky anteater is a host of the acanthocephalan intestinal parasite Gigantorhynchus echinodiscus.
