= Orthognathotermes heberi =

Scientific classification
- Domain: Eukaryota
- Kingdom: Animalia
- Phylum: Arthropoda
- Class: Insecta
- Order: Blattodea
- Infraorder: Isoptera
- Family: Termitidae
- Genus: Orthognathotermes
- Species: O. heberi

Binomial name
- Orthognathotermes heberi Raw & Egler, 1985

Species of anthropod

Orthognathotermes heberi is a species of termite found in Brazil.

== Taxonomy ==
The species is named after Heber Silva de Oliveira, who has contributed significantly to the protection of the Emas National Park, where it is found.

== Description ==
=== Morphology ===
Orthognathotermes heberi has an orange-yellow head capsule and clypeus, with ferruginous labrum, antennae, and labial and maxillary palps. The mandibles are black, merging to chestnut brown basally. The head is barrel-shaped when viewed from above, with sparse, short hairs on the head capsule. The labrum is trilobate, and the mandibles are somewhat asymmetrical, with the left mandible being two-thirds the length of the right one. Each mandible is elbowed outwards, with a sharp cutting edge and a stout, inwardly bent point. The basal portion of the left mandible is thicker than that of the right.

The species is primarily transparent, with off-white body and legs.

Specimens of O. heberi were initially described with a unique feature: a significant difference in soldier morphology, termed "major soldiers" and "minor soldiers" by the authors. This was later understood to be a result of parasitism by Acanthocephala, a fact that was not recognized by Raw & Egler in 1985. Subsequent research found similar parasites in other termite species, but their exact identity remains unknown. A 2009 revision clarified that the "minor soldiers" were actually individuals infested by an unidentified species of Acanthocephala, indicating that the soldier caste is monomorphic.

O. heberi is most similar morphologically to O. gibberorum and can be distinguished by several key characteristics. O. gibberorum has a deeper sagittal furrow down the back of the head, a more orange head capsule, less bulging and more tapering sides of the head, and yellow-white tergal bristles, among other differences.

== Distribution ==
All documented occurrences of O. heberi are in open landscapes, such as pastures and cerrados.

== Behavior and ecology ==
=== Nests ===
The species builds subconical nests, up to 25 cm high and 50 cm in diameter, often covered with loose soil particles and grass. These nests are commonly found in the grasslands near the park's main building. O. heberi can also occupy nests built by other termite species, such as Cornitermes cumulans.
