= Juracanthocephalus =

Juracanthocephalus Temporal range: Middle Jurassic (Callovian), 165 Ma

Scientific classification
- Kingdom: Animalia
- Phylum: Acanthocephala
- Genus: †Juracanthocephalus; Luo et al., 2025
- Species: †J. daohugouensis

Binomial name
- †Juracanthocephalus daohugouensis Luo et al., 2025

Extinct genus of thorny-headed worms

Juracanthocephalus is an extinct, monospecific genus of stem-group acanthocephalan (thorny-headed worm) that lived in the Jiulongshan Formation during the Callovian age of the Middle Jurassic, 165 Ma.

It shares features with both Seisonidea and Acanthocephala, suggesting they are sister groups, with Juracanthocephalus being a transitional form between the two.

The type and only species is Juracanthocephalus daohugouensis.

== Phylogeny ==
In its initial description, Juracanthocephalus was recovered as a stem-acanthocephalan within the Rotifera. Cladogram after Luo et al. 2025.

- Gnathifera
  - Gnathostomulida
  - - Micrognathozoa
    - Rotifera/Syndermata
      - Bdelloidea
      - Monogononta
      - Pararotatoria
        - Seisonidea
        - Acanthocephala sensu lato
          - †Juracanthocephalus
          - Acanthocephala
