= Philodinavidae =

Scientific classification
- Kingdom: Animalia
- Phylum: Rotifera
- Class: Bdelloidea
- Order: Bdelloida
- Family: Philodinavidae

Family of rotifers

Philodinavidae is a family of rotifers belonging to the order Bdelloidea.

Genera:

- Abrochtha Bryce, 1910
- Henoceros Milne, 1916
- Philodinavus Harring, 1913
