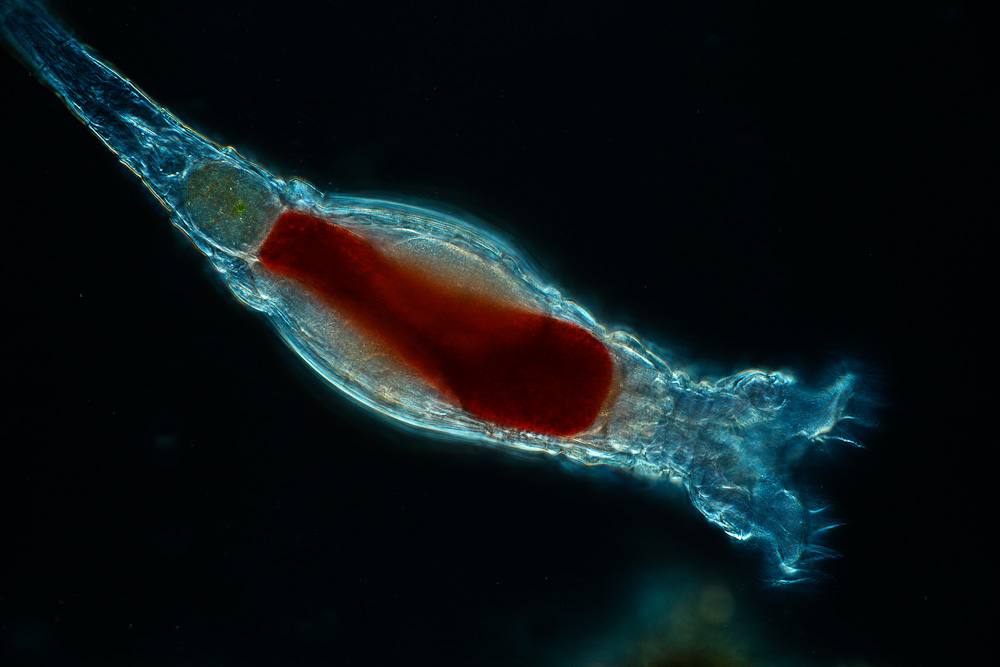
- Rotifer
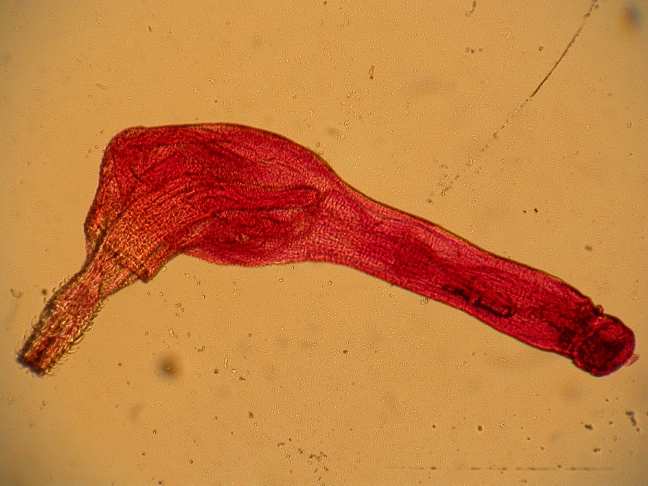
- Acanthocephalan

Scientific classification (disputed)
- Kingdom: Animalia
- Clade: Gnathifera
- Clade: Syndermata; Zrzavý, 1998

Phyla
- Acanthocephala; Rotifera

Synonyms
- Trochata Cavalier-Smith, 1998

= Syndermata =

Clade of animals

Syndermata or Trochata is a clade of animals that, in some systems, is considered synonymous with Rotifera. Older systems separate Rotifera and Acanthocephala as different phyla, and group them both under Syndermata. This clade is placed in the Gnathifera.

== Phylogeny ==
Phylogenetic analysis of the 18S ribosomal gene has revealed that the Acanthocephala, formerly considered a separate phylum are most closely related to the rotifers. They are possibly closer to the two rotifer classes Bdelloidea and Monogononta than to the other class, Seisonidea, producing the names and relationships shown in the cladogram below.

- - Syndermata
    - Seisonida
    - - Eurotatoria
        - Bdelloidea
        - Monogononta
      - Acanthocephala

A study of the gene order in the mitochondria suggests that Seisonidea and Acanthocephala are sister clades and that the Bdelloidea are the sister clade to this group. This has since been corroborated by the discovery of a fossil stem-group acanthocephalan.
