= Polyacanthorhynchus =

Scientific classification
- Kingdom: Animalia
- Phylum: Acanthocephala
- Class: Polyacanthocephala; Amin, 1987
- Order: Polyacanthorhynchida; Golvan, 1956
- Family: Polyacanthorhynchidae; Golvan, 1956
- Genus: Polyacanthorhynchus; Travassos, 1920

Genus of thorny-headed worms

Polyacanthorhynchidae is a family of parasitic worms from the phylum Acanthocephala. It contains a single genus Polyacanthorhynchus.

== Taxonomy ==
Phylogenetic analysis has found that polyacanthocephala represents a distinct class of acanthocephalans.

== Species ==
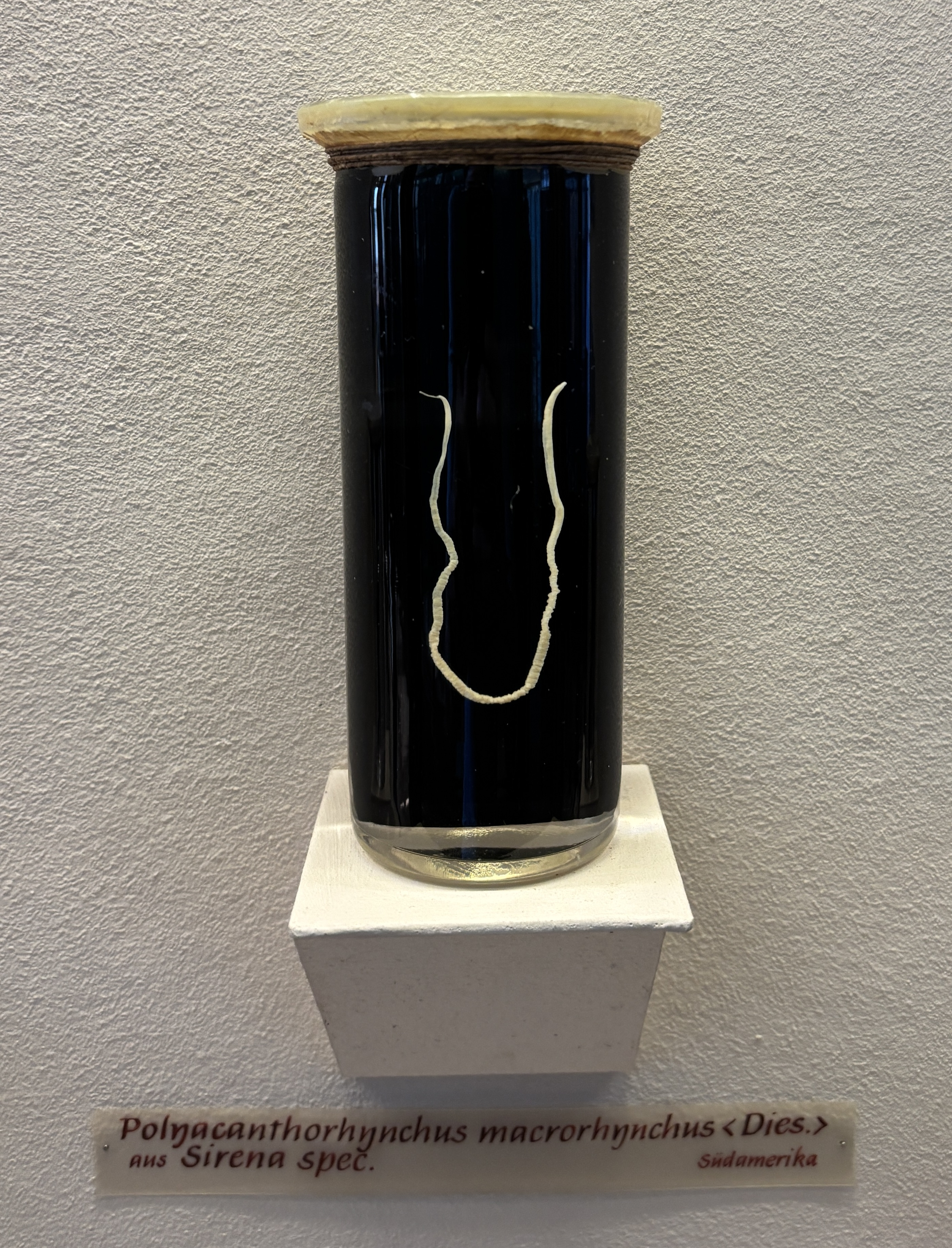
Polyacanthorhynchus macrorhynchus

There are four species in the genus Polyacanthorhynchus. (Note: A binomial authority in parentheses indicates that the species was originally described in a genus other than the present genus.)

- Polyacanthorhynchus caballeroi Diaz-ungria and Rodrigo, 1960

The complete genome of the mitochondria has been determined. P. caballeroi infect South American caimans.

- Polyacanthorhynchus echiyensis
- Polyacanthorhynchus kenyensis Schmidt and Canaris, 1967

P. kenyensis has been found infecting three freshwater teleosts: the Blue spotted tilapia (Oreochromis leucostictus), the Redbelly tilapia (Tilapia zillii), and the Largemouth bass (Micropterus salmoidein) in Lake Naivasha, Kenya. Samples were found in the liver of Tilapia and Orechromis and free in the body cavity in Micropterus It is the newest

- Polyacanthorhynchus macrorhynchus (Diesing, 1856)

P. macrorhynchus infect South American caimans.

- Polyacanthorhynchus nigerianus
- Polyacanthorhynchus rhopalorhynchus (Diesing, 1851)

Pirarucu collected in August 2004 from Araguaia River were found to have high prevalence values of P. rhopalorhynchus in their intestines. Cystacanths of P. rhopalorhynchus also have been found in the viscera of Hoplias malabaricus from Moca Vie River, Las Palquitas, Bolivia. Cystacanths were not deeply embedded in liver tissue but in a collagenous connective tissue capsule surrounded and attached to the liver surface. Necrosis of hepatocytes and subsequent inflammatory response were observed near encapsulated P. rhopalorhynchus. P. rhopalorhynchus infect South American caimans. Cyscanaths had: The number of proboscis hook rows was 16–18 posteriorly gradually decreasing in size. There are 8–10 circles of anterior cuticular trunk spines with about 34–40 minute spines each. Lemnisci not pronounced. Male cystacanths were 1.985–2.978 mm long by 397–662 wide significantly smaller than the size of adult males of 40–55 mm long. Females are larger with female cystacanths were 2.445–2.813 mm long by 430–496 wide significantly smaller than the size of adult males of 50–70 mm long. Male cystacanth proboscis (1.430–1.690 mm long by 169–208 wide) were smaller than female cystacanth proboscis (1.196–1.430 mm long by 169–208 wide). Male cystacanth proboscis receptacle (0.611–1.105 mm long by 130–195 wide) were also smaller than the female cystacanth proboscis receptacle (780–845 long by 156–195 wide).

== Hosts ==
Polyacanthorhynchus species parasitize fish and caimans.

Hosts for Polyacanthorhynchus species

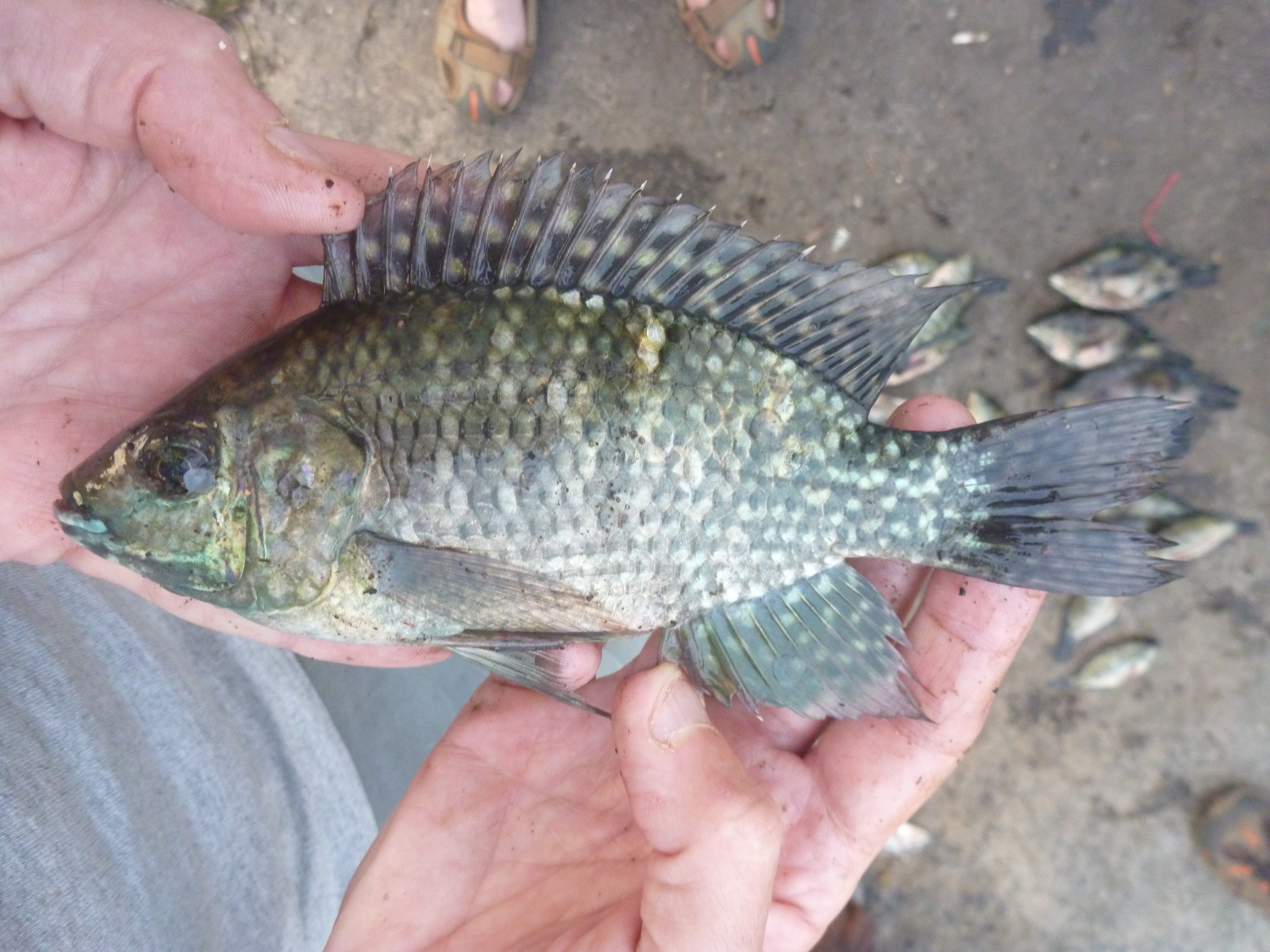
The Blue spotted tilapia is one of the hosts of P. kenyensis

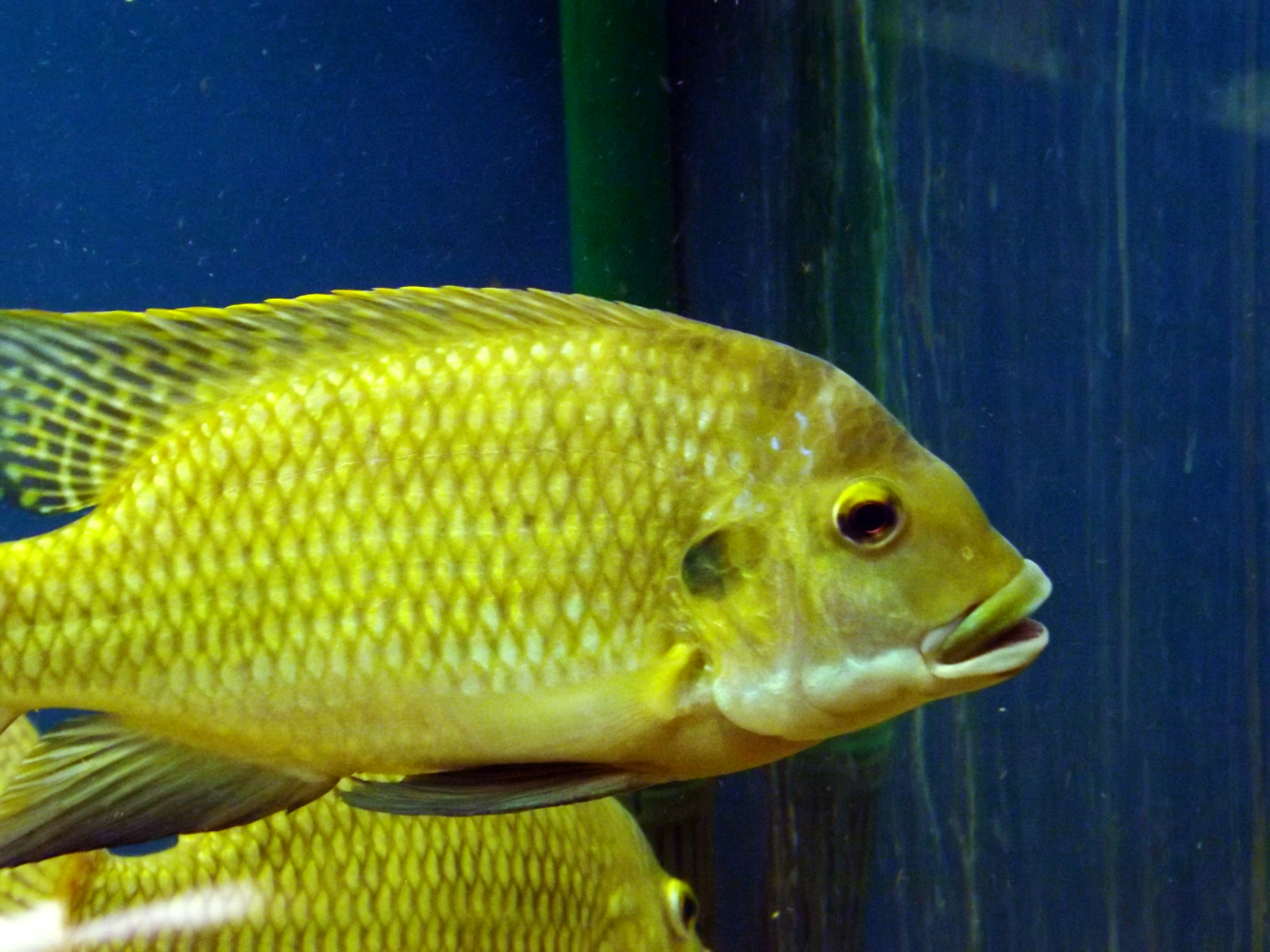
The Redbelly tilapia is one of the hosts of P. kenyensis

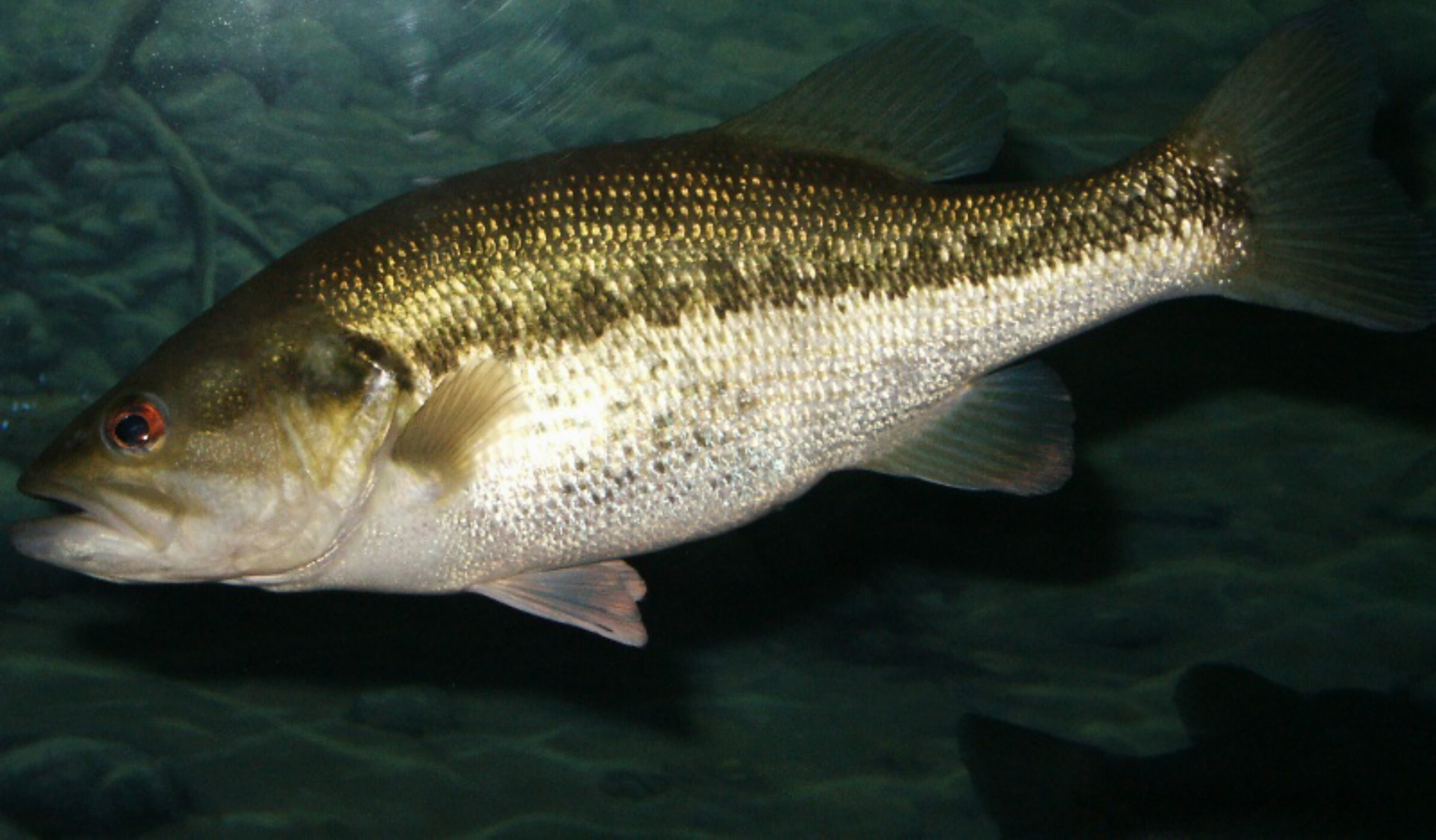
The Largemouth bass is one of the hosts of P. kenyensis

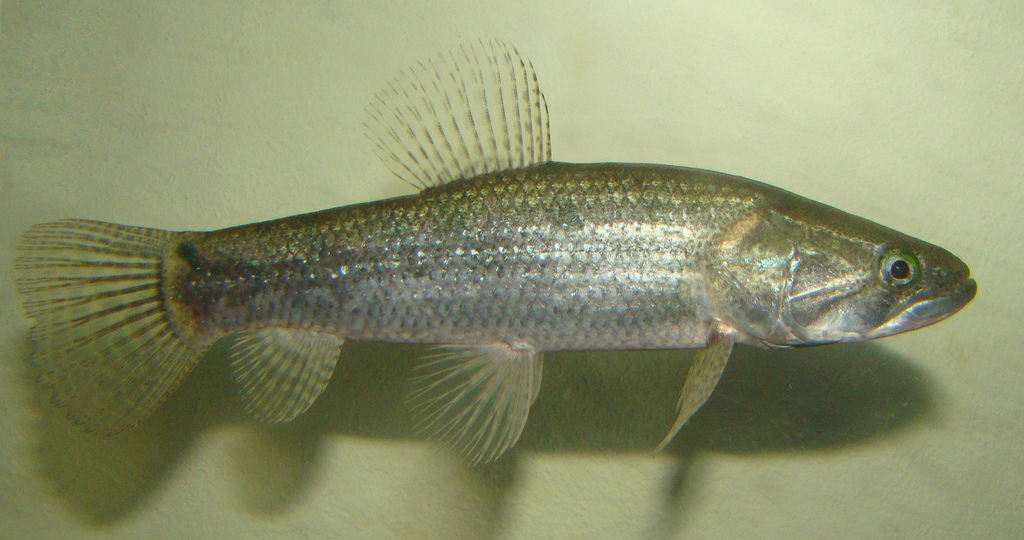
Hoplias malabaricus is one of the hosts of P. rhopalorhynchus
