= Acanthocephaliasis =

Acanthocephaliasis is a human disease caused by parasitic worms in the phylum Acanthocephala. They rarely infect humans. The worms' typical definitive hosts are racoons, rats, and swine, but it can survive in humans. Macracanthorhynchus hirudinaceus, Macracanthorhynchus ingens, Moniliformis moniliformis, Acanthocephalus rauschi, Pseudoacanthocephalus bufonis, and Corynosoma strumosum are the species commonly found in humans.

It is acquired through consuming raw beetles or cockroaches, including the insect's larvae. The parasite is widely distributed, but cases tend to occur where insects are eaten commonly. Once ingested by a human, the worms will find their way to the intestine and mature. There are severe symptoms due to the mechanical disruption of the lumen. Abdominal pain is common. Acanthocephaliasis can be diagnosed by the presence of eggs in the stool.

There is no standardized treatment, but there has been some success with pyrantel pamoate, levamisole, niclosamide, mebendazole, ivermectin, paracetamol, tiabendazole, and piperazine citrate. It is an uncommon condition, and literature on the topic in the field is sparse.
