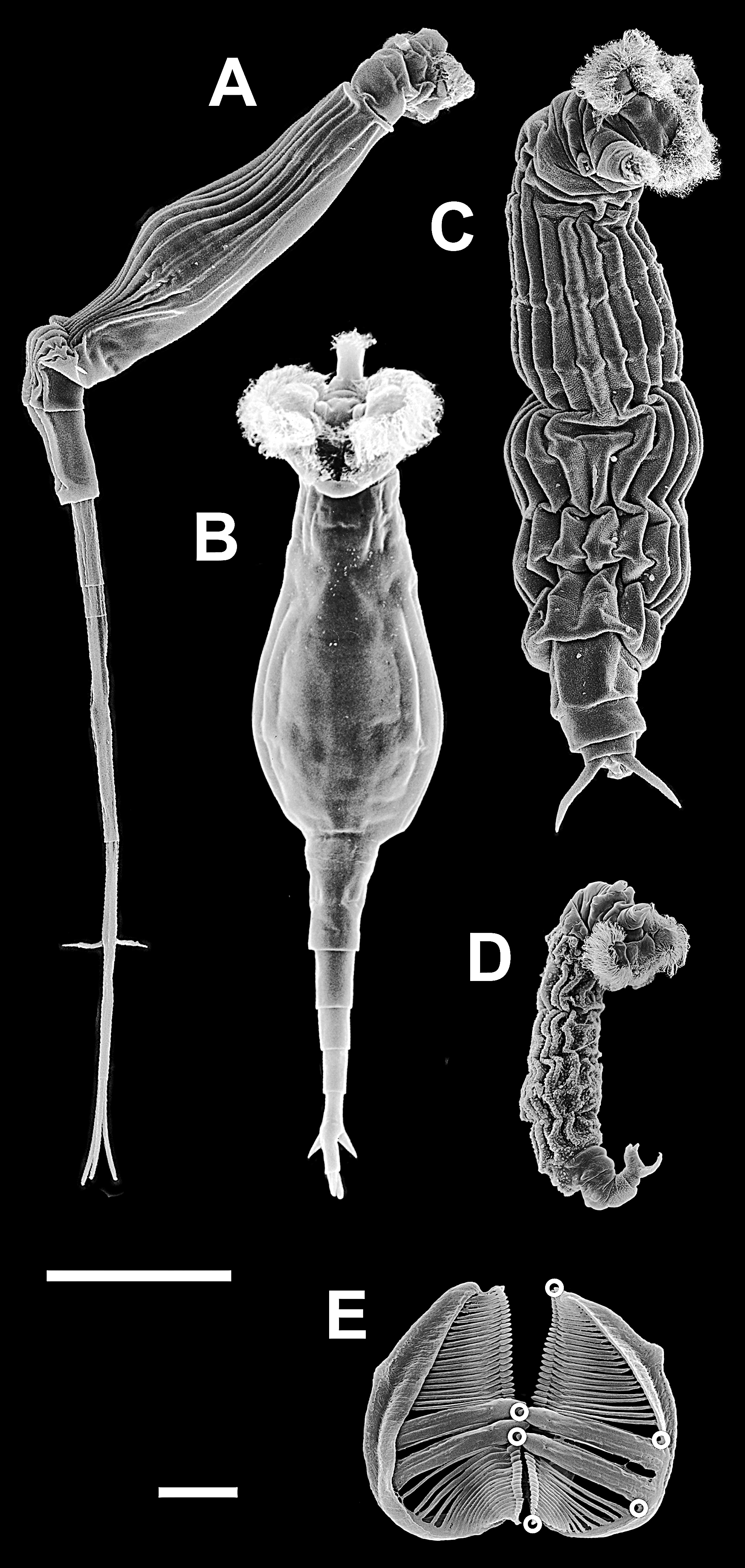
- (A) R. neptunia, lateral view; (B) R. macrura, ventral view; (C) R. tardigrada, dorsal view; (D) R. sordida, lateral view; and (E) trophi of R. tardigrada

Scientific classification
- Domain: Eukaryota
- Kingdom: Animalia
- Phylum: Rotifera
- Class: Bdelloidea
- Order: Bdelloida
- Family: Philodinidae
- Genus: Rotaria; Scopoli, 1777

Species
- Rotaria citrina Rotaria macrura Rotaria magnacalcarata Rotaria neptunia Rotaria neptunoida Rotaria rotatoria Rotaria socialis Rotaria sordida Rotaria tardigrada Rotaria sp. CWB-2005

Synonyms
- Rotifer vulgaris = Rotaria rotatoria

= Rotaria =

Genus of rotifers

Rotaria is a genus of asexual, microscopic animal known as a bdelloid rotifer. Analysis published in 2007 of morphology and DNA sequence data of species from the genus confirmed that despite their asexual mechanism of reproduction, two fundamental properties of species, independent evolution and ecological divergence by natural selection occurred. This demonstrates that sex is not a necessary condition for speciation.
