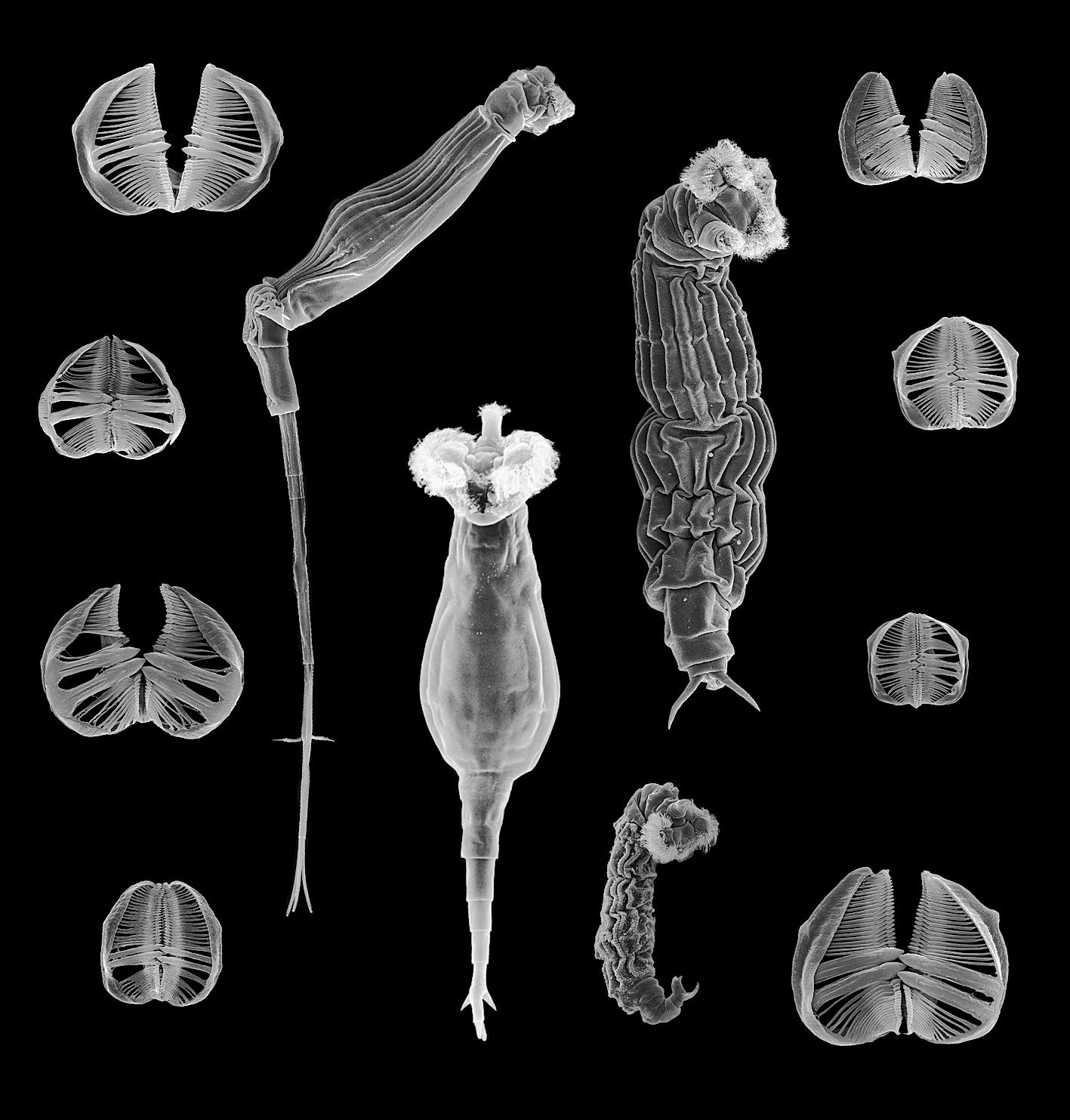
- SEM of Rotaria showing morphological variation of bdelloid rotifers and their jaws

Scientific classification
- Kingdom: Animalia
- Phylum: Rotifera
- Superclass: Eurotatoria
- Class: Bdelloidea; Hudson, 1884

Synonyms
- Bdelloida

= Bdelloidea =

Bdelloid rotifers Temporal range: Miocene–present

Class of parthenogenetic freshwater rotifers

Bdelloidea (/ˈdɛlɔɪdiə/; from Greek βδέλλα, bdella 'leech') is a class of rotifers found in freshwater habitats all over the world. There are over 450 described species of bdelloid rotifers (or bdelloids), distinguished from each other mainly on the basis of morphology. The main characteristics that distinguish bdelloids from related groups of rotifers are exclusively parthenogenetic reproduction and the ability to survive in dry, harsh environments by entering a state of desiccation-induced dormancy (anhydrobiosis) at any life stage. They are often referred to as "ancient asexuals" due to their unique asexual history that spans back to over 25 million years ago through fossil evidence. Bdelloid rotifers are microscopic organisms, typically between 150 and 700 μm in length. Most are slightly too small to be seen with the naked eye, but appear as tiny white dots through even a weak hand lens, especially in bright light. In June 2021, biologists reported the restoration of bdelloid rotifers after being frozen for 24,000 years in the Siberian permafrost.

== Evolutionary relationships ==
The phylum Rotifera traditionally included three classes: Bdelloidea, Monogononta and Seisonidea. Prior to 1990, phylogenetic studies based on morphology seemed to indicate that the sister group to bdelloid rotifers was Monogononta, with seisonid rotifers as an early-diverging outgroup.

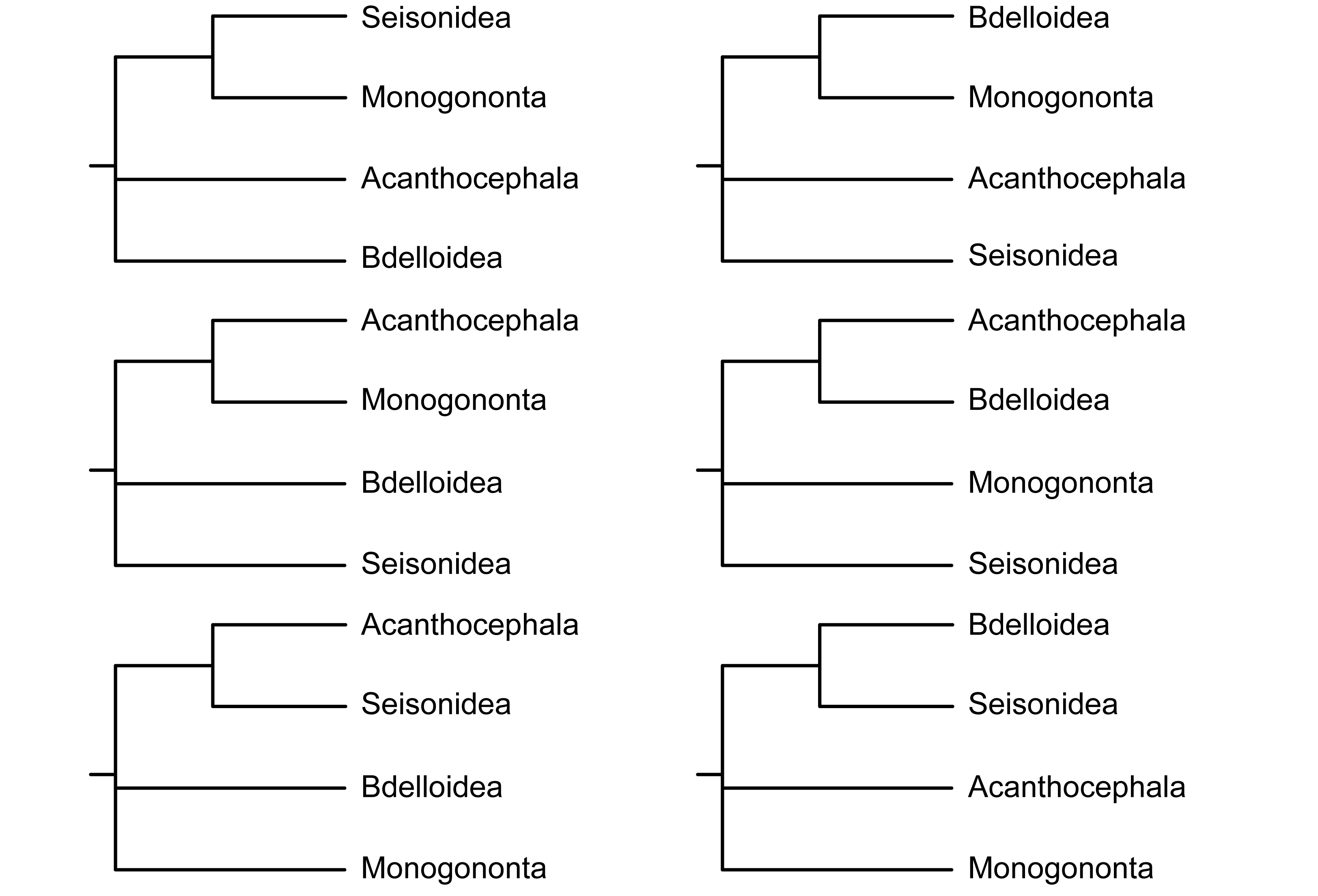
Cladograms showing alternative possible relationships within Syndermata (or Rotifera). Transcriptome results published in 2014 support a refined version of the scenario in the bottom left, with Bdelloidea as a sister group to Seisonidea + Acanthocephala, and Monogononta as an outgroup. Cladograms modified from Fig. 3, Lasek-Nesselquist 2012.

Modern molecular phylogenetic studies demonstrate that this classic understanding of 'Rotifera' is incomplete (paraphyletic), because it omits a fourth clade of closely related organisms: the Acanthocephala, or thorny-headed worms. Originally classified as a separate phylum, molecular and morphological evidence accumulated between 1994 and 2014 to indicate that Acanthocephala forms a monophyletic group with Bdelloidea, Monogononta and Seisonidea. To accommodate this finding, some authors extend the term 'Rotifera' to include the highly modified, parasitic 'acanthocephalan rotifers' alongside bdelloid, monogonont and seisonid rotifers. Others refer to the grouping of the four taxa as Syndermata, a term derived from their shared syncytial epidermis.

The position of Bdelloidea within Syndermata (or Rotifera) is not entirely clear. Alternative possible phylogenetic relationships within the clade are illustrated by the accompanying cladograms. As of 2014, the "most comprehensive phylogenomic analysis of syndermatan relationships" to date was based on transcriptome data from all four groups, and provided "strong support" for the hypothesis illustrated in the bottom left of the figure, in which Seisonidea and Acanthocephala are sister taxa. The study further indicated that the sister group to this taxon is Bdelloidea, whereas Monogononta is the outgroup to all three. This would mean that the closest living relatives of bdelloid rotifers are not monogonont rotifers, as previously believed, but seisonid rotifers and acanthocephalans, despite their highly modified morphology.

== Classification and identification ==
A 2016 phylogenetic analysis of the gene order in the mitochondria suggests that Seisonidea and Acanthocephala are sister clades and that the Eurotatoria are the sister clade to this group, producing the cladogram below.

- - Syndermata
    - Seisonida
    - Acanthocephala
  - Eurotatoria
    - Bdelloidea
    - Monogononta

Bdelloidea is a class of the phylum Rotifera, consisting of three orders: Philodinavida, Philodinida and Adinetida. These orders are divided into four families and about 450 species. Since these organisms are asexual the usual definition of a species as a group of organisms capable of creating fertile offspring is inapplicable, therefore the species concept in these organisms is based on a mixture of morphological and molecular data instead. DNA studies suggest that the diversity is much greater than the original morphological classifications suggest.

Bdelloids can only be identified by eye while they are alive because many of the characteristics significant to classification are related to feeding and crawling; however, genetic identification of bdelloids is possible on dead individuals. Once preserved, the individuals contract into "blobs" which restricts analysis. There are currently three morphological identification methodologies, two of which are considered dated: Bartoš (1951) and Donner (1965). The third method is a diagnostic key developed in 1995 by Shiel.

=== Morphology ===
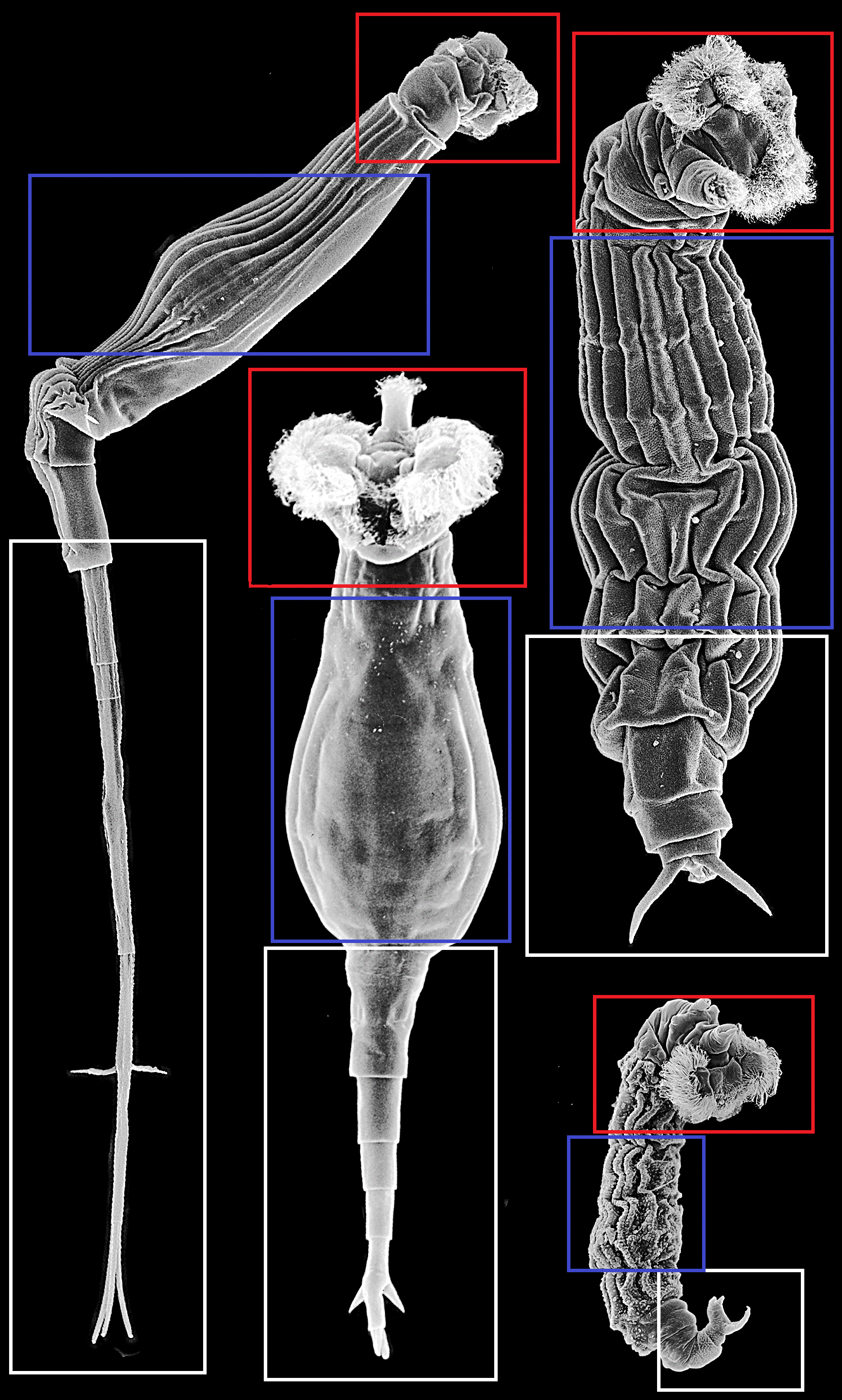
Figure 1: SEM pictures of some species of the genus Rotaria with head (red), tail (white) and trunk (blue) areas highlighted

There are three main regions of the body of bdelloids: head, trunk and foot. The adjacent image depicts each area to show how body parts can be very different although they are named the same depending on the species involved. Bdelloids typically have a well-developed corona, divided into two parts, on a retractable head.

Some identifiable features of the bdelloids include :

- Well-developed foot glands
- A mouth opening with a long oesophagus
- Strong teeth (labelled by a tooth index)
- Many cilia
- Species-specific upper lip shape
- Order-specific corona type
  - Philodinida consist of two ciliated discs
  - Adinetida consist of a ventral ciliated field
  - Philodinavida have a small corona

The bdelloid digestive and reproductive systems can be found within the trunk sections of their bodies, with the stomach being the most visible of the organs. In certain genera, (Habrotrocha, Otostephanos and Scepanotrocha) the bdelloid can actually be identified by the appearance of distinct spherical pellets within the stomach, which will be released as faeces. These pellets are a distinguishing characteristic since all the other genera release faeces as loose material.

Most bdelloids retract the foot while they eat, but there are four genera that lack a foot: Adineta, Bradyscela, Henoceros and Philodinavus. This affects not only how they feed but also how they crawl; for instance Adineta and Bradyscela slide whereas the other genera loop.

== Behaviour ==
A bdelloid feeding

The behaviour of bdelloids can be split into four categories: feeding, locomotion, reproduction and stress-induced behaviours.

=== Feeding ===
The specific feeding behaviour of bdelloids is varied but most use rings of cilia in the corona organ to create currents of water which blow food through the mouth to the mastax organ which has been adapted specifically for grinding food. Food includes suspended bacteria, algae, detritus, and other things.

=== Locomotion ===
There appear to be three main methods of movement: free swimming, inch-worming along a substrate, or sessility. Inch-worming (or crawling) involves taking alternate steps with the head and tail, as do certain leeches, which gives the group their name (Greek βδέλλα or bdella, meaning leech).

=== Reproduction ===
Bdelloids are of interest in the study of the evolution of sex because a male has never been observed, and females reproduce exclusively by parthenogenesis, a form of asexual reproduction where embryos grow and develop without the need for fertilization; this is akin to the apomixis seen in some plants. Each individual has paired gonads. Despite having been asexual for millions of years, they have diversified into more than 450 species and are fairly similar to other sexually reproducing rotifer species.

However, a new study provided evidence for interindividual genetic exchange and recombination in Adineta vaga, a species previously thought to be anciently asexual.

Adineta vaga is capable of carrying out DNA repair by a nonreductional meiosis. Germline DNA repair occurs in a specific period of oogenesis during which homologous chromosomes take on a meiotic-like juxtaposed configuration. This germline DNA repair results in accurate reconstitution of the genetic material transmitted to offspring.

=== Evolution of obligate parthenogenetic reproduction ===
In 2003, the mode of asexual reproduction in the bdelloid rotifers was wholly unknown. One theory of how obligate parthenogenesis arose in bdelloid rotifers was that parthenogenic lineages lost the ability to respond to sex-inducing signal, which is why these lineages retained their asexuality. The obligate parthenogenetic strains of bdelloid rotifers produce a sex-inducing signal but have lost the ability to respond to that signal. It was later discovered that the inability to respond to sex-inducing signals in obligate parthenogens was caused by simple Mendelian inheritance of the gene op.

=== Stress-induced behaviour ===
Video of a rotifer transforming into a xerosome

Bdelloids are able to survive environmental stresses by entering a state of dormancy known as anhydrobiosis which enables the organism to rapidly dehydrate and thus resist desiccation. While preparing for this dormant state many metabolic processes are adjusted to equate for the change in state; e.g. the production of protective chemicals. The bdelloid can remain in this state, which is known as a 'xerosome' until the return of a sufficient amount of water, at which point they will rehydrate and become active within hours. Hatching of the young will only occur when conditions are at their most favourable. These forms of dormancy are also known as cryptobiosis or quiescence. Bdelloids have been known to survive in this state for up to 9 years while waiting for favourable conditions to return. In addition to surviving desiccation through anhydrobiosis, desiccation stress on two bdelloid species actually helped to maintain fitness and even improved their species fecundity. The rotifers that were consistently kept hydrated fared worse than those desiccated and rehydrated.

Bdelloidea have evolved a unique mechanism to help overcome one of the major perils of asexual reproduction. According to the Red Queen hypothesis of co-evolution, obligate asexuals will be driven extinct by rapidly changing parasites and pathogens, because they cannot change their genotypes quickly enough to keep up in this never-ending race. In populations of bdelloid rotifers, however, many parasites are destroyed during periods of extended desiccation. Moreover, desiccated bdelloid rotifers are easily blown away from parasite-infested habitats by wind, and establish new, healthy populations elsewhere, which allows them to escape the Red Queen by moving in time and space instead of using sex to change their genotype.

When these creatures recover from desiccation, it has been shown that they undergo a potentially unique genetic process where horizontal gene transfer occurs, resulting in a significant proportion of the bdelloid genome, up to 10%, having been obtained through horizontal gene transfer from bacteria, fungi and plants. How and why horizontal gene transfer occur in bdelloids is under much debate at present; particularly with regards to possible connections between the foreign genes and the desiccation process as well as possible connections to bdelloids' ancient asexuality.

When they desiccate completely, their DNA breaks up into many pieces. And when they come back to life after being rehydrated, it creates an opportunity for alien DNA fragments to enter their genome. This process was improved 60 million years ago when they captured a bacterial gene this way, which gave them a new gene regulatory system. The new system was used to keep transposons in check.

Bdelloid rotifers are extraordinarily resistant to damage from ionizing radiation due to the same DNA-preserving adaptations used to survive dormancy. These adaptations include an extremely efficient mechanism for repairing DNA double-strand breaks. This repair mechanism was studied in two Bdelloidea species, Adineta vaga, and Philodina roseola. and appears to involve mitotic recombination between homologous DNA regions within each species.

=== Horizontal gene transfer ===
Large-scale horizontal transfer of bacterial, plant and fungal genes into bdelloid rotifers has been documented, and may represent an important factor in bdelloid evolution.

== Gallery ==
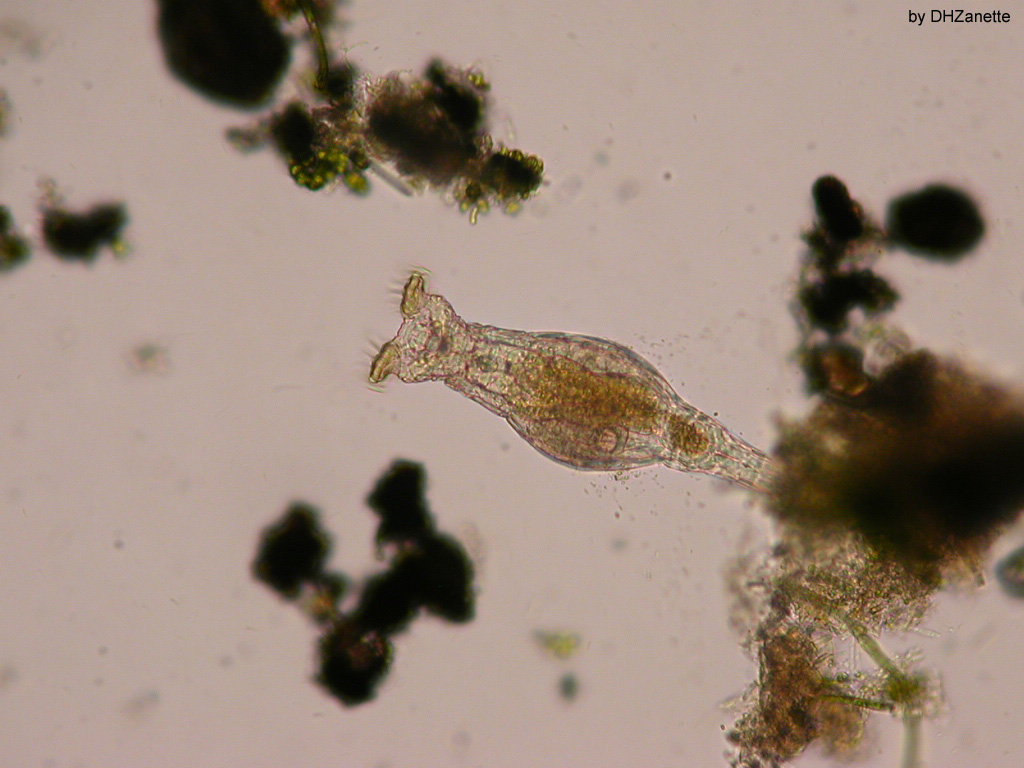
Lateral view of a bdelloid.

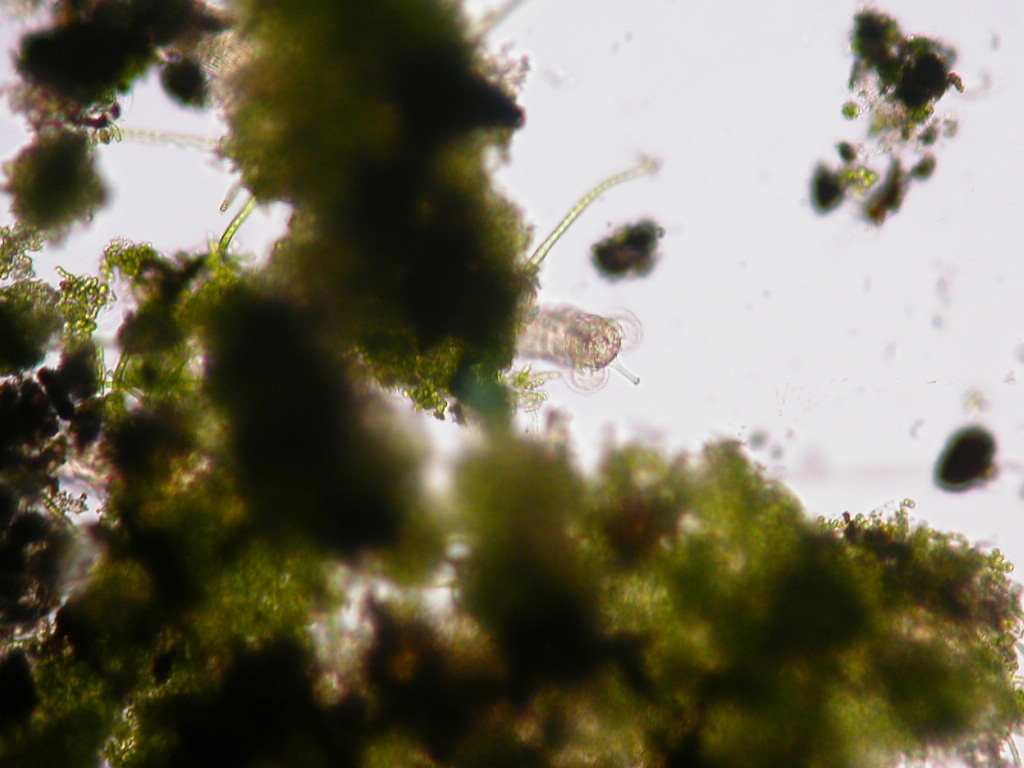
Frontal view of a bdelloid's corona.

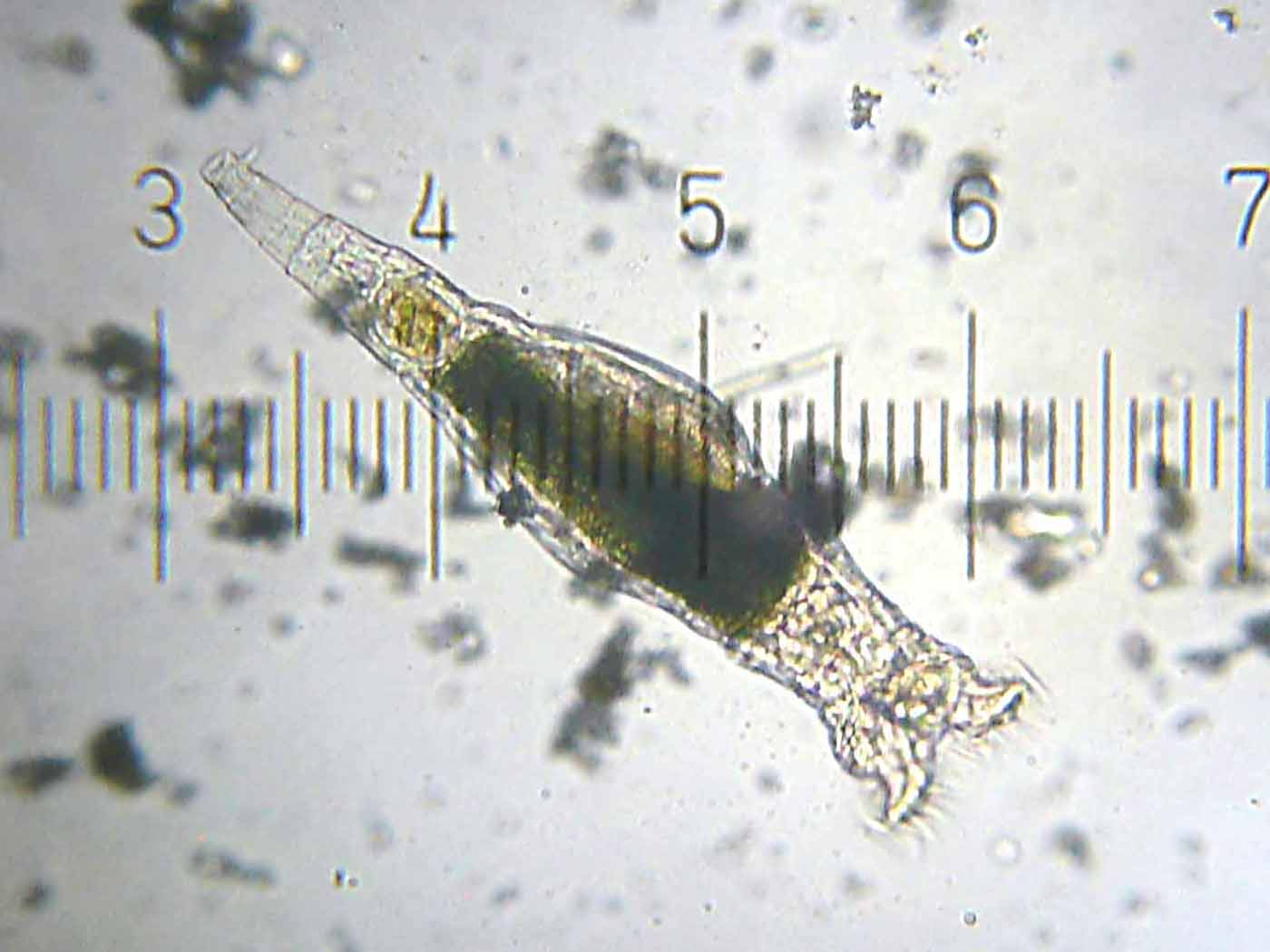
Lateral view of a bdelloid.

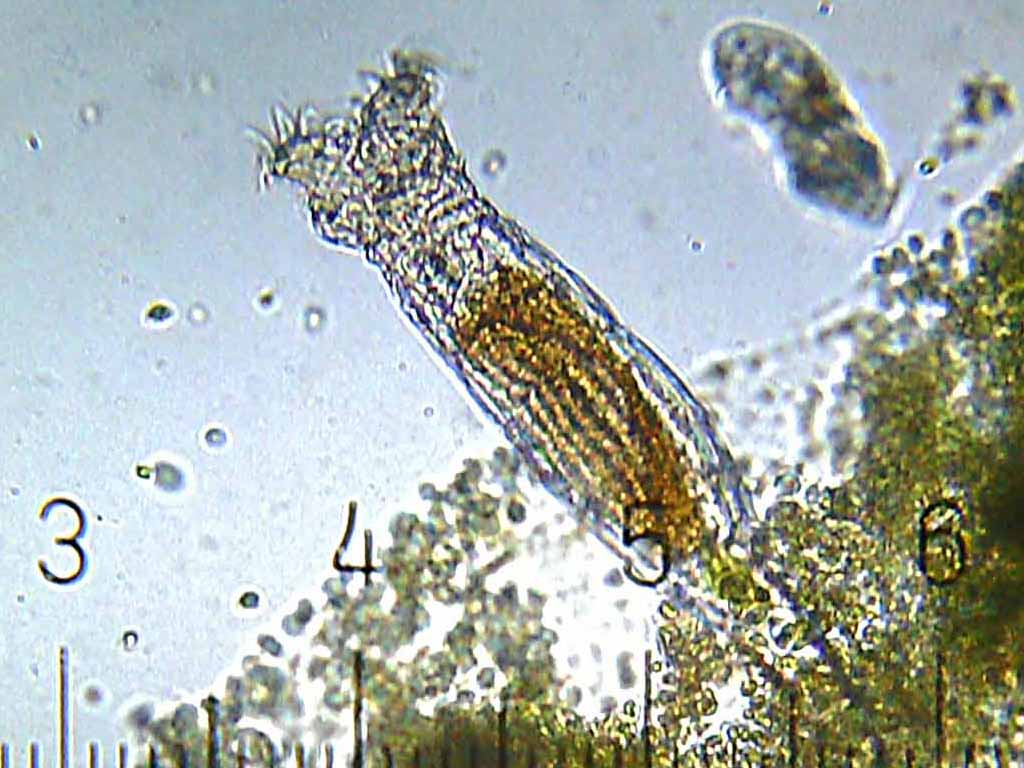
Lateral view of a bdelloid.

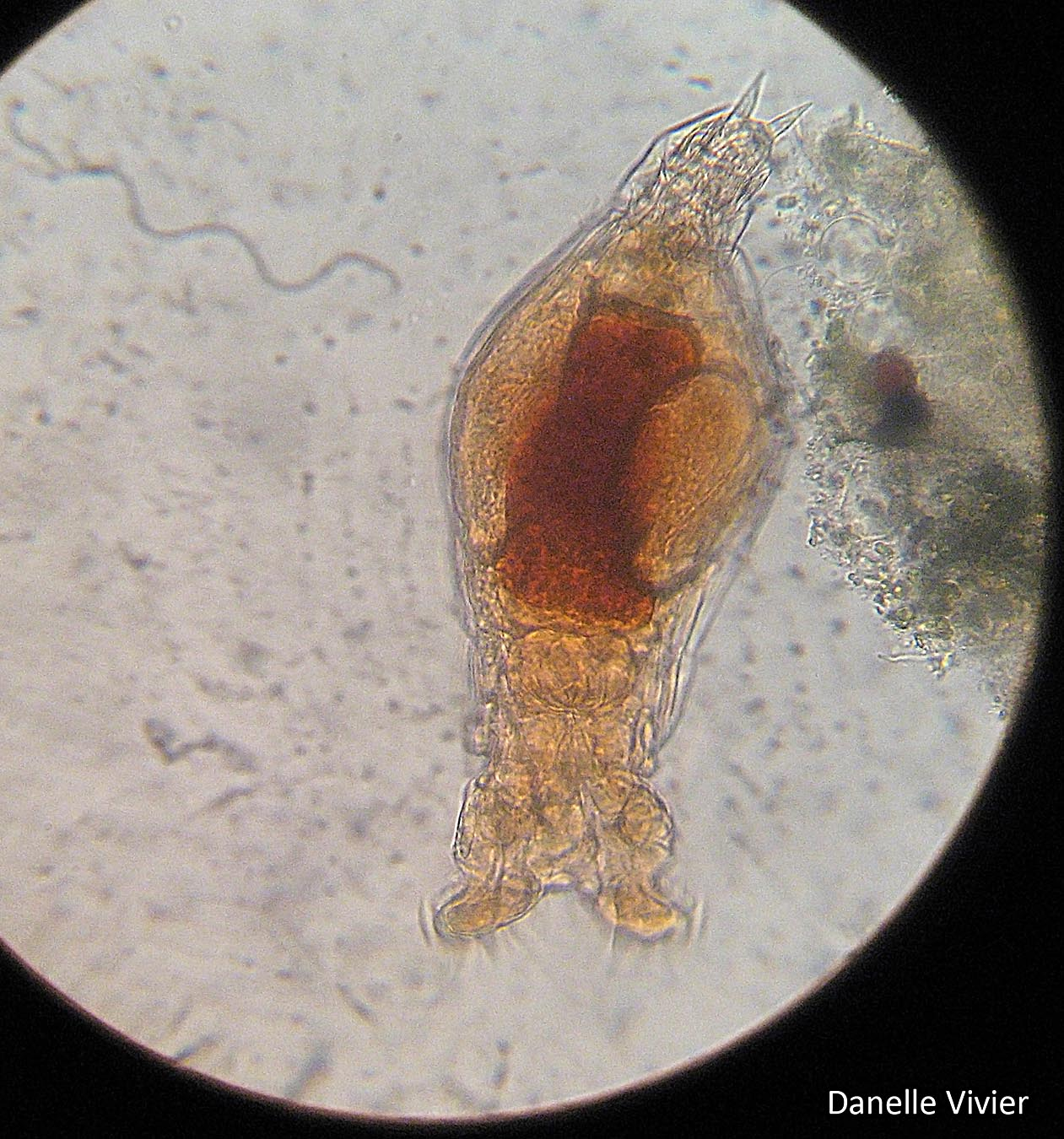
Lateral view of a bdelloid in algae-rich water

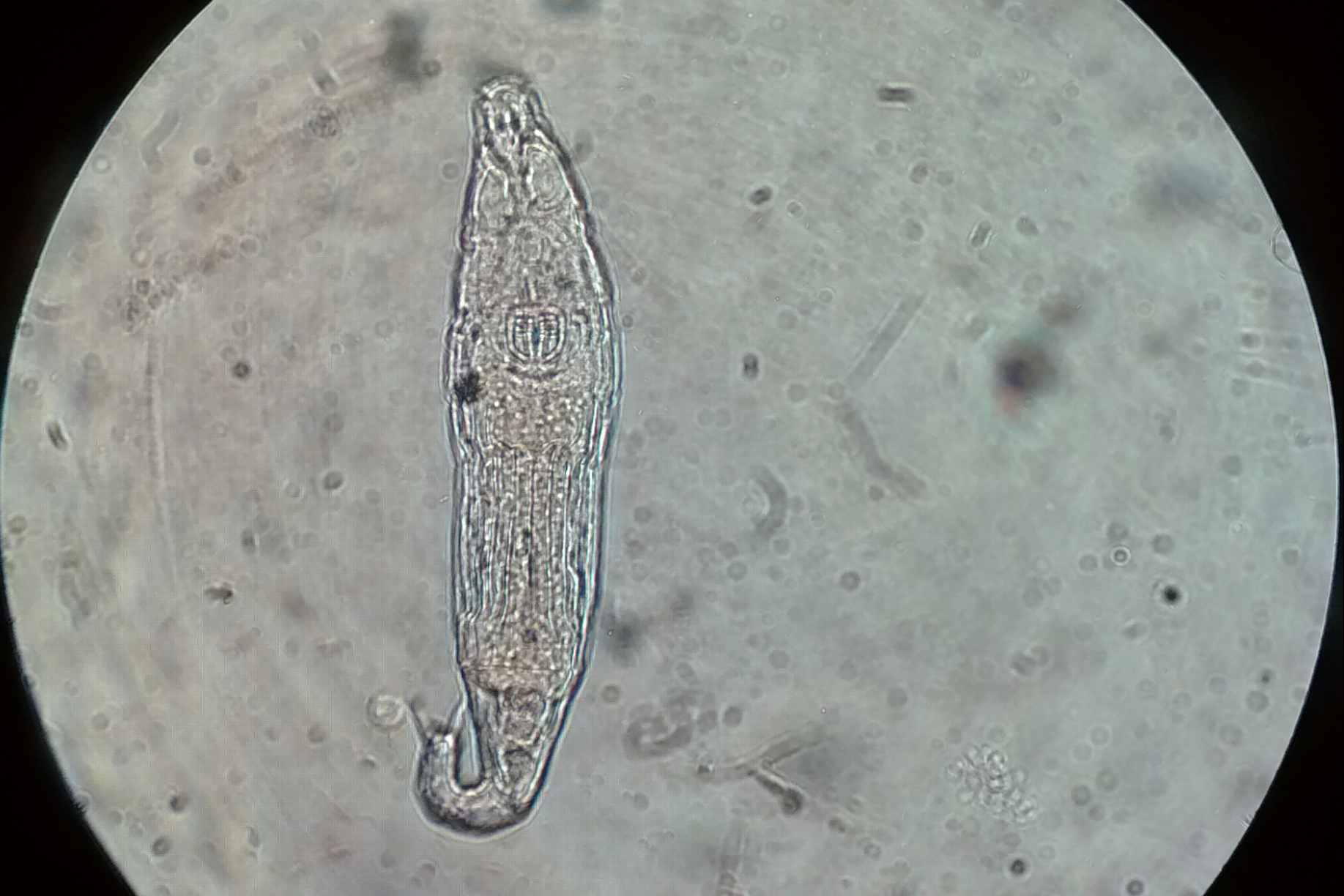
Specimen of the genus Philodina
