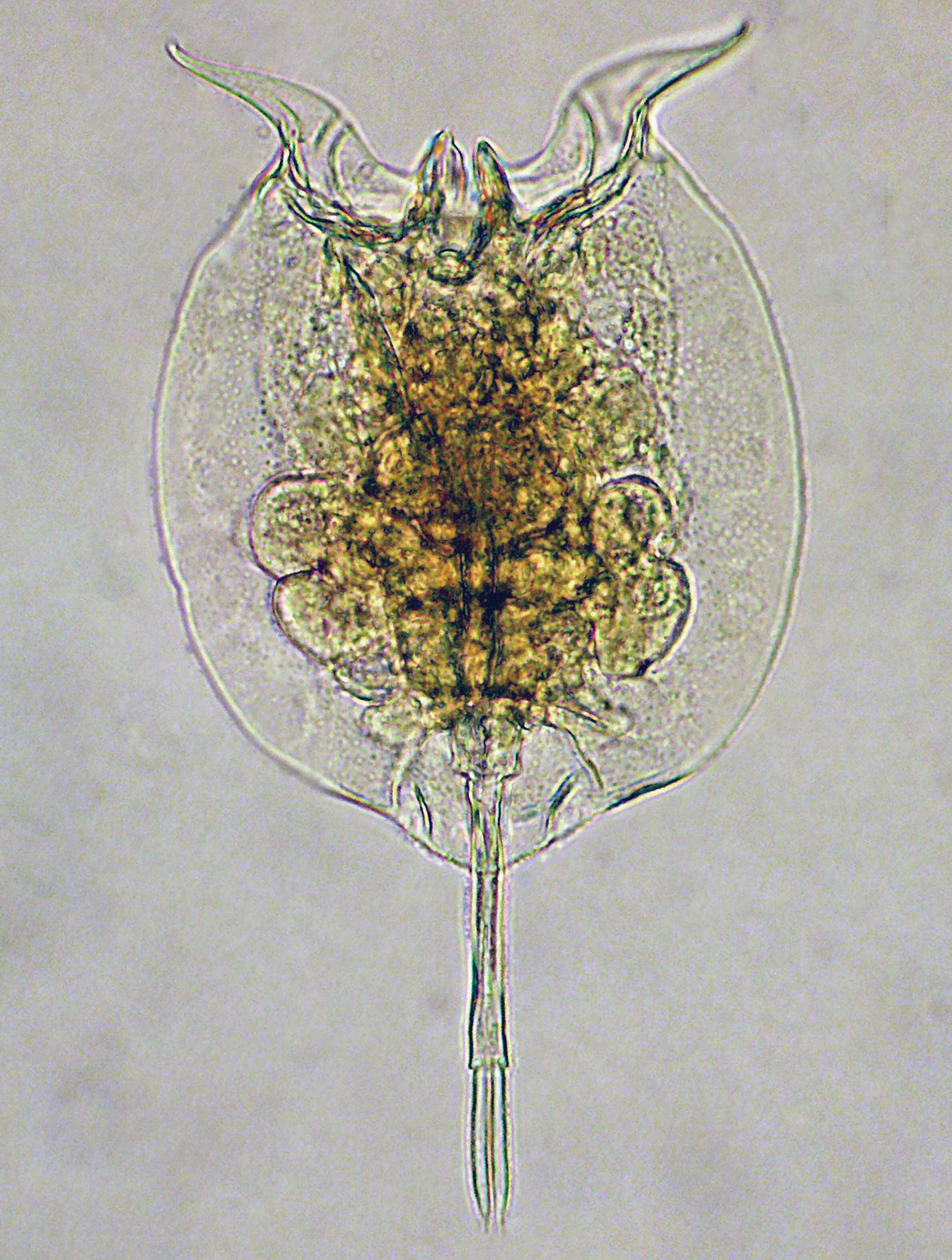
- Pulchritia dorsicornuta

Scientific classification
- Kingdom: Animalia
- Phylum: Rotifera
- Superclass: Eurotatoria

Classes
- Bdelloidea; Monogononta

= Eurotatoria =

Superclass of rotifers

Eurotatoria is a superclass of rotifers.
