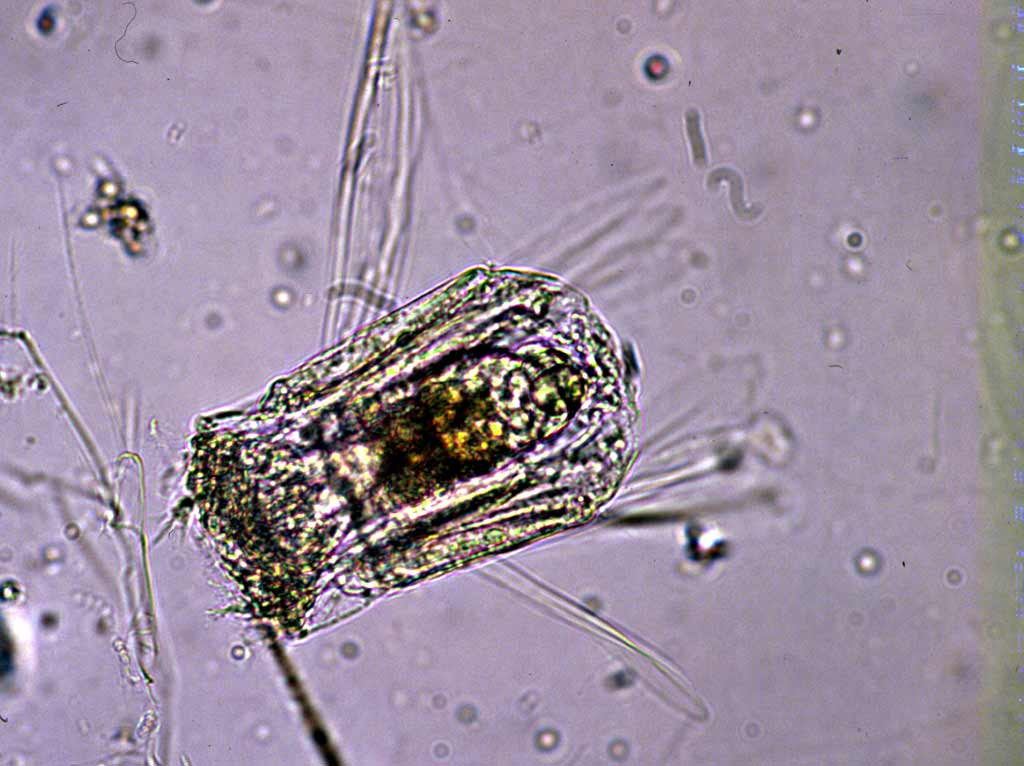
- Polyarthra sp.

Scientific classification
- Kingdom: Animalia
- Phylum: Rotifera
- Superclass: Eurotatoria
- Class: Monogononta; Plate, 1889

Orders
- Flosculariaceae; Ploima; Collothecaceae

= Monogononta =

Monogononta Temporal range: Eocene–present

Class of rotifers

Monogononta is a class of rotifers, found mostly in freshwater but also in soil and marine environments. They include both free-swimming and sessile forms. Monogononts generally have a reduced corona, and each individual has a single gonad, which gives the group its name. Males are generally smaller than females, and are produced only during certain times of the year, with females otherwise reproducing through parthenogenesis.

Their mastax is not designed for grinding. They produce mictic and amictic eggs. The class contains 1,570 species.

Females are always diploid, and males are haploid. Diploid females produce two types of eggs. One type give rise to new females like themselves, and another that give rise to females that only produce haploid eggs. These will develop into males. When males, through hypodermic impregnation, inject sperm into the body cavity of females carrying a haploid egg, the fertilized egg will develop into diploid resting eggs that can remain in diapause for days to many years, before they hatch into new diploid females that can produce two types of females. But there are some exceptions from the rule: A few females can produce both diploid and haploid eggs, and the female in a couple of species can produce morphologically distinct diploid eggs through parthenogenesis that undergo diapause. Other types, like Asplanchna, are ovoviviparous, where eggs develop and hatch in the uterus.
