= Antarctic microorganism =

Antarctica is one of the most physically and chemically extreme terrestrial environments to be inhabited by lifeforms. The largest plants are mosses, and the largest animals that do not leave the continent are a few species of insects.

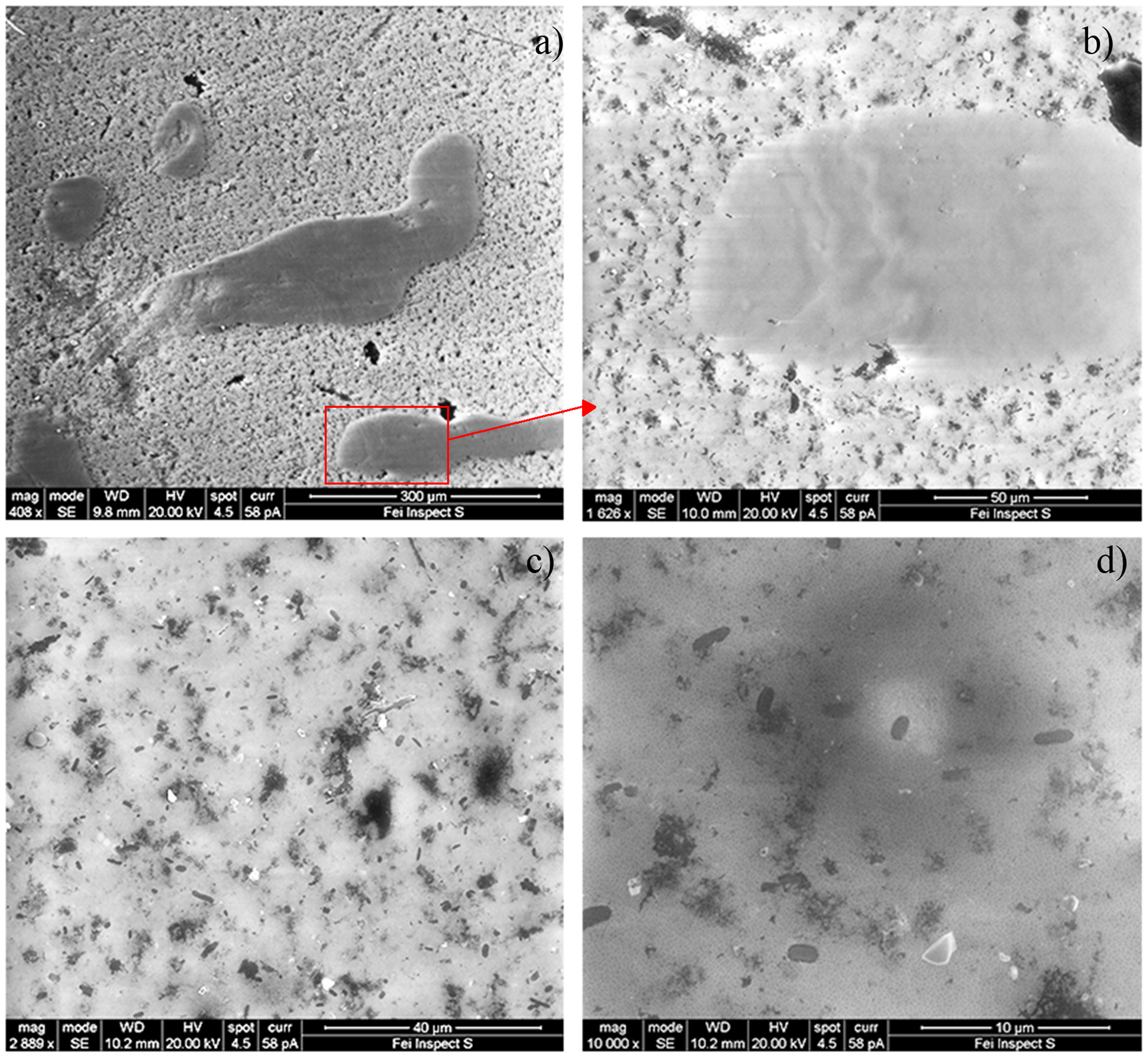
Microbiome on the High Antarctic Plateau

== Climate and habitat ==
Although most of the continent is covered by glacial ice sheets, ice-free areas comprising approximately 0.4% of the continental land mass are discontinuously distributed around the coastal margins. The McMurdo Dry Valleys region of Antarctica is a polar desert characterized by extremely low annual precipitation (<100 mm (3.9 in)) and an absence of vascular plants and vertebrates; microbial activity dominates biological functioning. Mean summer high and winter low temperatures in the dry valleys are −5 °C (23 °F) and −30 °C (−22 °F). Because precipitation is both infrequent and low, seasonal water availability in hydrologically connected soils make areas adjacent to water bodies more hospitable relative to dry upland soils. Polar ecosystems are particularly sensitive to climate change, where small changes in temperature result in greater changes in local hydrology, dramatically affecting ecosystem processes.

Soils in Antarctica are nearly two-dimensional habitats, with most biological activity limited to the top four or five inches by the permanently frozen ground below. Environments can be limiting due to soil properties such as unfavorable mineralogy, texture, structure, salts, pH, or moisture relationships. Visible sources of organic matter are absent for most of continental Antarctica. Dry Valley soil ecosystems are characterized by large variations in temperature and light regimes, steep chemical gradients and a high incidence of solar radiation with an elevated ultraviolet B (UVB) light component. Dry Valley soils originate from weathering of bedrock and glacial tills that consist of granites, sandstones, basalts and metamorphic rocks. Space within these rocks provide protection for microorganisms against some (but not all) of these conditions: i.e., protection from wind scouring and surface mobility, a reduction in UV exposure, reduced desiccation and enhanced water availability, and thermal buffering. Half of the soils in the Dry Valleys have subsurface ice, either as buried massive ice or as ice-cemented soil (permafrost). The permafrost layer is typically within 30 cm (12 in) of the soil surface.

== Microorganisms overview ==
The harsh environment and low availability of carbon and water support a simplified community of mosses, lichens, and mats of green algae and red, orange, and black cyanobacteria near lakes and ephemeral streams. Living among the mats are bacteria, yeasts, molds, and an array of microscopic invertebrates that feed on microbes, algae, and detritus: nematodes, protozoa, rotifers, tardigrades, and occasionally, mites and springtails. Even simpler communities exist in the arid soils that occupy the majority of the landscape.

Microbes in Antarctica adapt to aridity the same way microbes in hot deserts do: when water becomes scarce, the organisms simply dry up, shut down metabolic activity, and wait in a cryptobiotic state until water again becomes available. Microbes can also go dormant in a cryptobiotic state known as anhydrobiosis when they become dehydrated due to low water availability. A more extreme survival method would be long term natural cryopreservation. Samples of permafrost sediments aged 5–10 thousand to 2–3 million years old have been found to contain viable micromycete and bacterial cells.

== Algae ==
Algae is present in almost all ice-free areas and occurs in soils, as epiphytes on mosses, in cyanobacterial mats and in plankton of lakes and ponds. It is also possible to find algae associated with rocks or living in the thin film of melted water in the snow patches. Presently there are over 300 algal taxa identified on Antarctica, with Bacillariophyceae (Diatoms) and Chlorophyta (Green algae) being the most widespread on Antarctica. Diatoms are abundant in aquatic environments decreasing in number in terrestrial habitats. Chlorophyta are also important in mats in lakes and ponds but tend to increase their relative importance in terrestrial environments and especially in soils, where they are the densest algal group. Xanthophyceae (Yellow-green algae) are an important component of the flora in soils of Antarctica. Other algal groups (Dinophyta, Cryptophyta, and Euglenophyta) are mainly limited to freshwater communities of the Dry Valleys.

Algae species identified in recent research:

- Hantzschia amphioxys
- Heterococcus moniliformis
- Kentrosphaera facciolae
- Luticola desmetii
- Luticola doliiformis
- Luticola evkae
- Luticola muticopsis
- Luticola permuticopsis
- Luticola tomsui
- Monodus coccomyxa
- Pinnularia borealis
- Prasiola crispa
- Xanthonema bristolianum
- Xanthonema exile

== Animals ==
=== Arthropods ===
Distribution of arthropods is limited to areas of high soil moisture and/or access to water, such as streams, or snow meltwater.

=== Nematodes ===
Carbon appears to be more important than moisture in defining good habitats for nematodes in the Dry Valleys of Antarctica. Scottnema lindsayae, a microbial feeder and the most abundant and widely distributed metazoan invertebrate, often occurs as the sole metazoan species in the McMurdo Dry Valleys. It makes its living eating bacteria and yeast out in the dry, salty soils that dominate the valleys. All other invertebrate species are more abundant in moist or saturated soils where algae and moss are more abundant. Distribution of most nematode species is correlated negatively with elevation (due to temperature and precipitation) and salinity, and positively with soil moisture, soil organic matter, and nutrient availability. Eudorylaimus spp. is the second most abundant nematode, followed by Plectus murrayi who are the least abundant nematodes. Plectus antarcticus eats bacteria and prefers living in ephemeral streams. An average 2-pound bag of dry valley soils contains approximately 700 nematodes, while the more fertile soil found at higher latitudes on the continent may contain approximately 4,000 nematodes.

Nematode species identified in recent research:

- Amblydorylaimus isokaryon
- Antarctenchus hooperi
- Aphelenchoides hagueri
- Aphelenchoides helicosoma
- Aphelenchoides vaughani
- Calcaridorylaimus signatus
- Ceratoplectus armatus
- Chiloplacoides antarcticus
- Chiloplectus masleni
- Coomansus gerlachei
- Cuticularia firmata
- Ditylenchus spp.
  - Ditylenchus parcevivens
- Enchodelus signyensis
- Eudorylaimus spp.
  - Eudorylaimus antarcticus
  - Eudorylaimus coniceps
  - Eudorylaimus glacialis
  - Eudorylaimus nudicaudatus
  - Eudorylaimus pseudocarteri
  - Eudorylaimus shirasei
  - Eudorylaimus spaulli
  - Eudorylaimus verrucosus
- Eumonhystera vulgaris
- Eutobrilus antarcticus
- Geomonhystera antarcticola
- Geomonhystera villosa
- Mesodorylaimus spp.
  - Mesodorylaimus imperator
  - Mesodorylaimus signatus
- Monhystera spp.
- Panagrolaimus spp.
  - Panagrolaimus davidi
  - Panagrolaimus magnivulvatus
- Paramphidelus spp.
  - Paramphidelus antarcticus
- Plectus spp.
  - Plectus accuminatus
  - Plectus antarcticus
  - Plectus belgicae
  - Plectus frigophilus
  - Plectus insolens
  - Plectus meridianus
  - Plectus murrayi
  - Plectus tolerans
- Rhabdblaimus spp.
- Rhabditis krylovi
- Rhyssocolpus paradoxus
- Rotylenchus capensis
- Scottnema lindsayae
- Teratocephalus pseudolirellus
- Teratocephalus rugosus
- Teratocephalus tilbrooki
- Tylenchus spp.

=== Rotifers ===
The three species listed below were found in moss-dominated moist soils.

Rotifer species identified in recent research:

- Epiphanes spp.
- Habrotrocha spp.
- Philodina spp.

=== Tardigrades ===
Tardigrade species identified in recent research:

- Acutuncus antarcticus
- Diphascon spp. (form. Adropoion spp.)
  - Diphascon alpinum
  - Diphascon dastychi
  - Diphascon polare
  - Diphascon tricuspidatum (form. Adropion tricuspidatum)
  - Diphascon victoriae
- Hypsibius spp. (form. Diphascon spp.)
  - Hypsibius alpinus
  - Hypsibius arcticus
  - Hypsibius cfr mertoni simoizumii
  - Hypsibius convergens
  - Hypsibius oberhaeseri
  - Hypsibius scoticus (form. Diphascon scoticus)
- Macrobiotus arcticus
- Macrobiotus cfr polaris
- Macrobiotus mottai
- Macrobiotus oberhauseri
- Macrobiotus polaris
- Minibiotus furcatus
- Ramajendas frigidus
- Ramazzottius spp.
  - Ramazzottius oberhauseri

== Bacteria ==
Typically, the highest numbers of cultured bacteria are from relatively moist coastal soils, compared with the small bacteria communities of dry inland soils. Cyanobacteria are found in all types of aquatic habitats and often dominate the microbial biomass of streams and lake sediments. Leptolyngbya frigida is dominant in benthic mats, and is frequently found in soils and as an epiphyte on mosses. Nostoc commune can develop to sizes visible to the naked eye if supplied with a thin water film. The genus Gloeocapsa is one of the few cryptoendolithic taxa with a high adaptation to extreme environmental conditions in rocks of the Dry Valleys. Actinomycetota such as Arthrobacter spp., Brevibacterium spp., and Corynebacterium spp. are prominent in the Dry Valleys. Thermophilic bacteria have been isolated from thermally heated soils near Mt. Melbourne and Mt. Rittman in northern Victoria Land. Bacteria genera found in both air samples and the Antarctic include Staphylococcus, Bacillus, Corynebacterium, Micrococcus, Streptococcus, Neisseria, and Pseudomonas. Bacteria were also found living in the cold and dark in a lake buried a half-mile deep (0.80 km) under the ice in Antarctica.

Bacteria species identified in recent research:

- Acinetobacter spp.
- Alicyclobacillus acidocaldarius
- Aquaspirillum spp.
- Arthrobacter spp.
- Azospirillum spp.
- Bacillus spp.
  - Bacillus fumarioli
  - Bacillus thermoantarcticus
- Bizionia argentinensis
- Brevibacterium spp.
  - Brevibacterium antarcticum
- Brevundimonas spp.
- Chryseobacterium spp.
- Corynebacterium spp.
- Flavobacterium spp.
- Gloeocapsa spp.
- Hymenobacter roseosalivarius
- Leptolyngbya frigida
- Massila spp.
- Micrococcus spp.
- Modestobacter multiseptatus
- Neisseria spp.
- Nocardia spp.
- Nostoc commune
- Paenibacillus spp.
- Planococcus spp.
- Pseudonocardia antarctica
- Pseudomonas spp.
- Psychrobacter spp.
- Sphingobacterium spp.
- Staphylococcus spp.
- Stenotrophomonas spp.
- Streptococcus spp.
- Streptomyces spp.

== Fungi ==
Chaetomium gracile is frequently isolated from geothermally heated soil on Mt. Melbourne in northern Victoria Land. Fungi genera found in both air samples and the Antarctic include Penicillium, Aspergillus, Cladosporium, Alternaria, Aureobasidium, Botryotrichum, Botrytis, Geotrichum, Staphylotrichum, Paecilomyces, and Rhizopus.

Fungi species identified in recent research:

- Alternaria spp.
- Antarctomyces psychotrophicus
- Arthrobotrys ferox
- Aspergillus spp.
  - Aspergillus ustus
- Aureobasidium spp.
- Botryotrichum spp.
- Botrytis spp.
- Chaetomium gracile
- Cadophora ssp.
  - Cadophora malorum
- Cerrena unicolor
- Cladosporium spp.
  - Cladosporium cladosporioides
  - Cladosporium herbarum
- Cochliobolus heliconiae
- Coniochaeta ligniaria
- Curvularia inaequalis
- Debaryomyces ssp.
  - Debaryomyces hansenii
- Geomyces spp.
  - Geomyces pannorum (form. Chrysosporium pannorum)
- Geotrichum spp.
- Hohenbuehelia spp.
- Holwaya mucida
- Mortierella antarctica
- Mucor hiemalis
- Paecilomyces spp.
- Penicillium spp.
  - Penicillium jensenii
  - Penicillium swiecickii
- Phaeosphaeria spp.
- Phialophora spp.
  - Phialophora fastigiata (form. Cadophora fastigiata)
- Phoma spp.
  - Phoma herbarum
- Rhizopus spp.
- Rhizoscyphus ericae
- Staphylotrichum spp.
- Stereum hirsutum
- Stictis radiata
- Thelebolus microsporus
- Trichophyton eboreum

=== Yeast ===
Yeast species identified in recent research:

- Aureobasidium pullulans
- Candida spp.
  - Candida psychrophilia
- Species formerly referred to Cryptococcus
  - Naganishia albida
  - Vishniacozyma foliicola
  - Vishniacozyma victoriae
  - Naganishia vishniacii
- Debaryomyces hansenii
- Leucosporidium antarcticum
- Leucosporidium scottii
- Rhodotorula spp.
  - Rhodotorula laryngis
  - Rhodotorula minuta
  - Rhodotorula rubra
  - Rhodotorula slooffiae
- Trichosporon spp.
  - Trichosporon beigelii
  - Trichosporon cutaneum

== Protozoa ==
The small amoebae are of two types. The most abundant are Acanthamoeba and Echinamoeba. The second group consists of monopodal, worm-like amoebae, the subcylindrical Hartmannella and Saccamoeba, and the lingulate Platyamoeba stenopodia Page.

Amoebae species identified in recent research:

- Acanthamoeba spp.
- Echinamoeba spp.
- Hartmannella spp.
- Platyamoeba stenopodia
- Saccamoeba spp.

Flagellate species identified in recent research:

- Bodo edax
- Bodo mutabilis
- Bodo saltans
- Heteromita globosa
- Oikomonas termo
