= Habrotrocha elegans =

Scientific classification
- Domain: Eukaryota
- Kingdom: Animalia
- Phylum: Rotifera
- Class: Bdelloidea
- Order: Bdelloida
- Family: Habrotrochidae
- Genus: Habrotrocha
- Species: H. elegans

Binomial name
- Habrotrocha elegans (Milne, 1886)

Synonyms
- Callidina venusta Bryce, 1897; Macrotrachela elegans Milne, 1886

Species of rotifer

Habrotrocha elegans is a species of bdelloid rotifers. It is found in moss and running water in Europe.
