= Penicillium clavigerum =

Scientific classification
- Domain: Eukaryota
- Kingdom: Fungi
- Division: Ascomycota
- Class: Eurotiomycetes
- Order: Eurotiales
- Family: Aspergillaceae
- Genus: Penicillium
- Species: P. clavigerum

Binomial name
- Penicillium clavigerum Demelius 1923

Species of fungus

Penicillium clavigerum is a fungus species of the genus of Penicillium which produces fumigaclavine A and fumigaclavine B

== See also ==
- List of Penicillium species
