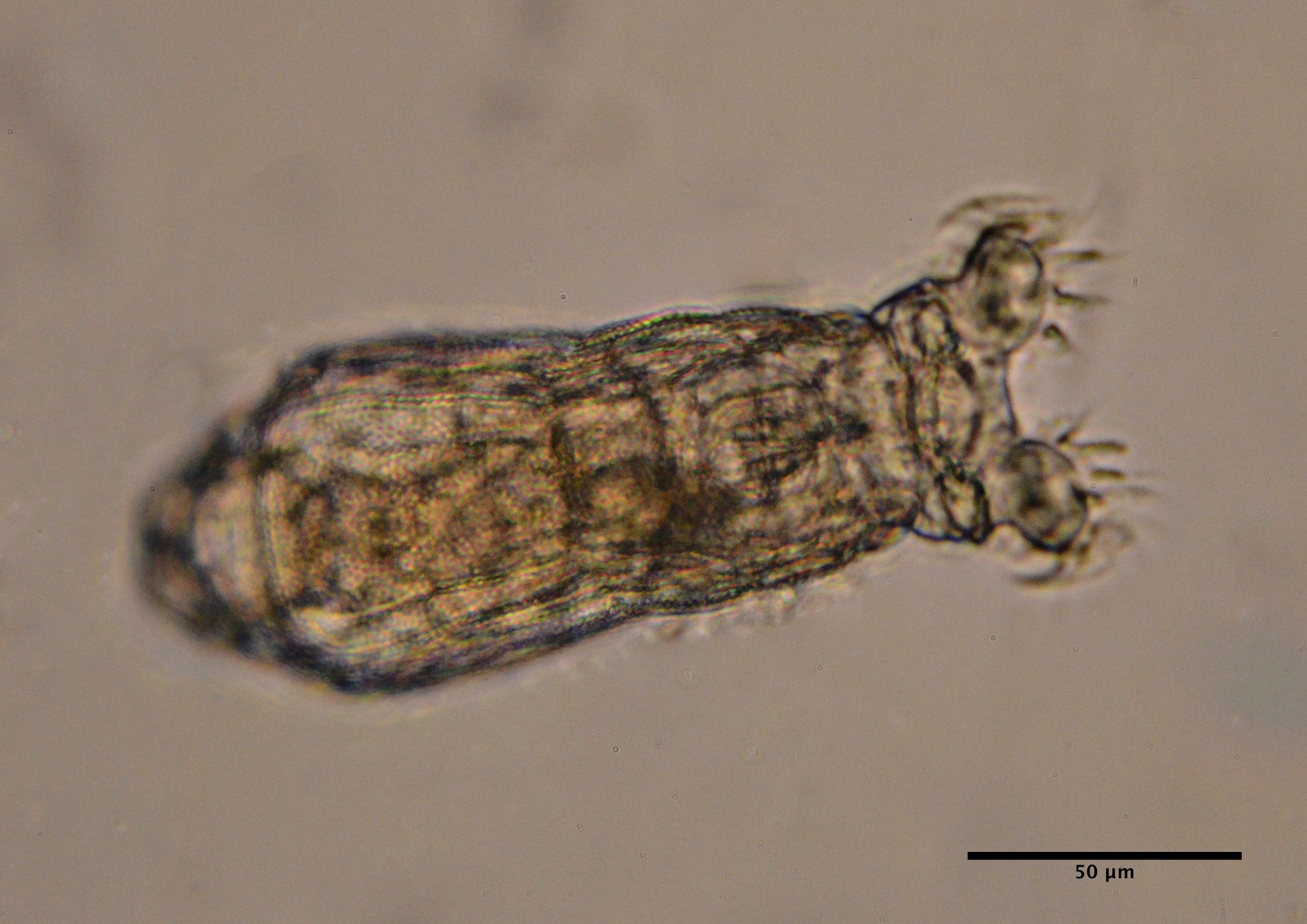

Scientific classification
- Domain: Eukaryota
- Kingdom: Animalia
- Phylum: Rotifera
- Class: Bdelloidea
- Order: Bdelloida
- Family: Philodinidae
- Genus: Philodina
- Species: P. rugosa

Binomial name
- Philodina rugosa Bryce, 1903

= Philodina rugosa =

Species of rotifer

Philodina rugosa is species of rotifer in the family Philodinidae. There are currently 3 subspecies:

- Philodina rugosa callosa Bryce, 1903
- Philodina rugosa coriacea Bryce, 1903
- Philodina rugosa rugosa Bryce, 1903
