= Penicillium scabrosum =

Scientific classification
- Domain: Eukaryota
- Kingdom: Fungi
- Division: Ascomycota
- Class: Eurotiomycetes
- Order: Eurotiales
- Family: Aspergillaceae
- Genus: Penicillium
- Species: P. scabrosum

Binomial name
- Penicillium scabrosum Frisvad, Samson & Stolk (1990)

Species of fungus

Penicillium scabrosum is a species of fungus in the family Aspergillaceae was first formally described in 1990. The fungus forms distinctively coloured colonies that are typically yellow, orange, or red-brown, and features microscopically roughened stalks that inspired its species epithet scabrosum. It has been repeatedly isolated from soil samples in temperate regions, particularly in northern Europe and Canada, and occurs frequently in wheat and barley field soils. The fungus produces several biologically active compounds including fumigaclavines, fumitremorgines, viridicatin, viridicatol, and fumagillin, some of which have antibacterial and antiprotozoal properties.

== Taxonomy ==
Penicillium scabrosum is a species of fungus in the genus Penicillium that was first formally described in 1990 by Jens Frisvad, Robert Samson, and Amelia Stolk. The species was repeatedly isolated from soil samples in temperate regions, particularly in northern Europe and Canada. It occurs frequently in wheat and barley field soils, often alongside P. janczewskii. The species name scabrosum refers to the conspicuously roughened stipes (stalks) of the penicilli, which is a key identifying characteristic.

== Description ==
Penicillium scabrosum forms strongly coloured colonies that are typically yellow, orange, or red-brown on culture media, often with concentric zones of different colours. When grown on Czapek-yeast autolysate agar (CYA), colonies reach 26–32 mm in diameter after one week at 25 °C and display a strictly velvety texture.

Under the microscope, P. scabrosum shows distinctive features. Conidiophore stipes (stalks supporting spore-producing structures) measure 200–400 by 3–4 micrometres (μm) and are conspicuously roughened and often encrusted. The penicilli (spore-producing structures) are predominantly one-stage branched, though two-stage branching occasionally occurs. Metulae (branches of the conidiophore) measure 10–20 by 2.5–4.0 μm, extending at about 45° angles. Phialides (spore-producing cells) are slender with well-defined, abruptly narrowed openings, measuring 7–11 by 2.0–2.5 μm. Conidia (asexual spores) are globose to somewhat globose, rough-walled, and measure 2.4–3.2 μm.

The fungus grows well on various laboratory media. On malt extract agar (MEA), colonies reach 21–31 mm in diameter after one week at 25 °C, with conidia appearing dark bluish-green. On 2% Difco yeast extract-15% sucrose agar (YES), colonies are conspicuously yellow, reaching 32–38 mm diameter after one week. Growth is inhibited at low temperatures, with colonies only reaching 2–4 mm on CYA at 5°C, and no growth occurs on CYA at 37 °C. The fungus shows very weak growth on creatine-sucrose agar with poor or no acid production.

Penicillium scabrosum produces several biologically active secondary metabolites, including fumigaclavines, fumitremorgins, viridicatin, viridicatol, and fumagillin. The mycotoxin fumagillin shows antiprotozoal activity, while viridicatin and viridicatol have antibacterial properties. The fungus can be distinguished from the similar P. atrovenetum by its secondary metabolite profile; P. atrovenetum produces 3-nitropropionic acid and atrovenetin, which are not found in P. scabrosum.

Penicillium scabrosum has been isolated from various substrates including soil samples from agricultural fields, food products, cereal crops (particularly wheat and barley), and as a spoilage organism in foods containing lipids and cereals. The fungus has been documented in multiple countries including Denmark, the Netherlands, Germany, Great Britain, Canada, Sweden, Czechoslovakia, Turkey, and others. Its ability to produce multiple mycotoxins makes it potentially significant as a food spoilage organism.

== See also ==
- List of Penicillium species
