= Fumigaclavine B O-acetyltransferase =

Identifiers
- EC no.: 2.3.1.205

Databases
- IntEnz: IntEnz view
- BRENDA: BRENDA entry
- ExPASy: NiceZyme view
- KEGG: KEGG entry
- MetaCyc: metabolic pathway
- PRIAM: profile
- PDB structures: RCSB PDB PDBe PDBsum
Search
- PMC: articles
- PubMed: articles
- NCBI: proteins

Fumigaclavine B O-acetyltransferase (EC 2.3.1.205, FgaAT) is an enzyme with systematic name acetyl-CoA:fumigaclavine B O-acetyltransferase. It catalyses the following chemical reaction

fumigaclavine B
+
acetyl-CoA
fumigaclavine A
+ coenzyme A

Fumigaclavine C

The enzyme is part of the biosynthetic pathway to fumigaclavine C, an ergot alkaloid, in Aspergillus fumigatus.
