= Callidina elegans =

Scientific classification
- Kingdom: Animalia
- Phylum: Rotifera
- Class: Bdelloidea
- Order: Bdelloida
- Family: Adinetidae
- Genus: Callidina
- Species: C. elegans

Binomial name
- Callidina elegans Ehrenberg, 1830

Species of rotifer

Callidina elegans, commonly known as the graceful callidina, is a species of freshwater rotifers in the family Adinetidae.
