= C11H12N2O =

The molecular formula C_{11}H_{12}N_{2}O (molar mass: 188.23 g/mol) may refer to:

- FHATHBIN
- Indolepropionamide (IPAM)
- Phenazone, or antipyrine
- Vasicine (peganine)
