= Fumigaclavine =

Fumigaclavine may refer to:

- Fumigaclavine A
- Fumigaclavine B
- Fumigaclavine C
