= C23H30N2O2 =

The molecular formula C_{23}H_{30}N_{2}O_{2} (molar mass: 366.49 g/mol) may refer to:

- Fumigaclavine C
- Ohmefentanyl
- Piminodine, an analgesic
