= Adineta ricciae =

Scientific classification
- Kingdom: Animalia
- Phylum: Rotifera
- Class: Bdelloidea
- Order: Bdelloida
- Family: Adinetidae
- Genus: Adineta
- Species: A. ricciae

Binomial name
- Adineta ricciae Segers & Shiel, 2005

Species of rotifers

Adineta ricciae is a species of freshwater rotifers in the family Adinetidae. It was first described in 2005 after being discovered by chance in dry mud beside a billabong in Australia. It is used as a model organism as it is easy to keep in culture.

== Description ==
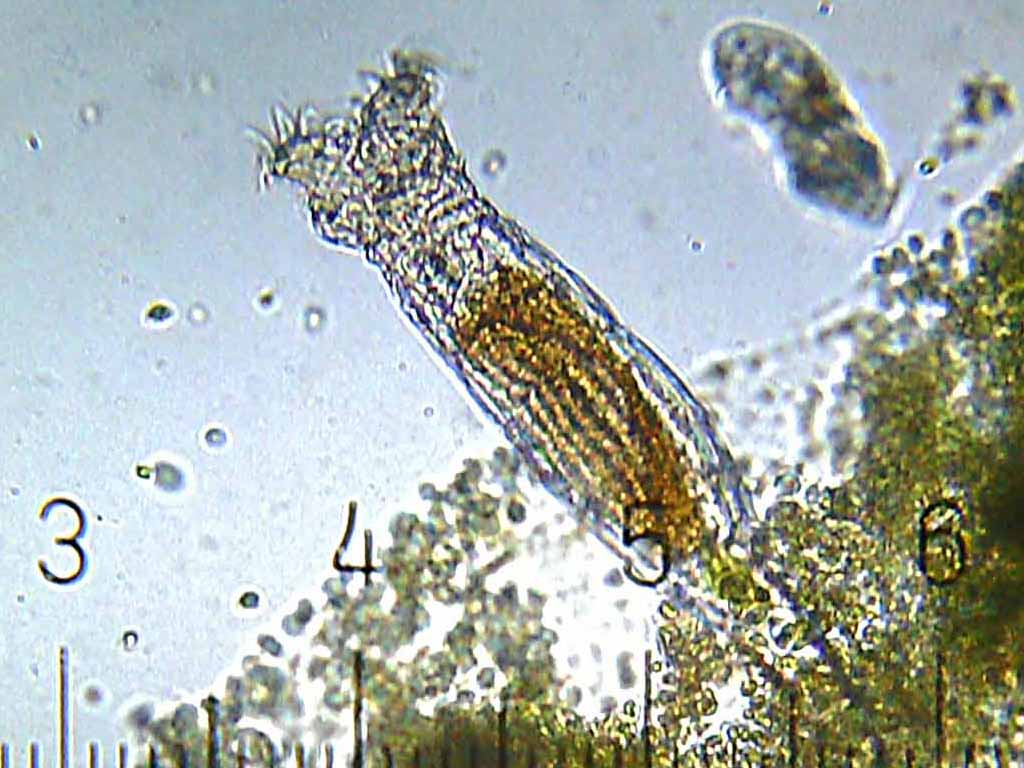
A bdelloid rotifer similar to Adineta ricciae

Adineta ricciae is a microscopic invertebrate that can grow to a length of about 0.2 millimetres (0.008 in). It has a retractable head with two pigmented, front-facing eyes, a mouth aperture and a corona of cilia. The bands of cilia are used in locomotion with two separate groups twirling in opposite directions. The body is slightly broader than the head and is cylindrical and contains the internal organs. It has muscles, a large stomach and short intestine, a cloaca, an excretory system, nerve ganglia, organs sensitive to touch and a pair of ovaries. At the posterior end is a foot with foot glands, short triangular spurs and three toes. The whole is enclosed in a flexible, transparent cuticle.

== Discovery ==
This rotifer was first described in 2005 from an individual found in rehydrated dry mud taken from Ryan's Billabong, Victoria, Australia by Hendrik Segers and Russell J. Shiel. The researchers set this specimen aside in a dish as they were concentrating on other aspects of rotifer research. When they came to re-examine it several weeks later, they were surprised to discover that a large population had developed. It transpired that this rotifer was new to science and, because it was exceptionally easy to grow in culture, it has since been used as a model organism.

== Behaviour ==
Bdelloid rotifers are aquatic organisms and when their habitat dries up, they have the capability of going into a dormant state known as cryptobiosis to survive desiccation. They can remain in this state for periods of several years and when circumstances improve, they can revitalise in a few hours and continue with their normal activities. No male bdelloid rotifers have ever been found and it is believed that all bdelloid rotifers reproduce solely by means of asexual reproduction through the process of parthenogenesis. Molecular studies have shown that all bdelloid rotifers are descended from a common ancestor which lost its ability to reproduce sexually about 80 million years ago. Adineta ricciae has been used in this research.

== Research ==
In general, creatures that reproduce asexually are less able than other animals to adapt to environmental changes because they do not experience the interchange of genes that enables the "survival of the fittest". Research has been undertaken to investigate why bdelloid rotifers are not affected in this way and can cope with enormous environmental variations. The researchers studied the genome of Adineta ricciae. It seems that some genes, in particular a gene called LEA, have two quite different functions and code for two proteins. One of these is an LEA protein, which has a protective function that prevents other proteins from agglutinating during the desiccation process; the other one helps to maintain the cell membrane. This gives bdelloid rotifers a means of becoming genetically diverse even though not exchanging genes through sexual reproduction and suggests that asexual reproduction could even be an evolutionary means of creating diversity.
