= Adineta emsliei =

Scientific classification
- Kingdom: Animalia
- Phylum: Rotifera
- Class: Bdelloidea
- Order: Bdelloida
- Family: Adinetidae
- Genus: Adineta
- Species: A. emsliei

Binomial name
- Adineta emsliei Iakovenko, Smykla, Convey, Kasparona, Kozeretska, Trokhymets, Dykyy, Plewka, Devetter & Janko, 2015

Species of rotifer

Adineta emsliei is a species of rotifers belonging to the genus Adineta and the family Adinetidae. It has been seen at McMurdo Station in Antarctica. It was described in 2015 by Iakovenko, Smykla, Convey, Kasparona, Kozeretska, Trokhymets, Dykyy, Plewka, Devetter, and Janko.
