= IPAM =

IPAM may refer to:

- Indolepropionamide, a chemical compound
- Institute for Pure and Applied Mathematics, a research institute at the University of California, Los Angeles
- Institute of Public Administration and Management, an institute of the University of Sierra Leone
- IP address management, software for computer network management
