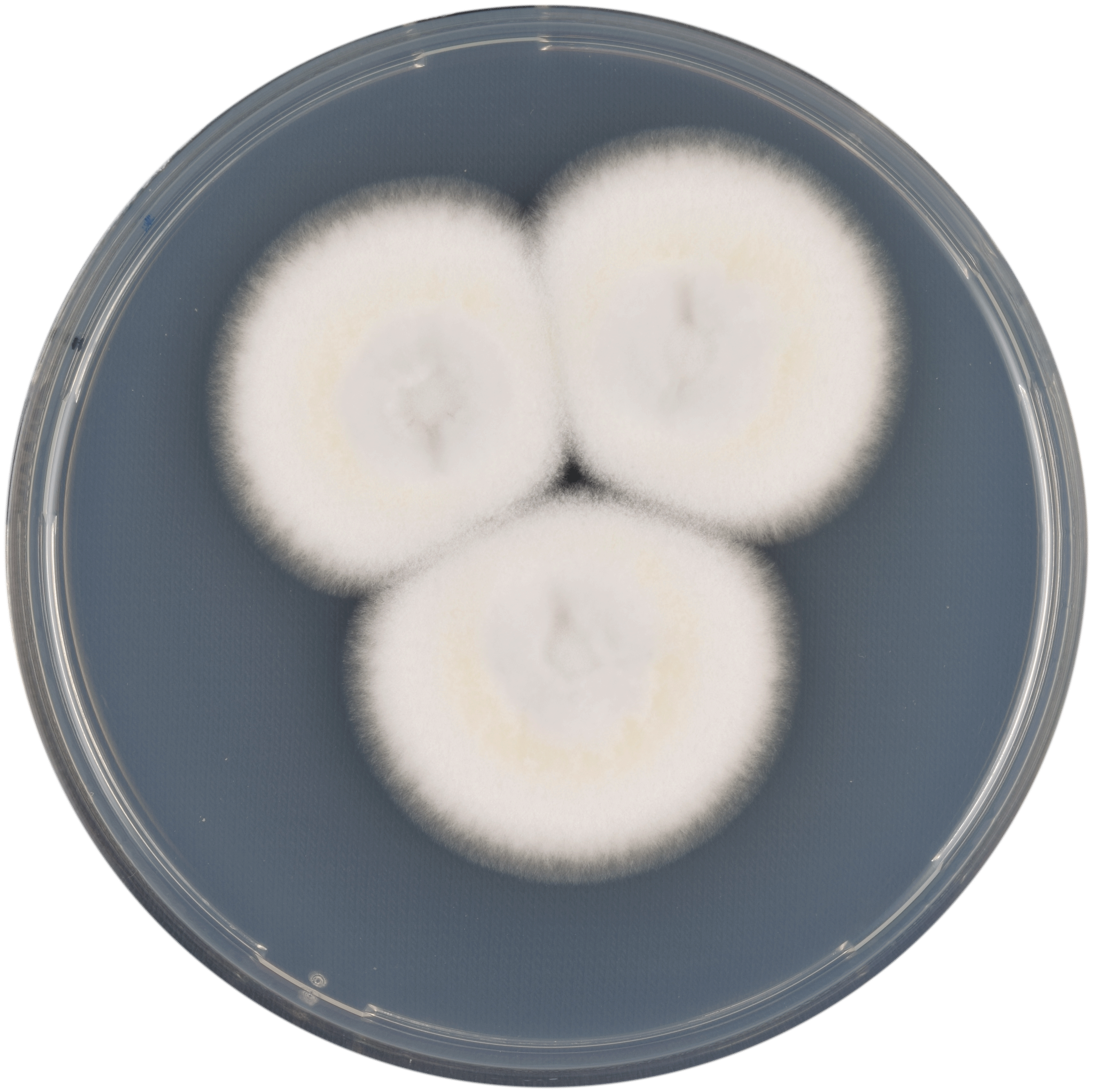

Scientific classification
- Kingdom: Fungi
- Division: Ascomycota
- Class: Eurotiomycetes
- Order: Eurotiales
- Family: Aspergillaceae
- Genus: Aspergillus
- Species: A. fumigatiaffinis

Binomial name
- Aspergillus fumigatiaffinis S.B. Hong, Frisvad & Samson (2005)

= Aspergillus fumigatiaffinis =

Species of fungus

Aspergillus fumigatiaffinis is a species of fungus in the genus Aspergillus. It is from the Fumigati section. The species was first described in 2005. It has been reported to produce auranthine, cycloechinuline, fumigaclavines, helvolic acid, neosartorin, palitantin, pyripyropene A, pyripyropene E, pyripyropene O, pyripyropene S, tryptoquivaline, and tryptoquivalone.
