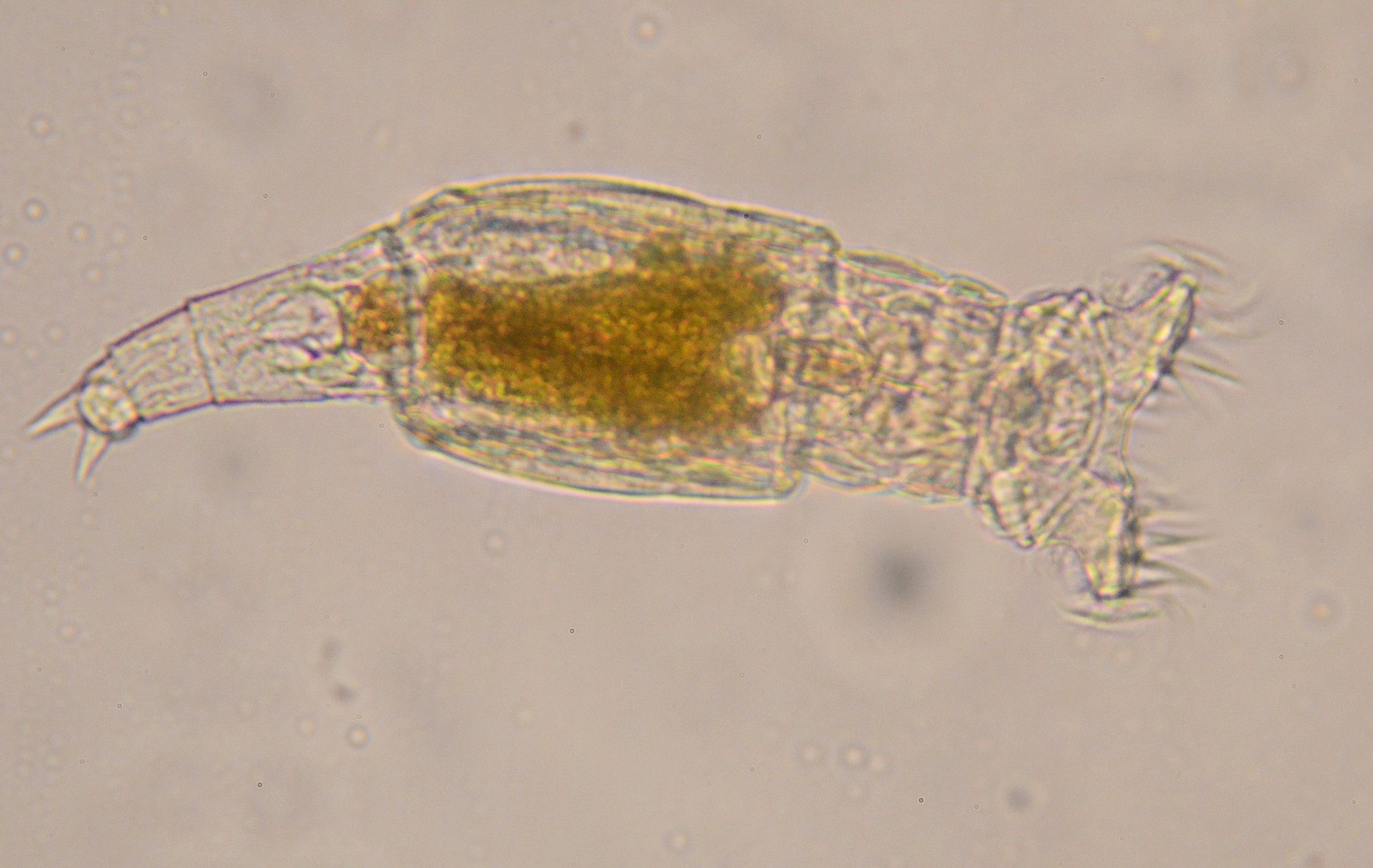

Scientific classification
- Kingdom: Animalia
- Phylum: Rotifera
- Class: Bdelloidea
- Order: Bdelloida
- Family: Philodinidae
- Genus: Philodina
- Species: P. acuticornis

Binomial name
- Philodina acuticornis Murray, 1902

= Philodina acuticornis =

Species of rotifer

Philodina acuticornis is a species of freshwater bdelloid rotifers.
