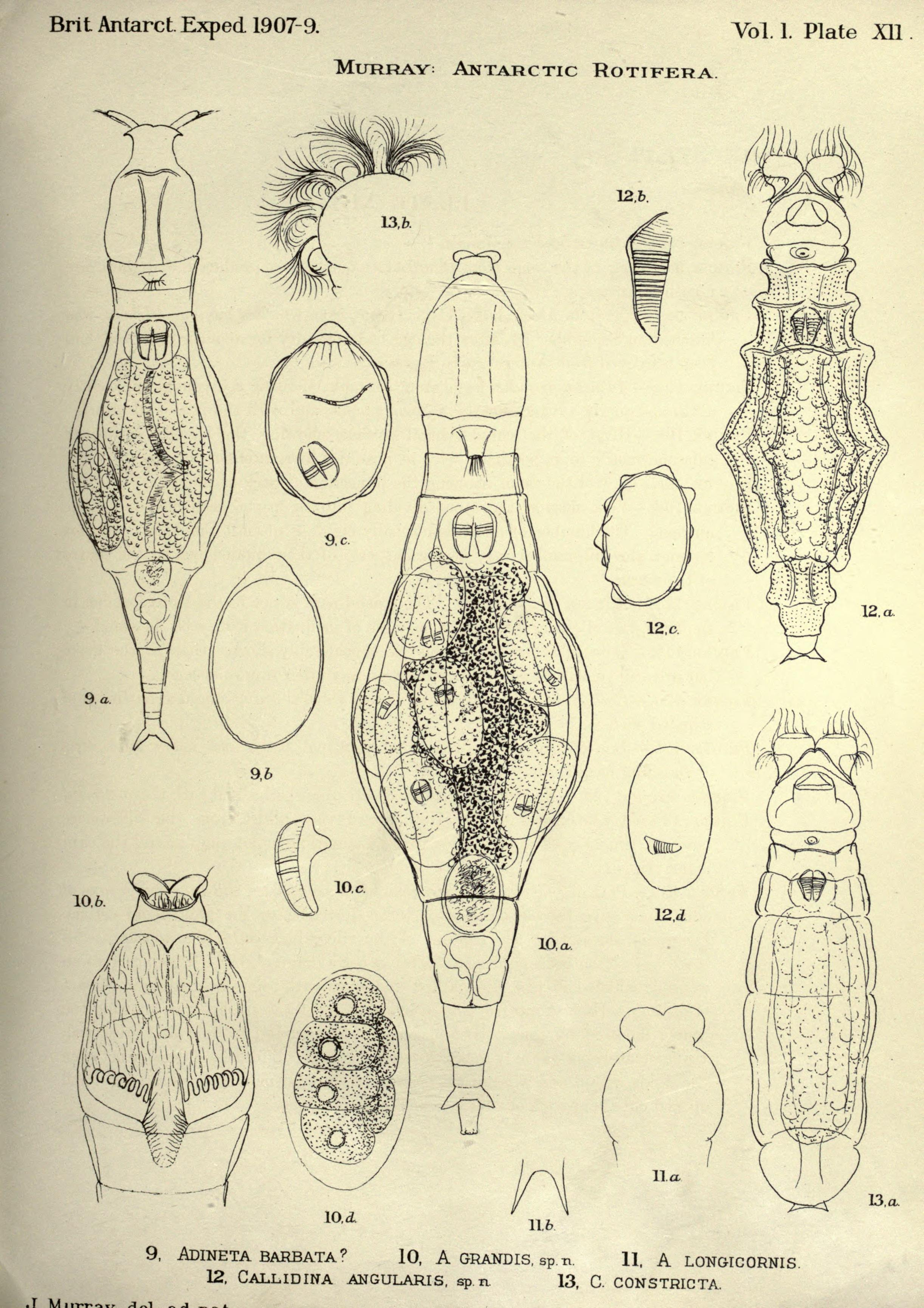
- Illustrations of several species of this genus (9) Adineta barbata (?) with eggs, (10) Adineta grandis, and (11) Adineta longicornis

Scientific classification
- Kingdom: Animalia
- Phylum: Rotifera
- Class: Bdelloidea
- Order: Bdelloida
- Family: Adinetidae
- Genus: Adineta; Hudson, 1886

= Adineta =

Genus of rotifers

Adineta is a genus of rotifers belonging to the family Adinetidae. Species of this genus are found in Europe, Northern America, Australia and the southernmost parts of the Southern Hemisphere.

== Species ==
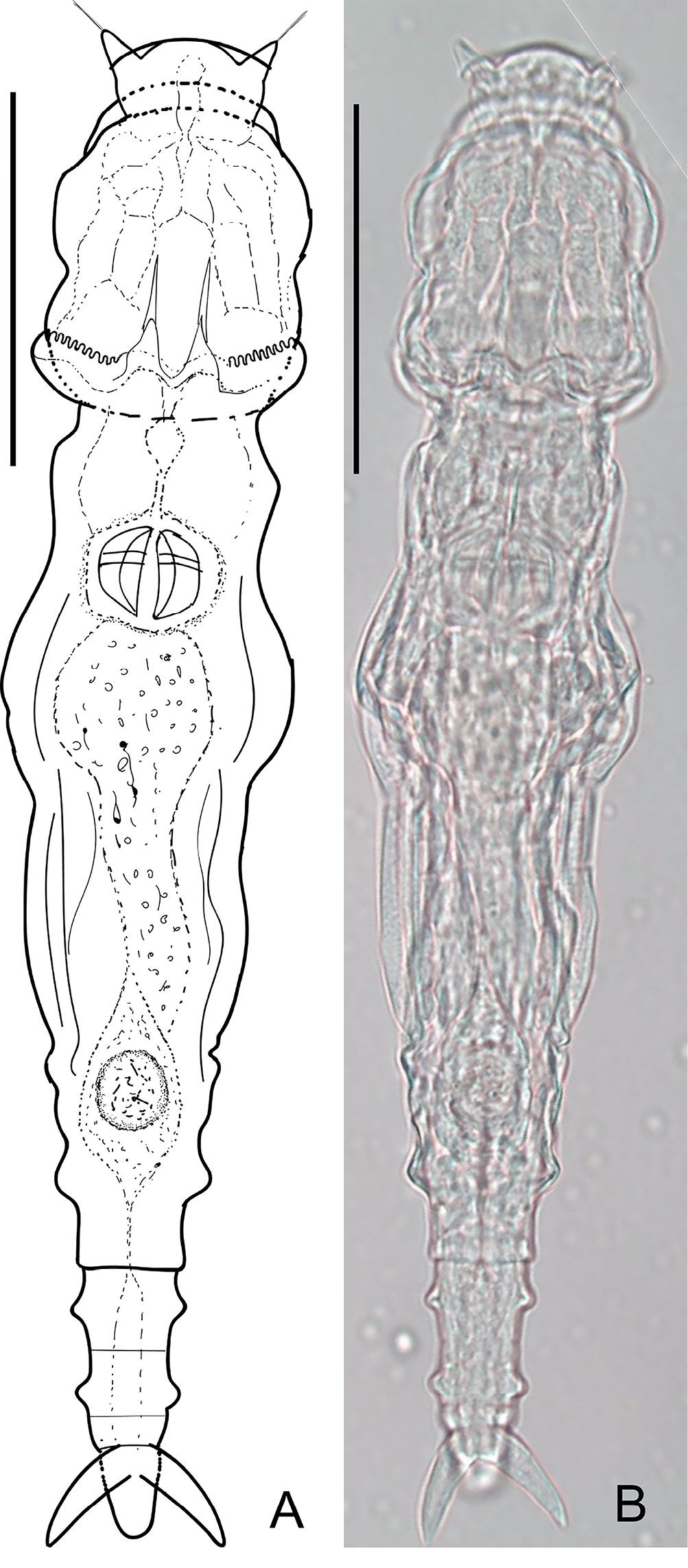
Adineta beysunae

There are currently 19 species discovered with A. vaga having five subspecies:

- Adineta acuticornis Haigh, 1967
- Adineta barbata Janson, 1893
- Adineta bartosi Wulfert, 1960
- Adineta beysunae Oerstan, 2018
- Adineta coatsi Iakovenko, Smykla, Convey, Kasparona, Kozeretska, Trokhymets, Dykyy, Plewka, Devetter & Janko, 2015
- Adineta cuneata Milne, 1916
- Adineta editae Iakovenko, 2015
- Adineta elongata Rodewald, 1935
- Adineta emsliei Iakovenko, Smykla, Convey, Kasparona, Kozeretska, Trokhymets, Dykyy, Plewka, Devetter & Janko, 2015
- Adineta fontanetoi Iakovenko, Smykla, Convey, Kasparona, Kozeretska, Trokhymets, Dykyy, Plewka, Devetter & Janko, 2015
- Adineta glauca Wulfert, 1942
- Adineta gracilis Janson, 1893
- Adineta grandis Murray, 1910
- Adineta longicornis Murray, 1906
- Adineta oculata Milne, 1886
- Adineta ricciae Segers & Shiel, 2005
- Adineta steineri Bartoš, 1951
- Adineta tuberculosa Janson, 1893
- Adineta vaga Davis, 1873
  - Adineta vaga major
  - Adineta vaga minor
  - Adineta vaga rhomboidea
  - Adineta vaga tenuicornis
  - Adineta vaga vaga

=== Adineta vaga ===
Adineta vaga is a species belonging to this genus with four subspecies: A. v. major, A. v. minor, A. v. rhomboidea, and A. v. vaga. A member of this species was uncovered from permafrost in northeastern Siberia dating to around 24,000 years before present. However it was still alive in a frozen state making it the longest reported case of rotifer survival in a frozen state.

==== Genome ====
The genome of Adineta vaga is tetraploid. It is composed mainly of anciently duplicated segments and less divergent allelic regions. Its allelic regions are rearranged and sometimes even found on the same chromosome which is in contrast to sexual species of this genus.

==== Meiosis ====
Until recently, it was considered that the reproductive mode of bdelloid rotifers is mitotic parthenogenesis. However, recent research with Adineta vaga now supports a meiotic derived oogenesis with an altered meiosis I stage. During this stage homologous chromosomes associate, likely undergo recombinational repair of DNA damage and then separate, but do not segregate into haploid nuclei.
