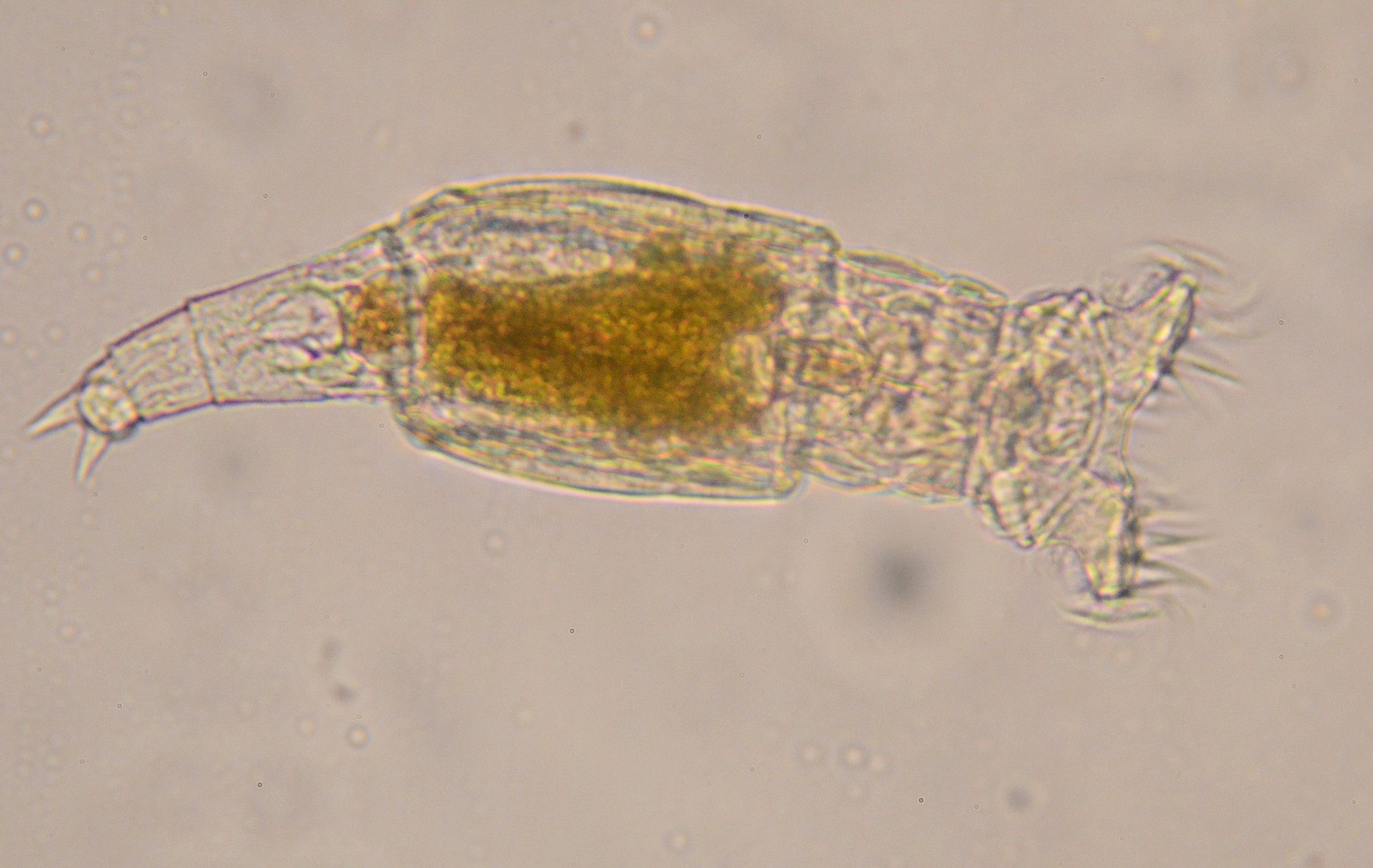
- Philodina acuticornis

Scientific classification
- Kingdom: Animalia
- Phylum: Rotifera
- Class: Bdelloidea
- Order: Bdelloida
- Family: Philodinidae
- Genus: Philodina; Ehrenberg, 1830

= Philodina =

Genus of rotifers

Philodina is a genus of rotifers belonging to the family Philodinidae.

The genus has cosmopolitan distribution.

Species:

- Philodina acuticornis Murray, 1902
- Philodina citrina Ehrenberg, 1832
- Philodina erythrophthalma Ehrenberg, 1830
- Philodina megalotrocha Ehrenberg, 1832
- Philodina roseola Ehrenberg, 1832
- Philodina rugosa Bryce, 1903
