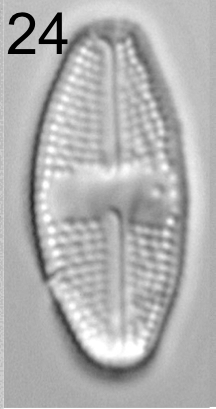
- Luticola mutica

Scientific classification
- Domain: Eukaryota
- Clade: Sar
- Clade: Stramenopiles
- Division: Ochrophyta
- Clade: Bacillariophyta
- Class: Bacillariophyceae
- Order: incertae sedis
- Genus: Luticola; Mann in F.E. Round, R.M. Crawford & D.G. Mann, 1990

Species
- Luticola bogaertsiana R.Zidarova, Z.Levkov & B.Van de Vijver, 2014; Luticola bolavenensis Glushchenko, Kulikovskiy & Kociolek, 2017; Luticola contii R.Zidarova, Z.Levkov & B.Van de Vijver, 2014; Luticola darwinii Witkowski, Bąk, Kociolek, Lange-Bertalot & Seddon in Bak et al., 2017; Luticola desmetii K.Kopalová, 2011; Luticola doliiformis K.Kopalová & B.van de Vijver, 2011; Luticola evkae K.Kopalová, 2011; Luticola galapagoensis Witkowski, Bąk, Kociolek, Lange-Bertalot & Seddon in Bak et al., 2017; Luticola grupcei A.Pavlov, T.Nakov & Z.Levkov, 2009; Luticola ivetana Chattová & Van de Vijver in Chattová et al., 2017; Luticola laosica Glushchenko, Kulikovskiy & Kociolek; Luticola magellanica (Frenguelli) Levkov, Metzeltin & Pavlov, 2013; Luticola moreirae A.Straube, P.Tremarin & T. Ludwig; Luticola neglecta R.Zidarova, Z.Levkov & B.Van de Vijver, 2014; Luticola olegsakharovii R.Zidarova, Z.Levkov & B.Van de Vijver, 2014; Luticola papilioformis A.Straube, P.Tremarin & T. Ludwig; Luticola permuticopsis K.Kopalová & B.van de Vijver, 2011; Luticola pseudodistinguenda Glushchenko, Kulikovskiy & Kociolek, 2017; Luticola pseudomurrayi B. van de Vijver & I.Tavernier, 2012; Luticola renelecohui Glushchenko, Kulikovskiy & Kociolek, 2017; Luticola robustaformis Glushchenko, Kulikovskiy & Kociolek, 2017; Luticola suecorum (Carlson) Van de Vijver in Van de Vijver & Mataloni, 2008; Luticola tomsui K.Kopalová, 2011; Luticola vancampiana Chattová & Van de Vijver in Chattová et al., 2017

= Luticola =

Genus of single-celled organisms

Luticola is a genus of marine diatoms.
