= Embata =

Scientific classification
- Kingdom: Animalia
- Phylum: Rotifera
- Class: Bdelloidea
- Order: Bdelloida
- Family: Philodinidae
- Genus: Embata; Bryce, 1910

Genus of rotifers

Embata is a genus of rotifers belonging to the family Philodinidae.

Species:

- Embata commensalis (Western, 1893)
- Embata hamata (Murray, 1906)
- Embata laticeps (Murray, 1905)
- Embata laticornis (Murray, 1905)
- Embata parasitica (Giglioli, 1863)
