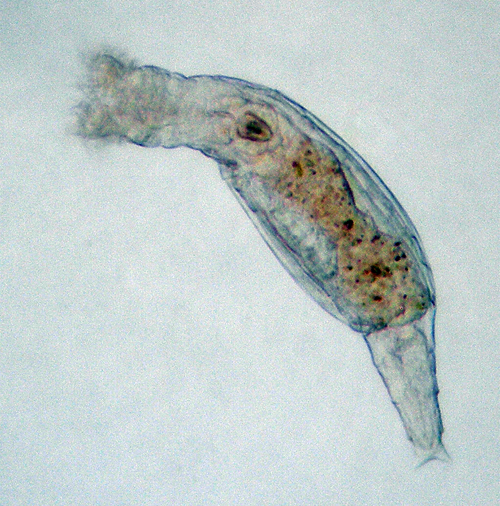

Scientific classification
- Kingdom: Animalia
- Phylum: Rotifera
- Class: Bdelloidea
- Order: Bdelloida
- Family: Habrotrochidae
- Genus: Habrotrocha
- Species: H. rosa

Binomial name
- Habrotrocha rosa Donner, 1949

= Habrotrocha rosa =

Species of bdelloid rotifer

Habrotrocha rosa is a bdelloid rotifer that has been found in leaf litter, soil, and moss in Europe and New Zealand and also in North America within the pitchers of Sarracenia purpurea, the purple pitcher plant. It is one of many species that make up the inquiline community that thrives within the water-retaining pitcher-shaped leaves of S. purpurea.
