= Callidina =

Scientific classification
- Kingdom: Animalia
- Phylum: Rotifera
- Class: Bdelloidea
- Order: Bdelloida
- Family: Adinetidae
- Genus: Callidina; Ehrenberg, 1830

Species
- Callidina bihamata Gosse in Hudson & Gosse, 1886; Callidina elegans Ehrenberg, 1830; Callidina multispinosa; Callidina quadridens Hilgendorf, 1989

Genus of freshwater rotifers

Callidina is a genus of freshwater rotifers in the family Philodinidae.
