= Cephalobidae =

Scientific classification
- Kingdom: Animalia
- Phylum: Nematoda
- Class: Chromadorea
- Order: Rhabditida
- Family: Cephalobidae

Synonyms
- Metacrobelidae

Family of roundworms

Cephalobidae is a family of nematodes which is belonging to the order Rhabditida.

== Genera ==
Genera:

- Acrobeles von Linstow, 1877
- Acrobeloides Cobb, 1924
- Cephalobus, type genus
- Scottnema Timm, 1971
