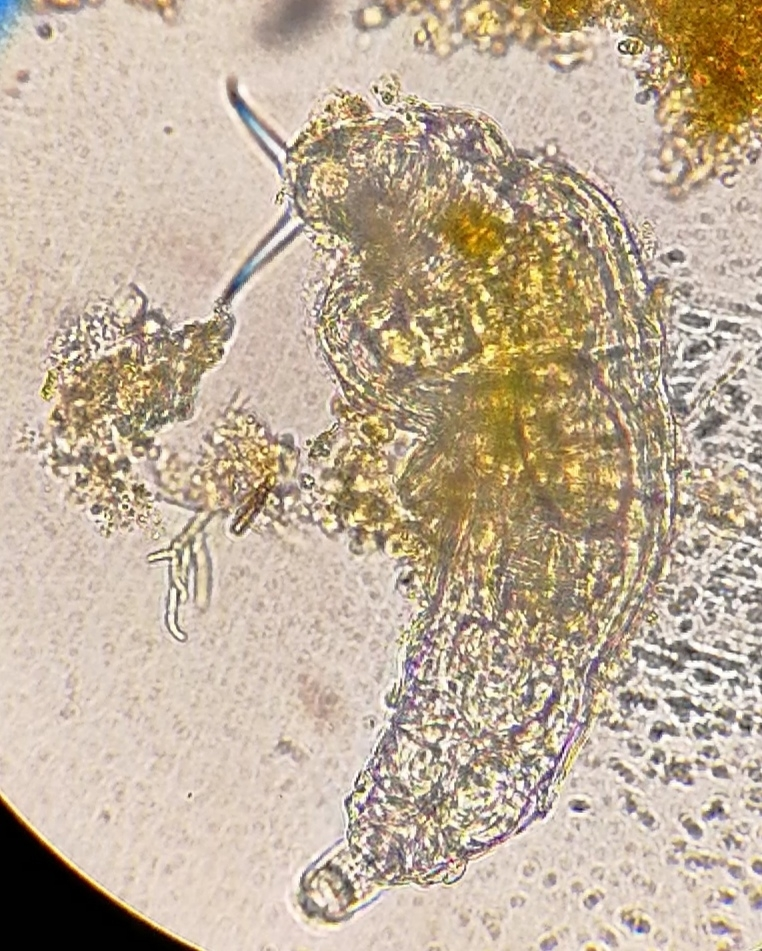
- Dissotrocha macrostyla

Scientific classification
- Domain: Eukaryota
- Kingdom: Animalia
- Phylum: Rotifera
- Class: Bdelloidea
- Order: Bdelloida
- Family: Philodinidae
- Genus: Dissotrocha; Bryce, 1910

= Dissotrocha =

Genus of rotifers

Dissotrocha is a genus of rotifers belonging to the family Philodinidae. The species of this genus are found in Europe, Australia and North America.

== Species ==
The following species are recognised in the genus Dissotrocha:

- Dissotrocha aculeata (Ehrenberg, 1832)
- Dissotrocha bjoerki Berzinš, 1982
- Dissotrocha decembullata Koste, 1996
- Dissotrocha guyanensis Rougier & Pourriot, 2006
- Dissotrocha hertzogi Hauer, 1939
- Dissotrocha kostei Segers, 2007
- Dissotrocha macrostyla (Ehrenberg, 1838)
- Dissotrocha pectinata Murray, 1911
- Dissotrocha schlienzi Hauer, 1956
- Dissotrocha scutellata Bartoš, 1950
- Dissotrocha spinosa (Bryce, 1892)
