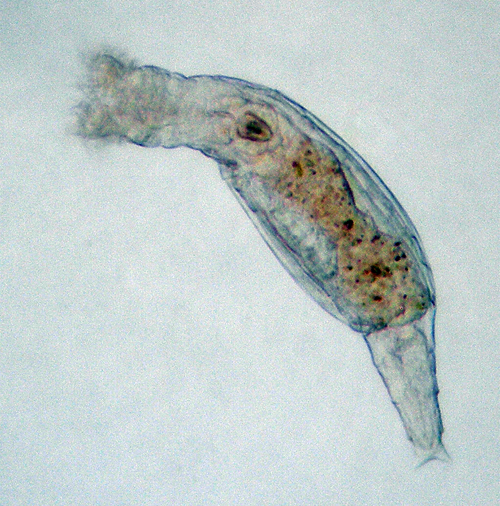
- Habrotrocha rosa

Scientific classification
- Kingdom: Animalia
- Phylum: Rotifera
- Class: Bdelloidea
- Order: Bdelloida
- Family: Habrotrochidae
- Genus: Habrotrocha; Bryce, 1910

Species
- see text

= Habrotrocha =

Habrotrocha Temporal range: Eocene–Recent

Genus of rotifers

Habrotrocha is a genus of bdelloid rotifers.

Late Eocene fossils of Habrotrocha in Dominican amber are among the oldest known fossil rotiferans.

Habrotrochid rotifers seem to have persisted for 35 million years with very little change in morphology or ecological role.

== Species ==
Habrotrocha contains the following species:

- Habrotrocha acornis Murray, 1911
- Habrotrocha alacris Milne, 1916
- Habrotrocha amphichlaena De Koning, 1947
- Habrotrocha ampulla Murray, 1911
- Habrotrocha angularis (Murray, 1910)
- Habrotrocha angusticollis (Murray, 1905)
- Habrotrocha annulata (Murray, 1905)
- Habrotrocha antarctica Iakovenko, Smykla, Convey, Kasparona, Kozeretska, Trokhymets, Dykyy, Plewka, Devetter & Janko, 2015
- Habrotrocha appendiculata Murray, 1911
- Habrotrocha aspera (Bryce, 1892)
- Habrotrocha baradlana Varga, 1963
- Habrotrocha bartosi Koniar, 1955
- Habrotrocha bidens (Gosse, 1851)
- Habrotrocha brocklehursti Murray, 1911
- Habrotrocha bulbosa Wulfert, 1961
- Habrotrocha calosa Wulfert, 1942
- Habrotrocha caudata Murray, 1911
- Habrotrocha changhoi Song & Lee, 2024
- Habrotrocha collaris (Ehrenberg, 1832)
- Habrotrocha colliflectens Bartoš, 1944
- Habrotrocha constricta (Dujardin, 1841)
- Habrotrocha crassa Donner, 1949
- Habrotrocha crenata (Murray, 1905)
- Habrotrocha cucullata Murray, 1911
- Habrotrocha cuneata Murray, 1913
- Habrotrocha curva De Koning, 1947
- Habrotrocha curvicollis Bartoš, 1951
- Habrotrocha devetteri Iakovenko, 2015
- Habrotrocha diarthrantenna De Koning, 1947
- Habrotrocha elegans (Milne, 1886)
- Habrotrocha elliptica Bartoš, 1963
- Habrotrocha elusa Milne, 1916
- Habrotrocha eremita (Bryce, 1894)
- Habrotrocha filum Donner, 1949
- Habrotrocha flava Bryce, 1915
- Habrotrocha flaviformis De Koning, 1947
- Habrotrocha fuhrmanni Heinis, 1914
- Habrotrocha fusca (Bryce, 1894)
- Habrotrocha fuscochlaena De Koning, 1947
- Habrotrocha gibbosa De Koning, 1947
- Habrotrocha gracilis Montet, 1915
- Habrotrocha granulata De Koning, 1947
- Habrotrocha gulosa Milne, 1916
- Habrotrocha haighi Örstan & Plewka, 2017
- Habrotrocha heinisi Bartoš, 1951
- Habrotrocha humilis Schulte, 1954
- Habrotrocha incola Bartoš, 1951
- Habrotrocha iners Milne, 1916
- Habrotrocha insignis Bryce, 1915
- Habrotrocha komareki Bartoš, 1944
- Habrotrocha lamellata Bartoš, 1951
- Habrotrocha lata (Bryce, 1892)
- Habrotrocha leitgebii (Zelinka, 1886)
- Habrotrocha levis Donner, 1951
- Habrotrocha ligula Bryce, 1913
- Habrotrocha longicalcarata Bērziņš, 1950
- Habrotrocha longiceps (Murray, 1906)
- Habrotrocha longula Bryce, 1915
- Habrotrocha maculata Murray, 1911
- Habrotrocha mediocris Donner, 1951
- Habrotrocha megalocephala De Koning, 1947
- Habrotrocha microcephala (Murray, 1906)
- Habrotrocha microcornis Song & Lee, 2024
- Habrotrocha minima De Koning, 1947
- Habrotrocha minuta (Murray, 1908)
- Habrotrocha munda Bryce, 1913
- Habrotrocha murrayi Bartoš, 1951
- Habrotrocha nodosa (Murray, 1906)
- Habrotrocha nodulata De Koning, 1947
- Habrotrocha novemdens De Koning, 1947
- Habrotrocha parvipes Donner, 1951
- Habrotrocha pavida Bryce, 1915
- Habrotrocha perforata (Murray, 1906) Species Habrotrocha pertinax Milne, 1916
- Habrotrocha placida Milne, 1916
- Habrotrocha plana Milne, 1916
- Habrotrocha porrecta Bērziņš, 1950
- Habrotrocha praelonga De Koning, 1947
- Habrotrocha puella Donner, 1950
- Habrotrocha pulchra (Murray, 1905)
- Habrotrocha pusilla (Bryce, 1893)
- Habrotrocha quinquedens De Koning, 1947
- Habrotrocha rara Donner, 1949
- Habrotrocha reclusa (Milne, 1889)
- Habrotrocha roeperi (Milne, 1889)
- Habrotrocha rosa Donner, 1949
- Habrotrocha scabropyga Bartoš, 1958
- Habrotrocha scepanotrochoides De Koning, 1947
- Habrotrocha schultei Donner, 1965
- Habrotrocha serpens Donner, 1949
- Habrotrocha solida Donner, 1949
- Habrotrocha solitaria Donner, 1949
- Habrotrocha sollicita Donner, 1949
- Habrotrocha soror Donner, 1950
- Habrotrocha spicula Bryce, 1913
- Habrotrocha stenochlaena De Koning, 1947
- Habrotrocha stenostephana Schulte, 1954
- Habrotrocha strangulata Murray, 1911
- Habrotrocha subtilis Donner, 1965
- Habrotrocha sylvestris Bryce, 1915
- Habrotrocha thermalis Pax & Wulfert, 1942
- Habrotrocha thienemanni Hauer, 1924
- Habrotrocha tranquilla Milne, 1916
- Habrotrocha tridens (Milne, 1886)
- Habrotrocha tridentata De Koning, 1947
- Habrotrocha trilobata Bartoš, 1948
- Habrotrocha tripus (Murray, 1907)
- Habrotrocha valida Milne, 1916
- Habrotrocha vernadskii Iakovenko, Smykla, Convey, Kasparona, Kozeretska, Trokhymets, Dykyy, Plewka, Devetter & Janko, 2015
- Habrotrocha vicina Donner, 1980
- Habrotrocha visa Donner, 1954
