= Fumigaclavine A dimethylallyltransferase =

Identifiers
- EC no.: 2.5.1.100

Databases
- IntEnz: IntEnz view
- BRENDA: BRENDA entry
- ExPASy: NiceZyme view
- KEGG: KEGG entry
- MetaCyc: metabolic pathway
- PRIAM: profile
- PDB structures: RCSB PDB PDBe PDBsum
Search
- PMC: articles
- PubMed: articles
- NCBI: proteins

Fumigaclavine A dimethylallyltransferase (EC 2.5.1.100, FgaPT1) is an enzyme with systematic name dimethylallyl-diphosphate:fumigaclavine A dimethylallyltransferase. It catalyses the following chemical reaction

dimethylallyl pyrophosphate
+
fumigaclavine A
PP_{i}
fumigaclavine C

Fumigaclavine C is an ergot alkaloid produced by some fungi of the Trichocomaceae family and was characterised from Aspergillus fumigatus.
