= Pleuretra =

Scientific classification
- Kingdom: Animalia
- Phylum: Rotifera
- Class: Bdelloidea
- Order: Bdelloida
- Family: Philodinidae
- Genus: Pleuretra; Bryce, 1910

Genus of rotifers

Pleuretra is a genus of rotifers belonging to the family Philodinidae.

The species of this genus are found in North America.

Species:

- Pleuretra africana Murray, 1911
- Pleuretra alpium (Ehrenberg, 1853)
- Pleuretra bovicornis Bartoš, 1963
- Pleuretra brycei (Weber, 1898)
- Pleuretra costata (Bartoš, 1938)
- Pleuretra humerosa (Murray, 1905)
- Pleuretra hystrix Bartoš, 1950
- Pleuretra intermedia (Bartoš, 1938)
- Pleuretra lineata Donner, 1962
- Pleuretra proxima Bartoš, 1963
- Pleuretra reticulata Milne, 1916
- Pleuretra similis Bartoš, 1963
- Pleuretra sulcata Bartoš, 1950
- Pleuretra triangularis Murray, 1913
