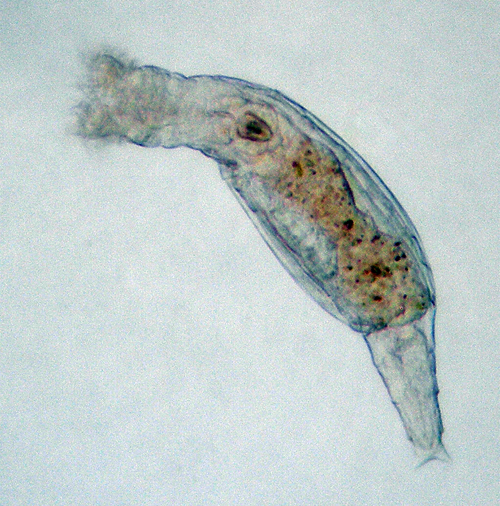
- Habrotrocha rosa

Scientific classification
- Domain: Eukaryota
- Kingdom: Animalia
- Phylum: Rotifera
- Class: Bdelloidea
- Order: Bdelloida
- Family: Habrotrochidae

= Habrotrochidae =

Family of rotifers

Habrotrochidae is a family of rotifers belonging to the order Bdelloida.

Genera:

- Habrotrocha Bryce, 1910
- Otostephanos Milne, 1916
- Scepanotrocha Bryce, 1910
