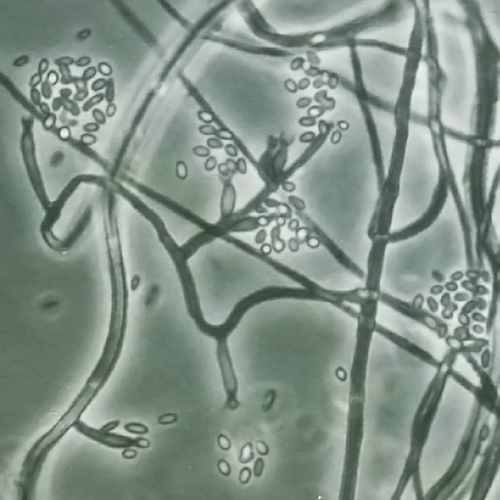

Scientific classification
- Kingdom: Fungi
- Division: Ascomycota
- Class: Eurotiomycetes
- Order: Chaetothyriales
- Family: Herpotrichiellaceae
- Genus: Phialophora
- Species: P. fastigiata

Binomial name
- Phialophora fastigiata (Lagerb. & Melin) Conant (1937)

Synonyms
- Cadophora fastigiata Lagerb. & Melin (1928)

= Phialophora fastigiata =

Species of fungus

Phialophora fastigiata is a mitosporic, saprophytic fungus commonly found in soil, and on wood, and wood-pulp. This species was initially placed in the genus Cadophora but was later transferred to the genus Phialophora based on morphological and growth characteristics. In culture, P. fastigiata produces olive-brown, velvety colonies. The fungus is recognizable microscopically due to the presence of distinctive, funnel-shaped cuffs (collarettes) encircling the tips of phialides that bear slimy conidia. The fungus is often implicated in soft-rot wood decay due to its ability to degrade lignin, cellulose and pectin. It has also been reported to cause blue staining of wood and wood pulp.

== History and taxonomy ==
Phialophora fastigiata was originally described in 1928 as Cadophora fastigiata by Lagerberg and Melin, who erected the genus Cadophora to accommodate C. fastigiata. In 1937, Conant compared eight species of Cadophora with Phialophora verrucosa and determined that they belonged to the same genus. As such, seven species of Cadophora, including C. fastigiata were transferred to the genus Phialophora. Although later examination of the internal transcribed spacers of ribosomal DNA (rDNA) genes in Cadophora melinii and P. fastigiata showed morphological similarity, the colony morphology of the two species is distinctive.

== Growth and morphology ==
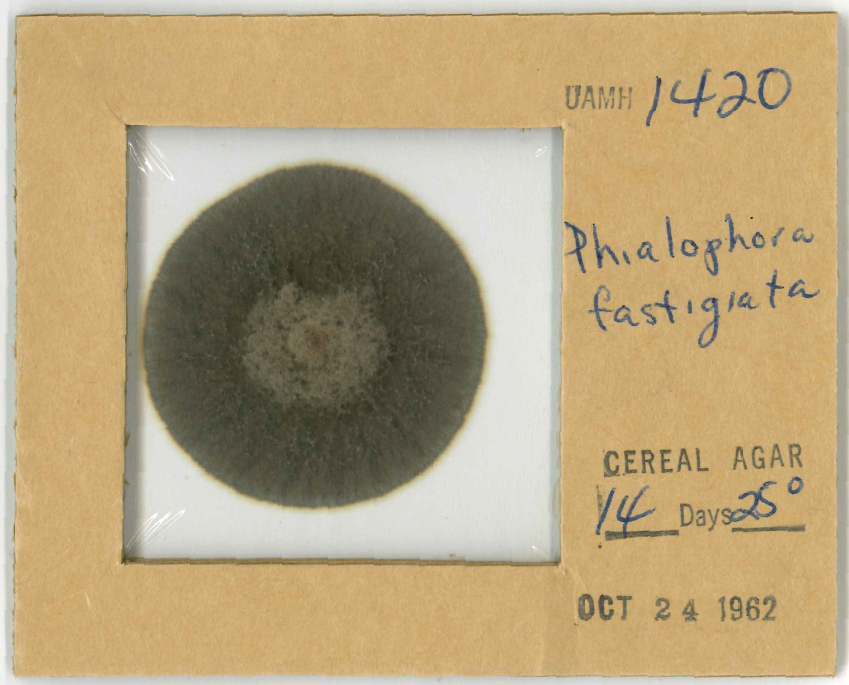
Dried colony of Phialophora fastigiata UAMH 1420 on cellophane

Macroscopically, P. fastigiata colonies reach 2.3–2.5 cm (0.91–0.98 in) in diameter after being grown at 20 °C on malt extract agar for 10 days. They exhibit an olive-brown or reddish-brown velvety appearance, and grow with a border of hyaline (glassy) mycelium. Aerial mycelium form a floccose (fluffy) greyish-brown turf 1.0-6.5mm high, and produce rope-like strands towards the centre of the colony. Although isolates usually grow uniformly, slight differences in colour, numbers of conidiophores and numbers of aerial mycelium have been observed.

Phialophora fastigiata are microscopically recognized by the production of light brown, flask-shaped phialides that are produced laterally on hyphae and produce funnel-shaped collarettes. In Petri dish cultures, the fungus tends to develop hyphal strands that are 3-4μm in diameter and show cell-wall thickening with age. Slimy conidia are produced in clumps at the apex of phialides, and are oval shaped (ovoid) to button shaped (ellipsoidal) with a pinched base. The conidia initially exhibit a hyaline (unpigmented) appearance, but turn light brown with age.

== Physiology ==
Isolates of P. fastigiata are able to grow at temperatures ranging from 3 °C to 35 °C, with an optimum temperature range of 20 °C–25 °C and pH range between 4–9. Extracts of water and acetone from balsam fir, black spruce, white spruce and red spruce have been shown to stimulate the growth of the fungus in culture. The presence of biotin also increases the growth of this fungus and extracts of ammonium tartrate increase mycelium production. This saprophytic fungus is able to gain energy from decaying organic matter, and is able to utilize asparagine and potassium nitrate as sources of nitrogen, as well as L-arabinose as a source of carbon.

Phialophora fastigiata is able to produce a variety of degradation enzymes, including pectinase, amylase, xylanase, cellulase and mannanase, which allow it to cause wood decay and post-harvest rot. Although there has been no investigation into the management of P. fastigiata, the fungus is known to be susceptible to the antimicrobial activity of ethanolic extract from Halacsya sendtneri, a flowering plant in the family Boraginaceae. The fungus is also susceptible to antimycins produced by Streptomyces species. Conversely, P. fastigiata exhibits antimicrobial activity against Gaeumannomyces graminis var tritici, a plant pathogen that causes take-all disease in wheat.

== Habitat and ecology ==
Phialophora fastigiata is commonly isolated from soil and wood. The earliest reports of the fungus came from countries and regions rich in wood, such as Sweden, Norway and Canada. It was later isolated from a spruce plantation in Norway and has been found to grow on wood pulp in Sweden. It is also the most abundant species found in slime from paper mills in New Brunswick and Newfoundland, and has been isolated from wheat-field soils in Western Australia.

The fungus is psychrotolerant (able to grow at low temperatures), and has been isolated from soil, straw and wood in the Ross Sea region of Antarctica. It has also been isolated from the water-saturated wood of Betula pendula trees, dialysis water, municipal drinking water, groundwater, surface water, and tap water.

== Commercial implications ==
Phialophora fastigiata is a soft rot fungus that has been found to widen cavities in birch and Scots pine sapwood by increasing growth at the hyphal tip and secreting lignolytic enzymes (involved in the degradation of lignin) from the hyphal surface. The fungus can also cause cavities in wood and plants via an erosion-type attack. The ability of the fungus to degrade the wood of Populus tremuloides (trembling aspen) has been noted to limit the sale of aspen, which represents 54% of commercial timber.

P. fastigiata also commonly causes blue staining of wood. It has been found to grow on wood pulp with a greyish-green tinge, causing the wood pulp to appear blue and is one of the most common species of fungi associated with discolored xylem in the stems of B. pendula. Degradation and discoloration of wood by P. fastigiata affect the production quality of pulp and paper.
