= 9-Deacetoxyfumigaclavine C =

Names
- IUPAC name 6,8β-Dimethyl-2-(2-methylbut-3-en-2-yl)ergoline
- Systematic IUPAC name (6aR,9R,10aR)-7,9-Dimethyl-5-(2-methylbut-3-en-2-yl)-4,6,6a,7,8,9,10,10a-octahydroindolo[4,3-fg]quinoline

Identifiers
CAS Number	1137244-08-6
3D model (JSmol)	Interactive image
ChemSpider	24626669
PubChem CID	44715304
- InChI: InChI=1S/C21H28N2/c1-6-21(3,4)20-16-11-18-15(10-13(2)12-23(18)5)14-8-7-9-17(22-20)19(14)16/h6-9,13,15,18,22H,1,10-12H2,2-5H3/t13-,15-,18-/m1/s1 Key: GXEMWNLJOIOIIM-DDUZABMNSA-N
- SMILES: [H][C@@]12CC3=C(NC4=C3C(=CC=C4)[C@@]1([H])C[C@@H](C)CN2C)C(C)(C)C=C

Properties
Chemical formula	C_{21}H_{28}N_{2}
Molar mass	308.469 g·mol^{−1}
- Except where otherwise noted, data are given for materials in their standard state (at 25 °C [77 °F], 100 kPa). Infobox references

9-Deacetoxyfumigaclavine C is an ergoline alkaloid. It is a potent, selective, anticancer compound, with in vitro activity comparable to doxorubicin (IC_{50} = 3.1 μM against K562). 9-Deacetoxyfumigaclavine C is a compound made by a variety of fungi.
