= Cadophora malorum =

Scientific classification
- Kingdom: Fungi
- Division: Ascomycota
- Class: Leotiomycetes
- Order: Helotiales
- Family: Ploettnerulaceae
- Genus: Cadophora
- Species: C. malorum

Binomial name
- Cadophora malorum (Kidd & Beaumont) W. Gams, (2000)

Synonyms
- Phialophora malorum (Kidd & Beaumont) McColloch, (1944); Sporotrichum carpogenum Ruehle, (1931); Sporotrichum malorum Kidd & Beaumont, (1924); Phialophora atra J.F.H.Beyma, Antonie van Leeuwenhoek (1942); Torula heteroderae Jacz., Bull. (1934); Phialophora heteroderae (J.F.H.Beyma) J.F.H.Beyma(1937); Cadophora heteroderae J.F.H.Beyma (1937)

Species of fungus

Cadophora malorum is a saprophytic plant pathogen that causes side rot in apple and pear and can also cause disease on asparagus and kiwifruit. C. malorum has been found parasitizing shrimp and other fungal species in the extreme environments of the Mid-Atlantic Ridge, and can be categorized as a halophilic psychrotrophic fungus and a marine fungus.

== Taxonomy ==
Cadophora malorum was first described as Sporotrichum malorum in 1924 by Mary Nest Kidd and Albert Beaumont, from a specimen collected on an apple tree in Britain, but in 2000 was transferred to the genus, Cadophora, by Walter Gams, a German mycologist. Extensive gene analysis has been done confirming the work of Walter Gams and categorizing C. malorum in the genus of Cadophora and distinguishing it from the previously named genus Phialophora.

== Description ==
C. malorum is classified as a part of the Ascomycota division, because of the presence of asci and ascospores in its sexual reproductive lifecycle. C. malorum also shares typical morphological qualities with the Leotiomycetes class, Helotiales order, and the Ploettnerulaceae family. The Capophora genus has also been shown to be classified as ectomycorrhizal fungi (ECM fungi) and as dark septate endophytes (DSE).

=== Pathogenicity ===
C. malorum has been observed to infect pears during the post-harvest stage. C. malorum does not however infect pears until after some decay has already occurred. The source of inoculum for C. malorum has been shown to be in the soil, where the spores can overwinter and survive all year round off of nutrients released into the soil from decaying fruit. C. malorum can infect wounded bark and cause cankers to form in the trunk of the infected tree. C. malorum also can cause dieback in the leaves and fruit through wilting, yellowing, and necrosis of the plant. This has been known to happen on sunflower plants and kiwi trees.

Research has been conducted with isolation of C. malorum from shrimp and other fungal species, but research was not specific about how C. malorum infects organisms outside of the plantae kingdom. There is a lot of potential for further research in this area as it is rare for fungal species to be able to infect both plants and animals.

== Geographical Distribution ==
C. malorum has been documented to be found parasitizing organisms all over the globe, showing up in research done in Slovenia, Russia, Chile, United States, Germany, Italy, along with various other countries. C. malorum has also been found in moderate to extreme environments such as the Mid-Atlantic Ridge and Antarctica.

== Future research potential ==
Marine-derived fungi, like C. malorum, have been used to research biotechnological advances for a long time. Fungi have been used to create many modern products that are still used today, such as: dyes, flavors, fragrances, hallucinogens, poisons, and pesticides.

=== Medical ===
Marine fungi produce valuable secondary metabolites that can lead to innovations in potential drug-therapies. The secondary metabolites in C. malorum give an advantage for its own pathogenicity, but can also be used in developing beneficial pharmaceuticals, different food additives, and types of perfumes.

=== Biotechnological ===
C. malorum was discovered to possess these secondary metabolites along with genes encoding for carbohydrate-active enzymes, signifying that these genes have been adapted to extreme environments and thus have high biotechnological potential. C. malorum secondary metabolites can be used to develop various pesticides such as insecticides. Using living organisms as a pest control mechanism has been proven to be a useful, environmentally conscious, and sustainable method rather than the typical chemicals used.
