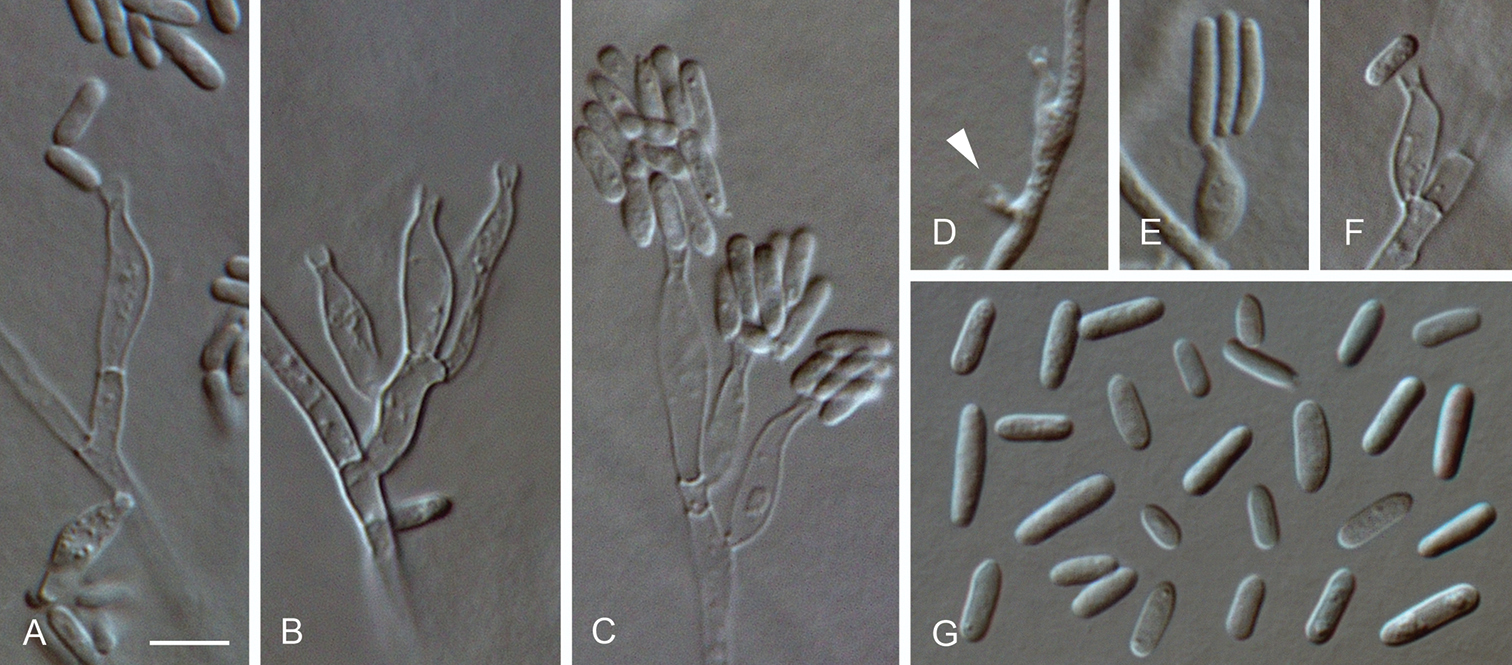
- C. luteo-olivacea. A–F conidiophores and conidiogenous cells (arrow indicates a short neck); G conidia. Scale bar: 5 μm

Scientific classification
- Domain: Eukaryota
- Kingdom: Fungi
- Division: Ascomycota
- Class: Leotiomycetes
- Order: Helotiales
- Family: Ploettnerulaceae
- Genus: Cadophora; Lagerb. & Melin (1927)

Type species
- Cadophora fastigiata Lagerb. & Melin (1927)

= Cadophora =

Genus of fungi

Cadophora is a genus of fungi belonging to the family Ploettnerulaceae.

The genus was first described by Karl Erik Torsten Lagerberg and Melin.

The genus has a cosmopolitan distribution.

Species:

- Cadophora fastigiata
- Cadophora finlandica
- Cadophora luteo-olivacea
- Cadophora malorum
