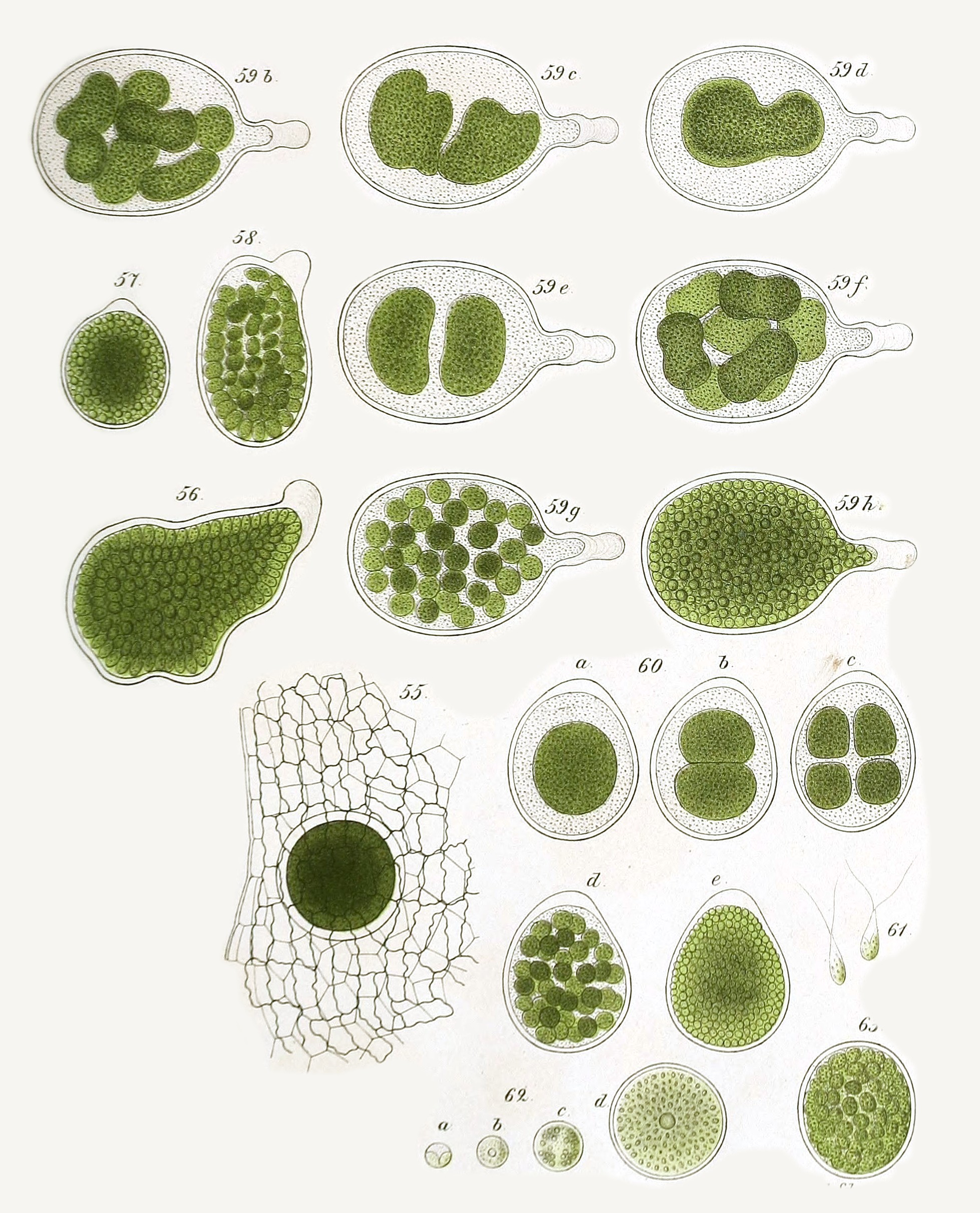

Scientific classification
- Clade: Viridiplantae
- Division: Chlorophyta
- Class: Ulvophyceae
- Order: Scotinosphaerales
- Family: Scotinosphaeraceae
- Genus: Scotinosphaera
- Species: S. paradoxa

Binomial name
- Scotinosphaera paradoxa Klebs, 1881

= Scotinosphaera paradoxa =

Species of alga

Scotinosphaera paradoxa is a species of alga belonging to the family Scotinosphaeraceae.

Synonym:

- Kentrosphaera facciolaae Borzì, 1883
