= Luticola desmetii =

Scientific classification
- Domain: Eukaryota
- Clade: Sar
- Clade: Stramenopiles
- Division: Ochrophyta
- Clade: Bacillariophyta
- Class: Bacillariophyceae
- Order: incertae sedis
- Genus: Luticola
- Species: L. desmetii

Binomial name
- Luticola desmetii Kopalová et al. 2011

Species of single-celled organism

Luticola desmetii is a species of non-marine diatom first found in lakes of James Ross Island.
