= Macrotrachela =

Scientific classification
- Kingdom: Animalia
- Phylum: Rotifera
- Class: Bdelloidea
- Order: Bdelloida
- Family: Philodinidae
- Genus: Macrotrachela; Milne, 1886

Genus of rotifers

Macrotrachela is a genus of rotifers belonging to the family Philodinidae.

The species of this genus are found in Europe, Northern America and southernmost parts of the Southern Hemisphere.

== Species ==
Species:

- Macrotrachela aculeata Milne, 1886
- Macrotrachela allani (Murray, 1911)
- Macrotrachela ambigua Donner, 1965
