= Penicillium jensenii =

Scientific classification
- Kingdom: Fungi
- Division: Ascomycota
- Class: Eurotiomycetes
- Order: Eurotiales
- Family: Aspergillaceae
- Genus: Penicillium
- Species: P. jensenii

Binomial name
- Penicillium jensenii Zalessky, K.M. 1927

Type strain
- ATCC 10456, ATCC 18317, CBS 216.28, CBS 327.59, CECT 20381, DSM 2741, FAT 605, FRR 0909, FRR 3431, IFO 5747, IFO 5764, IMI 039768, IMI 068233, LCP 89.1389, MUCL 38773, NBRC 5747, NBRC 5764, NRRL 3431, NRRL 909, QM 7298, QM, Thom 5010-10, VKM F-1147

Synonyms
- Penicillium rivolii, Penicillium siemaszki, Penicillium siemaszkoi

Species of fungus

Penicillium jensenii is an anamorph species of the genus of Penicillium which produces citrinin, griseofulvin and fumagillin.
