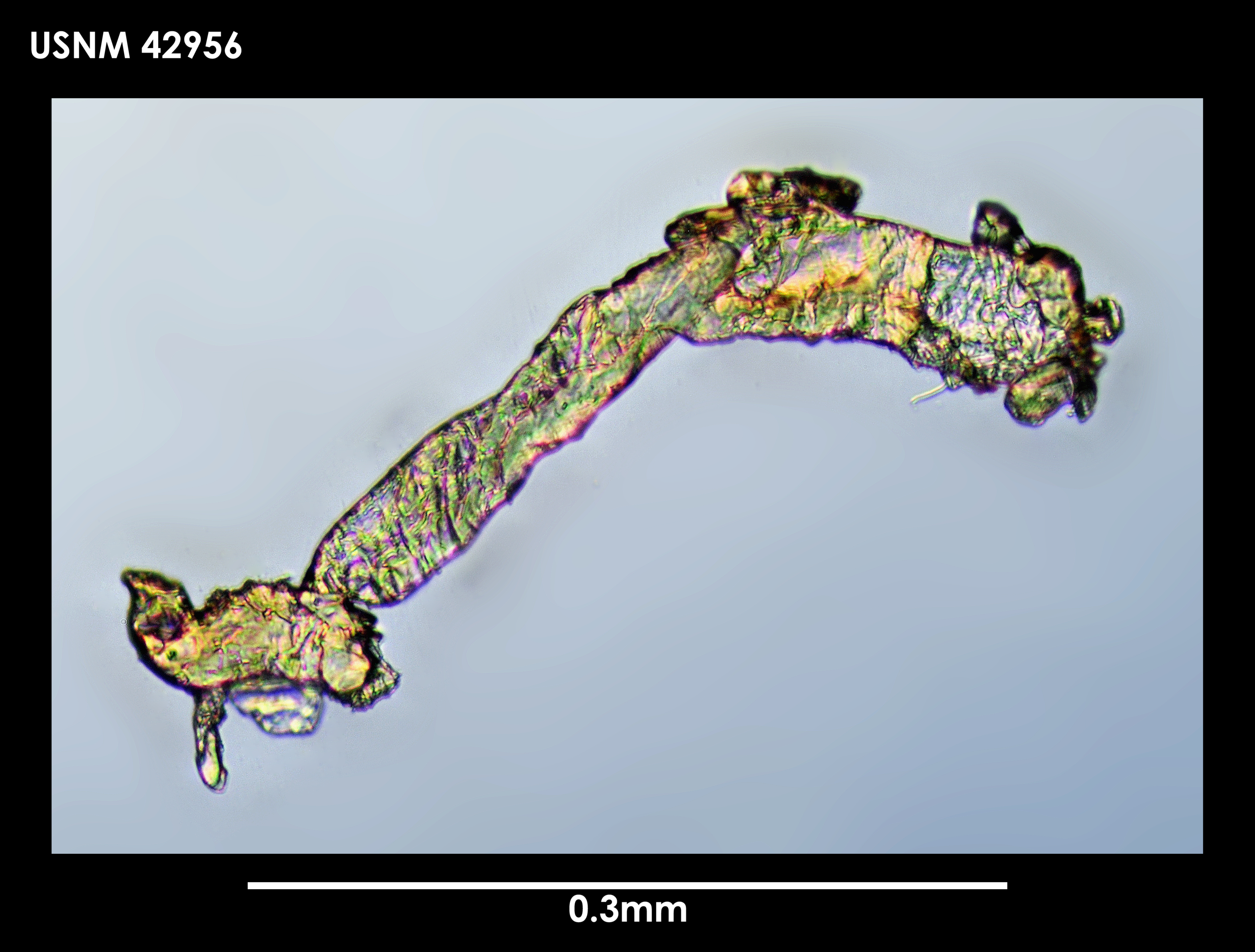
- Holotype specimen

Scientific classification
- Kingdom: Animalia
- Phylum: Nematoda
- Class: Chromadorea
- Order: Rhabditida
- Family: Cephalobidae
- Genus: Scottnema
- Species: S. lindsayae

Binomial name
- Scottnema lindsayae Timm, 1971

= Scottnema lindsayae =

Species of roundworm

Scottnema lindsayae is a species of nematode belonging to the family Cephalobidae. First described in 1971, it is endemic to Antarctica and most commonly found in the McMurdo Dry Valleys. S. lindsayae, a microscopic worm, feeds on microbes, including bacteria, yeast, and algae. Adapted to very cold and dry climates, its population may be decreasing as a result of climate change.

== Taxonomy ==
S. lindsayae is the only described member of Scottnema. Originally described by R. W. Timm (1971), it was named after the polar explorer Robert Scott and the collector of the holotype specimen, Kay Lindsay.

== Description and lifecycle ==
S. lindsayae is between half a millimeter and a millimeter in length and between two and four micrometers in width. S. lindsayae reproduces sexually, with females laying eggs. The minimum observed lifecycle length at 10 °C (50 °F) is 218 days, with four juvenile stages outside of the egg. As it enters hibernation during Antarctic winters, S. lindsayae likely needs more than one summer to complete one lifecycle. Temperatures above 10 °C (50 °F) were harmful to its reproductive cycle, with development being significantly impaired at 15 °C (59 °F). As a result, significantly warming temperatures in Antarctic may pose a threat to this species. In 2006, the population had decreased by 65% since 1993.

== Habitat ==
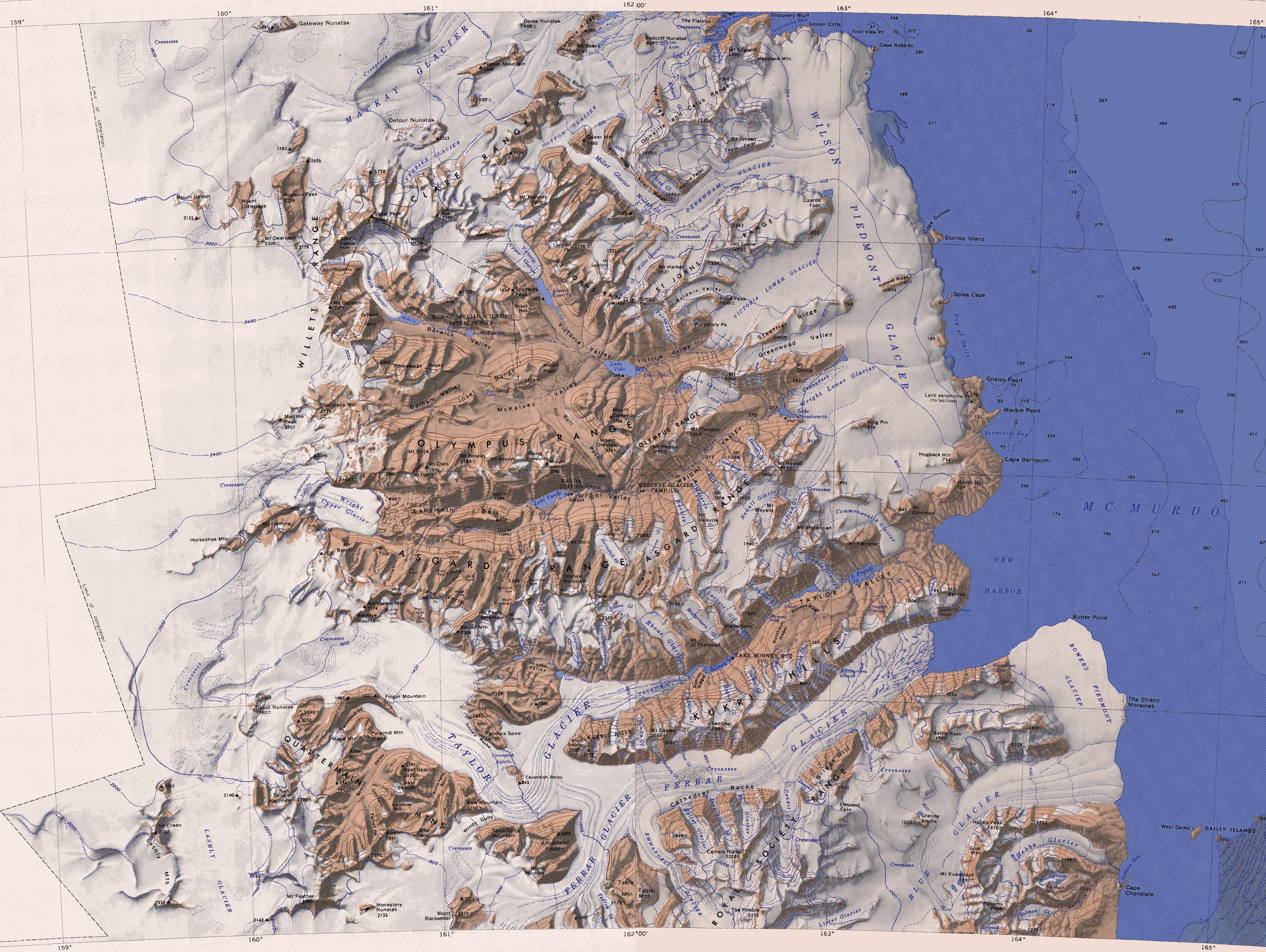
Map of the McMurdo Dry Valleys in Antarctica

S. lindsayae is one of three nematodes found in the soil of the McMurdo Dry Valleys, and the only one endemic to the continent. It has also been found in other parts of Antarctica, including East Ongul Island and Admiralty Bay. In the dry valleys, S. lindsayae is the dominant nematode, representing about 80% of the worms recorded, especially in the colder and drier parts where other species often cannot be found. It is also more common at higher altitudes. Found as far south as 83.48 degrees, it is the southernmost worm species recorded.
