= Indolepropionamide =

Names
- Preferred IUPAC name 3-(1H-Indol-3-yl)propanamide
- Other names 3-Indolepropionamide; Indole-3-propanamide

Identifiers
CAS Number	5814-93-7
3D model (JSmol)	Interactive image
ChemSpider	312353
PubChem CID	351791
UNII	6RD94WRM73
CompTox Dashboard (EPA)	DTXSID40326054
- InChI: InChI=1S/C11H12N2O/c12-11(14)6-5-8-7-13-10-4-2-1-3-9(8)10/h1-4,7,13H,5-6H2,(H2,12,14) Key: OTVHXWFANORBAK-UHFFFAOYSA-N
- SMILES: c1ccc2c(c1)c(c[nH]2)CCC(=O)N

Properties
Chemical formula	C_{11}H_{12}N_{2}O
Molar mass	188.230 g·mol^{−1}
- Except where otherwise noted, data are given for materials in their standard state (at 25 °C [77 °F], 100 kPa). Infobox references

Indolepropionamide (IPAM) is a chemical compound, an indole derivative with the molecular formula C_{11}H_{12}N_{2}O. In vivo (rats), IPAM markedly reduced the proton potential collapse induced by the mitochondrial toxins to nearly baseline levels in both young and old rats and demonstrated free-radical scavenging properties. IPAM was shown to increase complex I and complex IV activity in the mitochondrial electron transport chain, however complex II and complex III were left unchanged. Decreased activity of complexes I and IV results in an inhibition of electron transport that is associated with higher production of ROS. IPAM can also act as a recyclable electron and proton carrier, facilitating reversible endogenous radical and redox reactions, and thereby enabling the formation of a proton gradient that drives mitochondrial ATP synthesis. Thus, IPAM acts as a stabilizer of energy metabolism in mitochondria, thereby reducing the production of reactive oxygen species.

IPAM-treated rotifers (Philodina acuticornis) had a lifespan extended by approximately 300%, the number of offspring increased by 3.4 times and body length increased by 1.47 times, in comparison with IPAM-untreated rotifers. Researchers noted that such a lifespan extension in this particular rotifer species is the highest that was ever observed to date in any study. Indolepropionamide shows potential as an anti-aging molecule, a mitochondrial metabolism modifier and may have a therapeutic value in age-related neurodegenerative, and mitochondrial diseases.

In rodents, IPAM was detected as endogenously occurring and its levels can be slightly increased after administration of L-tryptophan (but not indole-3-propionic acid or melatonin). IPAM has high bioavailability as it can efficiently cross the blood-brain barrier and remain at high concentrations in rat brains for several hours. In rats, IPAM was administered at a dosage of 0.5 mg/kg.

== See also ==
- 3-Indolepropionic acid
