= Fumigaclavine B =

Names
- Other names (8β,9β)-6,8-Dimethylergolin-9-ol

Identifiers
CAS Number	6879-93-2
3D model (JSmol)	Interactive image
ChEBI	CHEBI:67156
ChEMBL	ChEMBL2229125
ChemSpider	28533139
KEGG	C20437
PubChem CID	21589072
UNII	TBQ33F7DSR
- InChI: InChI=1S/C16H20N2O/c1-9-8-18(2)13-6-10-7-17-12-5-3-4-11(14(10)12)15(13)16(9)19/h3-5,7,9,13,15-17,19H,6,8H2,1-2H3/t9-,13-,15-,16+/m1/s1 Key: JUXRVSRUBIFVKE-BBDZHYCFSA-N
- SMILES: C[C@H]1CN([C@@H]2Cc3c[nH]c4c3c(ccc4)[C@H]2[C@H]1O)C

Properties
Chemical formula	C_{16}H_{20}N_{2}O
Molar mass	256.349 g·mol^{−1}
- Except where otherwise noted, data are given for materials in their standard state (at 25 °C [77 °F], 100 kPa). Infobox references

Fumigaclavine B is an ergoline compound made in fungi including Aspergillus fumigatus.

Both 8α and 8β diastereomers (epimers) were named fumigaclavine B in scientific literature.

== See also ==
- Fumigaclavine A
- Fumigaclavine C
- Fumigaclavine B O-acetyltransferase
