= Fumigaclavine C =

- 8β isomer

Names
- IUPAC name [(6aR,9S,10S)-7,9-Dimethyl-5-(2-methylbut-3-en-2-yl)-6,6a,8,9,10,10a-hexahydro-4H-indolo[4,3-fg]quinoline-10-yl] acetate
- Other names SM-1; (8β,9β)-2-(1,1-Dimethyl-2-propenyl)-6,8-dimethylergolin-9-ol acetate

Identifiers
| CAS Number | 62867-47-4 |
| 3D model (JSmol) | Interactive image |
| ChEBI | CHEBI:64673 |
| ChemSpider | 28184662 |
| KEGG | C20438 |
| PubChem CID | 57339223 |
| CompTox Dashboard (EPA) | DTXSID60978599 |
- InChI: InChI=1S/C23H30N2O2/c1-7-23(4,5)22-16-11-18-20(15-9-8-10-17(24-22)19(15)16)21(27-14(3)26)13(2)12-25(18)6/h7-10,13,18,20-21,24H,1,11-12H2,2-6H3/t13-,18+,20+,21-/m0/s1 Key: OSICWVVWEXKSBD-LFAYTRTRSA-N
- SMILES: C[C@H]1CN([C@@H]2CC3=C(NC4=CC=CC(=C34)C2[C@H]1OC(=O)C)C(C)(C)C=C)C

Properties
| Chemical formula | C_{23}H_{30}N_{2}O_{2} |
| Molar mass | 366.505 g·mol^{−1} |
- Except where otherwise noted, data are given for materials in their standard state (at 25 °C [77 °F], 100 kPa). Infobox references

Fumigaclavine C is an ergoline alkaloid produced by Aspergillus fumigatus.

Both 8α and 8β diastereomers (epimers) were named fumigaclavine C in scientific literature.

== Biosynthesis ==
The final step in the biosynthesis of the ergot alkaloid fumigaclavine C in fungi of the Trichocomaceae family is catalysed by the enzyme, fumigaclavine A dimethylallyltransferase:

dimethylallyl pyrophosphate
+
fumigaclavine A
PP_{i}
fumigaclavine C

The enzyme was characterised from Aspergillus fumigatus and produces the 8α stereoisomer shown.

== See also ==
- 9-Deacetoxyfumigaclavine C
- Fumigaclavine B
- Desformylflustrabromine
