= Penicillium janczewskii =

Scientific classification
- Kingdom: Fungi
- Division: Ascomycota
- Class: Eurotiomycetes
- Order: Eurotiales
- Family: Aspergillaceae
- Genus: Penicillium
- Species: P. janczewskii

Binomial name
- Penicillium janczewskii Zalessky, K.M. 1927

Type strain
- CBS 221.28, FRR 0919, IMI 191499, KCTC 6438, MUCL 38774, NRRL 919, Thom 5010.9

Synonyms
- Penicillium echinulatum, Penicillium sweicicikii, Penicillium swiecickii, Penicillium nigricans, Penicillium nigricans var. sulphureum, Penicillium granatense

Species of fungus

Penicillium janczewskii is an anamorph and filamentous species of the genus of Penicillium which was isolated from the rhizosphere of Vernonia herbacea. Penicillium janczewskii produces griseofulvin
