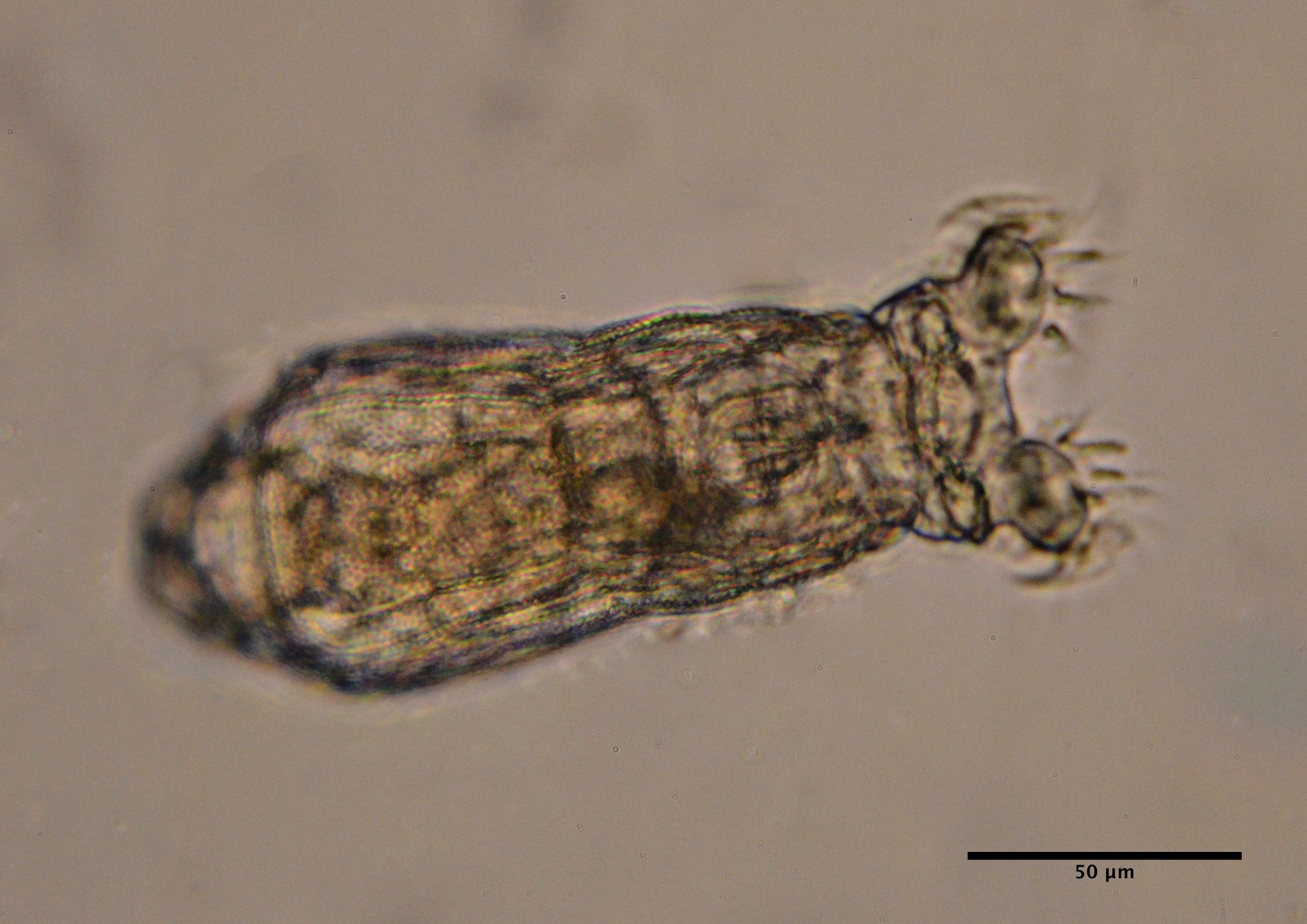
- Philodina rugosa

Scientific classification
- Kingdom: Animalia
- Phylum: Rotifera
- Class: Bdelloidea
- Order: Bdelloida
- Family: Philodinidae; Ehrenberg, 1838

= Philodinidae =

Family of rotifers

Philodinidae is a family of rotifers belonging to the order Bdelloidea.

== Genera ==
Genera:

- Anomopus Piovanelli, 1903
- Callidina Ehrenberg, 1830
- Ceratotrocha Bryce, 1910
- Didymodactylos Milne, 1916
- Dissotrocha Bryce, 1910
- Embata Bryce, 1910
- Esechielina Bory de St.Vincent, 1827
- Macrotrachela Milne, 1886
- Mniobia Bryce, 1910
- Philodina Ehrenberg, 1830
- Pleuretra Bryce, 1910
- Pseudoembata Wycliffe & Michael, 1968
- Rotaria Scopoli, 1777
- Zelinkiella Harring, 1913
