= David Lawrence Bryce =

Scottish marine zoologist

David Lawrence Bryce FRSE (1852–1934) was a Scottish marine zoologist and specialist in Rotifera.

== Life ==
He was born in Edinburgh in 1852 and educated at the Royal High School. Whilst still in his teens he left Edinburgh in 1871 and went to London where he became a businessman.

He was credited with building his own microscope and became a member of Hackney Microscopical Society in 1884, and the Quekett Microscopical Club in 1892.

Microscopes enabled him to explore the world of Rotifera and Bdelloida and he became an expert in this field. The article on Rotifers in the Encyclopædia Britannica bears his initials.

He was elected a Fellow of the Royal Society of Edinburgh in 1927, his proposer being Sir David Prain. He died on 26 October 1934 at Ascension Vicarage in Plumstead in Kent.

== Family ==
He married Kate Mowbray Styles in 1879. Their son was Rev David Lawrence Bryce (1880–1965).
