= Fumigaclavine A =

Names
- IUPAC name [(6aR,9R,10S)-7,9-Dimethyl-6,6a,8,9,10,10a-hexahydro-4H-indolo[4,3-fg]quinoline-10-yl] acetate
- Other names (8α,9β)-6,8-Dimethylergolin-9-ol acetate

Identifiers
CAS Number	6879-59-0
3D model (JSmol)	Interactive image
ChEBI	CHEBI:67159
ChemSpider	2299489
KEGG	C20436
PubChem CID	3035188
UNII	DV9FK5AO1K
CompTox Dashboard (EPA)	DTXSID40988499
- InChI: InChI=1S/C18H22N2O2/c1-10-9-20(3)15-7-12-8-19-14-6-4-5-13(16(12)14)17(15)18(10)22-11(2)21/h4-6,8,10,15,17-19H,7,9H2,1-3H3/t10-,15-,17-,18+/m1/s1 Key: GJSSYQDXZLZOLR-ONUGHKICSA-N
- SMILES: C[C@@H]1CN([C@@H]2CC3=CNC4=CC=CC(=C34)C2[C@H]1OC(=O)C)C

Properties
Chemical formula	C_{18}H_{22}N_{2}O_{2}
Molar mass	298.386 g·mol^{−1}
- Except where otherwise noted, data are given for materials in their standard state (at 25 °C [77 °F], 100 kPa). Infobox references

Fumigaclavine A is an antibacterial ergoline alkaloid produced by endophytic Aspergillus.

Both 8α and 8β diastereomers (epimers) were named fumigaclavine A in scientific literature.

== See also ==
- Fumigaclavine B
- Fumigaclavine C
- Fumigaclavine A dimethylallyltransferase
