= Adinetidae =

Scientific classification
- Domain: Eukaryota
- Kingdom: Animalia
- Phylum: Rotifera
- Class: Bdelloidea
- Order: Bdelloida
- Family: Adinetidae

Family of rotifers

Adinetidae is a family of rotifers belonging to the order Bdelloidea.

Genera:

- Adineta Hudson, 1886
- Bradyscela Bryce, 1910
