= Ecotoxicity =

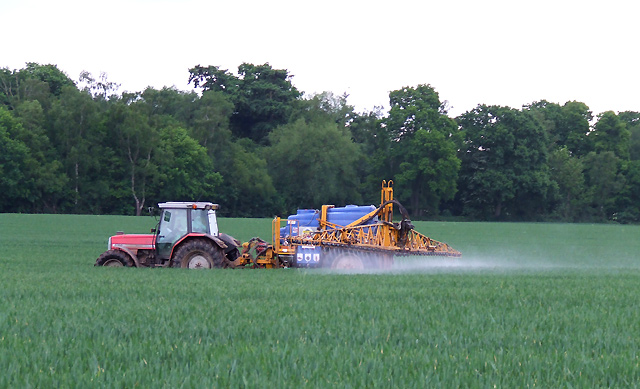
Pesticide distribution

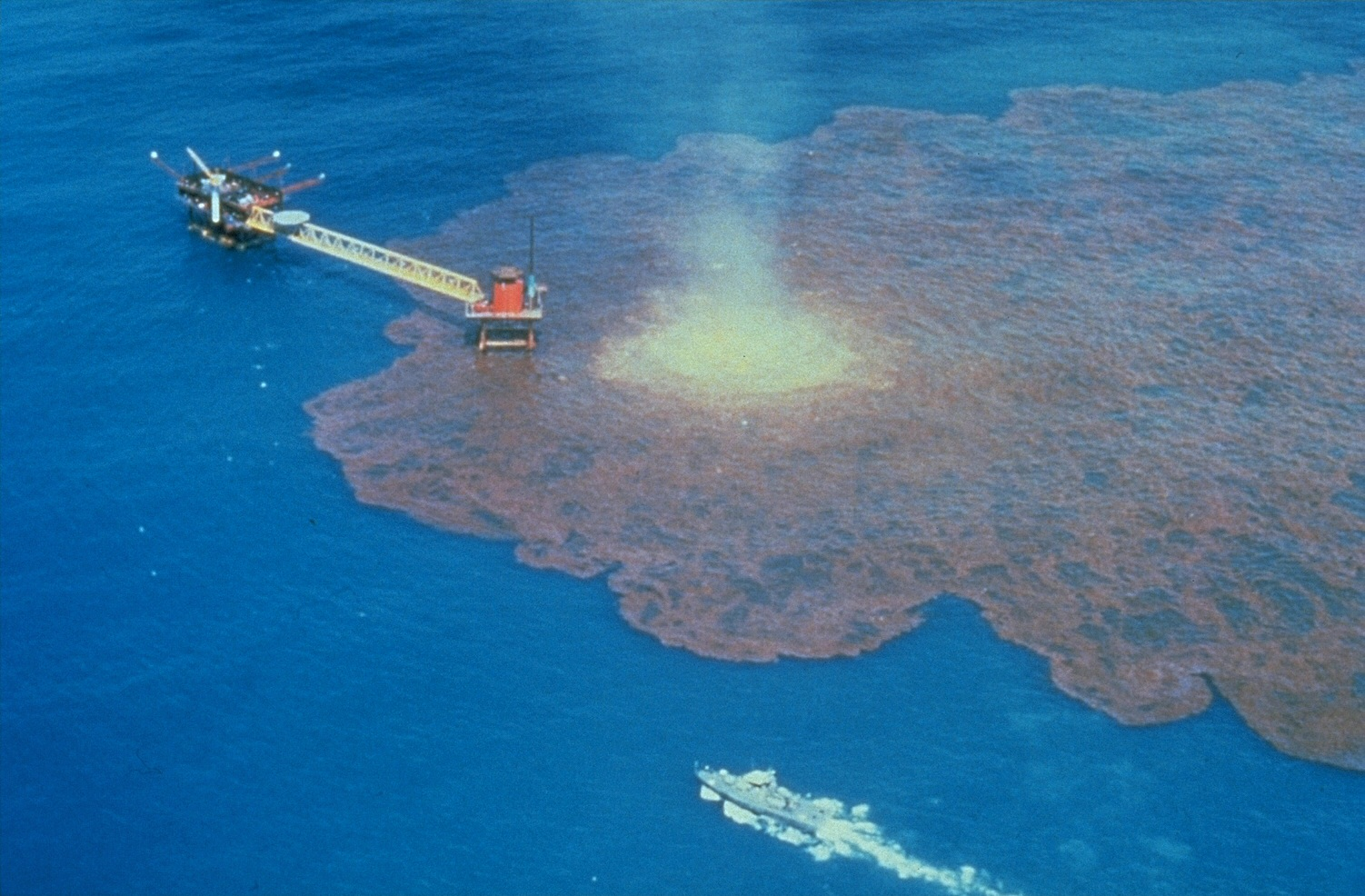
Oil spill

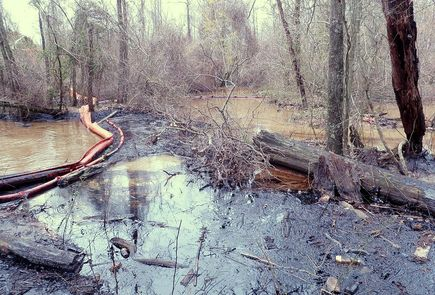
Oil spill creek

Ecotoxicity, the subject of study in the field of ecotoxicology (a portmanteau of ecology and toxicology), refers to the biological, chemical or physical stressors that affect ecosystems. Such stressors can occur in the natural environment at densities, concentrations, or levels high enough to disrupt natural biochemical and physiological behavior and interactions. This ultimately affects all living organisms that comprise an ecosystem.

Ecotoxicology has been defined as a branch of toxicology that focuses on the study of toxic effects, caused by natural or synthetic pollutants. These pollutants affect animals (including humans), vegetation, and microbes, in an intrinsic way.

== Acute vs. chronic ecotoxicity ==
In Barrie Peake's paper, Impact of Pharmaceuticals on the Environment, ecotoxicity is defined based on the level of exposure to hazardous substances. Peake identifies two categories: acute and chronic ecotoxicity (Peake, 2016).

Acute ecotoxicity refers to harmful effects that occur from exposure to a hazardous substance for up to 15 days. These effects are caused by the interaction of the chemical with an organism's cell membranes, often leading to cell or tissue damage or death (Peake, 2016).

Chronic ecotoxicity, on the other hand, refers to harmful effects from long-term exposure, ranging from 15 days to several years. It is typically linked to specific drug-receptor interactions that trigger a pharmacological response in an aquatic or terrestrial organism. While chronic ecotoxicity is less likely to be lethal, it reduces cellular biochemical functions, which can lead to changes in the organism's physiological or behavioral responses to environmental stimuli (Peake, 2016).

== Common environmental toxicants ==
1. Diethyl phthalate- enters the environment through industries manufacturing cosmetics, plastic, and other commercial products.
2. Bisphenol A (BPA)- found in mass-produced products such as medical devices, food packaging, cosmetics, children's toys, computers, CD's, etc.
3. Pharmaceuticals- a fungicide found in anti-dandruff shampoos. The most common example of this is Climbazole.
4. Pesticides
5. Some but not all: cleaning products, laundry detergents, fabric softeners, oven cleaners, and disinfectants.
6. Phosphates
7. Oil

== Household products ==
In Canada, there is no law requiring manufacturers to state the health and environmental hazards associated with their cleaning products. Many people buy such products to support a clean and healthy home, often unaware of the product's ability to harm both their own health and the surrounding environment. "Canadians spend more than $275 million on household cleaning products in a year." Chemicals from these cleaners enter our bodies through air passageways and absorption through the skin. When these cleaning products are washed down the drain, they can negatively affect aquatic ecosystems. There are also no regulations in place stating that the ingredients must be listed on labels of cleaning products. This often leads users to be unaware of the chemicals they expose themselves and their surrounding environments to.

=== Fragrance chemicals ===
Fragrance chemicals are found in most cleaning products, perfumes, and personal care products. More than 3000 chemicals are used in these fragrance mixtures. The synthetic musks used in detergents accumulate in the environment and are harmful to aquatic organisms. Certain musks are possible endocrine disruptors that interfere with hormone functioning. Phthalates are a common ingredient in these fragrance mixtures found in laundry detergents and fabric softeners. These phthalates (suspected endocrine disrupters) affect reproduction rates, including reduced sperm count in males. Certain glass cleaners and floor polishes contain dibutyl phthalate (DBP). The European Union classifies DBP as very toxic to aquatic organisms. This poses a huge danger as these cleaners, especially the floor polishes, are often rinsed down the drain and into aquatic environments.

=== Phosphates ===
Phosphates are found in many dishwasher detergents, laundry detergents, and bathroom cleaners. They act as a fertilizer in water and in high concentrations can promote algae blooms and increase weed growth. When water containing phosphates are washed into water areas, they carry with them fertilizers, nutrients, and wastes. Phytoplankton and algae flourish at the surface due to increased phosphates. Dead phytoplankton and other organisms sink to the bottom giving rise to large numbers of decomposers due to increased food supply (dead organisms, phytoplankton). Due to the increased number of decomposers that use more oxygen, fish and shrimp at the lower layers of the ocean become oxygen-starved, resulting in the creation of hypoxic zones.

=== Quaternary ammonium compounds (quats) ===
Quats are anti-microbial agents that are found in bathroom cleaners, fabric softeners, and degreasers. They are a class of irritants and sensitizers that negatively affect people who suffer from asthma. These chemicals persist in aquatic ecosystems, and are toxic to the organisms that live in them. Many researchers are concerned that their widespread use in everyday household disinfectants and cosmetics are contributing to antibiotic resistant bacteria, thus limiting microbial infection treatment options.

=== Trisodium nitrilotriacetate ===
Trisodium nitrilotriacetate is found in bathroom cleaners and possibly some laundry detergents, although they are more actively used in industrial formulations. The accumulation of trisodium nitrilotriacetate in the environment can create an overall toxic issue. In aquatic ecosystems, these chemicals cause heavy metals in sediment to redissolve into water. Many of these metals are toxic to fish and other wildlife.

=== Antimicrobial chemicals ===
Personal care products can reach the environment through drainage from waste water treatment plants and digested sludge. Recently, the antimycotic, Climbazole, was detected in wastewater treatment drainages. Climbazole is readily used in cosmetics, and is an ingredient in anti-dandruff shampoos. Shampoos contain formulations of up to 2% which is the equivalent of approximately 15g/L. Climbazole is classified as extremely toxic to aquatic organisms. It affects the growth of green algae Pseudokirchneriella subcapitata at very low concentrations.

Zebrafish experienced lethal effects after exposure to climbazole in laboratory testing. Effects included thickening of fertilized eggs, lack of somite formation, lack of detachment of the tail bud from the yolk sac, and lack of a heartbeat were all evaluated to occur after 48 hours. Danio rerio, Lemna minor, Navicula pelliculosa, Pseudokirchneriella subcapitata, and Daphnia magna were all tested and found to be negatively affected by climbazole in a concentration-dependent manner, with the highest toxicity observed in Lemna minor. Effects included stunted colony growth and darkening in color. Effects of climbazole on oats and turnip included stunted growth of the leaves and shoot, as well as turning darker in color. The aquatic ecotoxicity of climbazole can be classified as very toxic to Lemna and algae, toxic to fish, and harmful to Daphnia.

== Plasticizers ==
Phthalates and BPA have been in use since the 1920s and 1930s. Phthalates have served as additives in polyvinyl chloride (PVC) since 1926, but were also used in healthcare as insect repellents and cercaricides. BPA is now present in most aquatic environments, entering water systems through landfills and sewage treatment plant runoff, leading to its bioaccumulation in aquatic organisms. These chemicals, known as endocrine disruptors, reach aquatic environments through the manufacturing of industrial and consumer products, agriculture, food and drug processing, wastewater treatment plants, and human waste.

Phthalate esters, common additives that soften and make PVC more flexible, are found in many everyday items such as medical devices, packaging for fragrances and cosmetics, ropes, varnishes, plastic food wraps, and shower curtains. Phthalate esters have been detected in water, air, sediment, and in bodies of water worldwide (Giam et al.). Both phthalates and BPA affect reproduction in animals, including mollusks, crustaceans, amphibians, and fish, primarily by disrupting hormone systems. Some phthalates have even broader pathways of disruption, affecting development and reproduction in multiple species. Impacts include changes in offspring production and reduced hatching success. For example, in amphibians, phthalates and BPA disrupt thyroid function, affecting larval development. Mollusks, crustaceans, and amphibians are generally more sensitive to these chemicals than fish, though disrupted spermatogenesis has been observed in fish at low concentrations.

One specific phthalate, diethyl phthalate (DEP), enters aquatic environments through industries that produce cosmetics, plastics, and various commercial products, posing hazards to aquatic organisms and human health. Studies have shown that bioaccumulation of DEP occurs in the tissues of fish, such as the common carp (Cyprinus carpio), including the testis, liver, brain, gills, and muscle. After four weeks of exposure to 20 ppm of DEP, the carp became drowsy and discolored. DEP contamination also poses risks to humans through contact with cosmetics and consumption of fish. In countries that practice sewage-fed fisheries, where wastewater is used to culture fish, endocrine disruption and the presence of phthalate residues are highly likely. This risk increases when wastewater from industries containing DEP is released into these environments. In fish, DEP exposure has been linked to increased liver size, decreased testis size, and altered enzyme activities (ALT and AST). Additionally, DEP has been found to decrease the immunity of M. rosenbergii after exposure. Given that concentrations of plasticizers used in laboratory settings are similar to those found in the environment, it is likely that wildlife species are negatively affected.

== Pesticides ==
Pesticides often pose serious problems to the environment. They kill not only targeted organisms, but also non-targeted organisms in the process. Pesticides are released into the natural environment intentionally by people who are often unaware that these chemicals will travel further than anticipated, Hatakeyama et al. as cited in. Thus, pesticides largely affect the natural communities in which they are used. They negatively affect multiple levels, ranging from molecules, to tissues, to organs; to individuals, to populations, and onto communities.

In the natural environment, a combination of pesticide exposure and natural stressors such as fluctuating temperature, food shortages, or decreased oxygen availability are worse than when presented alone. Pesticides can affect the feeding rates of zoo-plankton. In the presence of pesticides, zoo-plankton display lower feeding rates which result in reduced growth and reproduction. Swimming may also be affected by pesticides, which poses a life-threatening issue for zoo-plankton as they swim to obtain food and avoid predators. Such changes may alter predator-prey relationships. A spinning behavior became apparent in Daphnia when induced by carbaryl. The presence of carbaryl increased the probability of the Daphnia being eaten by other fish, Dodson et al. as cited by. The toxicant pentachlorophenol increases swimming speed in the rotifer Brachionus calyciflorus. This in turn increased the encounter rate of predators, Preston et al. as cited by.

== Oil spills ==
One of the significant environmental impacts of oil exploration is the contamination of aquatic ecosystems through oil spills and seepages. In some areas, such as the Amazon, oil is even used to suppress dust on roadways, causing contaminated runoff to enter nearby water bodies. This creates direct human health risks, as many people, including children, walk barefoot on these oiled roads, exposing them to crude oil. Additionally, oil seepages can pollute ponds that serve as drinking water sources for local populations.

During oil exploration, the mud produced from drilling is often dumped into pits that are frequently unlined, which increases the risk of contaminants leaking into the environment. A key environmental concern involves polycyclic aromatic hydrocarbons (PAHs), which "accumulate on particles and sediments, shielding them from biodegradation," according to Green and Trett.

In one study, samples were collected from four sites (13 stations) in the Amazon where crude oil was the main pollutant. Water from Site B, a drinking pond located 100 meters from an active oil pit, had the highest concentration of total petroleum hydrocarbons (TPH). Sediment samples from the area were found to be acutely phototoxic. This region, with its limited infrastructure, relies on rivers and ponds for drinking, cooking, and bathing water. A study cited by Sebastian et al. reported higher cancer rates in a village in this region, along with widespread illness among people consuming the contaminated water.

Further research by Wernersson explored the toxicity of water and sediment samples on two aquatic species, Daphnia magna (a crustacean zooplankton) and Hyalella azteca (an amphipod). Samples were taken from four sites polluted by crude oil. In the study, immobility in D. magna was observed after 24 hours of indoor exposure. When the organisms were later exposed to sunlight, they often recovered within an hour after UV exposure. Hyalella azteca was cultured under the same conditions, with shade provided to reduce stress, and a light cycle of 16 hours light and 8 hours dark. Lethality was recorded after 96 hours of exposure.

== Overall environmental impact ==
Ecotoxicity has given us a better understanding of the extent of damage caused by the release of toxic chemicals into our environment. According to the National Library of Medicine; “Current estimates project that every year, a combined load of millions of tons of potentially toxic chemicals enters the environment from a broad range of industrial and domestic processes.” (Fantke, 2020). Some of these toxic chemicals are discharged into lakes, rivers, the ocean, and groundwater. Animals, plants, and water surfaces can also be exposed from airborne chemical emissions caused from cities, factories, and fires (Fantke, 2020). Chemical sludge often gets into agricultural and industrial soils as well.

These chemicals degrade into the environment and can become toxic metabolites. When this happens they “have the potential to bioaccumulate and biomagnify in species of higher trophic levels.” (Fantke, 2020). This can result in a wide variety of consequences, including but not limited to: the extinction of environmentally sensitive species, alterations to local food webs, physiological and genetic changes, and changes in reproduction, growth, and behavior (Fantke, 2020). Although much research into ecotoxicity has been done, there is still uncertainty about the true extent of damage caused. There may be long-term consequences on the structure and function of local and global ecosystems we are yet to understand.

== See also ==
- Ecotoxicology
- Toxicity
