= Kellicottia bostoniensis =

Scientific classification
- Kingdom: Animalia
- Phylum: Rotifera
- Class: Monogononta
- Order: Ploima
- Family: Brachionidae
- Genus: Kellicottia
- Species: K. bostoniensis

Binomial name
- Kellicottia bostoniensis (Rousselet, 1908)

Synonyms
- Notholca bostoniensis Rousselet, 1908

Species of marine rotifer

Kellicottia bostoniensis is a type of freshwater, planktonic rotifer. K. bostoniensis belongs to the family Brachionidae. K. bostoniensis is originally from North America, but invasive populations can now be found in Europe, Asia and South America as well.

== Taxonomy ==
The species K. bostoniensis was first described by Charles F. Rousselet in 1908. It was first discovered in a lake in Boston, Massachusetts. At that time it was called Notholca bostoniensis. Later in 1938 E.H. Ahlstrom reclassified Notholca bostoniensis as K. bostoniensis now belonging to the genus kellicottia.

== Description ==
K. bostoniensis possesses a lorica with long anterior and posterior spines. The body of K. bostoniensis is usually between 236 and 440 micrometers long with a positive correlation between spine length. The largest K. bostoniensis are usually found in deep clear mesotrophic water. The trophi (mastax) internal structure has been described using scanning electron microscopy.

== Distribution ==
=== Native range ===
K. bostoniensis is originally from North America. There are samples of K. bostoniensis from North America at the National Museum of Natural History and the Academy of Natural Sciences of Drexel University.

=== Introduced range ===
K. bostoniensis has spread to multiple continents through various invasive pathways.

==== Europe ====
K. bostoniensis was first found in Sweden in 1943. Then it spread to Finland, the Netherlands, France and Russia. In Russia it has been documented in over 40 bodies of water, including the Volga River Basin.

==== Asia ====
K. bostoniensis was first found in Japan then documented in South Korea.

==== South America ====
K. bostoniensis was first found in Argentina and Brazil, now it can be found throughout South America. In 2022 it was found in Colombia marking the northernmost South American occurrence.

== Ecology ==
K. bostoniensis can live in many types of freshwater such as lakes, reservoirs, rivers and wetlands. K. bostoniensis can tolerate diverse water conditions ranging from waters of 5–12 °C (41–54 °F), dissolved oxygen concentrations as low as 2.5 mg/L (0.00033 oz/US gal), and water color ranging from 30–500 ppm on the platin-cobalt scale.

In invasive ranges K. bostoniensis thrives with the most abundance in mesotropic to low eutrophic conditions. K. bostoniensis shows very little effect on the zooplankton populations, and native species seem to exhibit ineffective biotic resistance to their establishment.

=== Co-occurrence with congeners ===
In lakes and reservoirs K. bostoniensis may live with another type of rotifer called K. longispina, though K. bostoniensis usually lives in isolation in shallow waters.

== Invasion pathways ==
The species' introduction to non-native ranges is not completely understood though there are thought to be some migratory mechanics that have made an effect of the invasion of K. bostoniensis. Resting eggs may have been picked up by migrating birds, ballast waters drawn in by ships and expunged at their destination, and possible wind dispersal due to the high rates of basin-wide spread of established K. bostoniensis populations.

Most studies have been done on invasive populations leaving a research gap on the ecology of native North American populations.
