= Brachionus forficula =

Scientific classification
- Domain: Eukaryota
- Kingdom: Animalia
- Phylum: Rotifera
- Class: Monogononta
- Order: Ploima
- Family: Brachionidae
- Genus: Brachionus
- Species: B. forficula

Binomial name
- Brachionus forficula Wierzejski, 1891

Species of rotifer

Brachionus forficula is a species of freshwater rotifer in the family Brachionidae.
