= Oskar von Kirchner =

German botanist and agronomist (1851–1925)

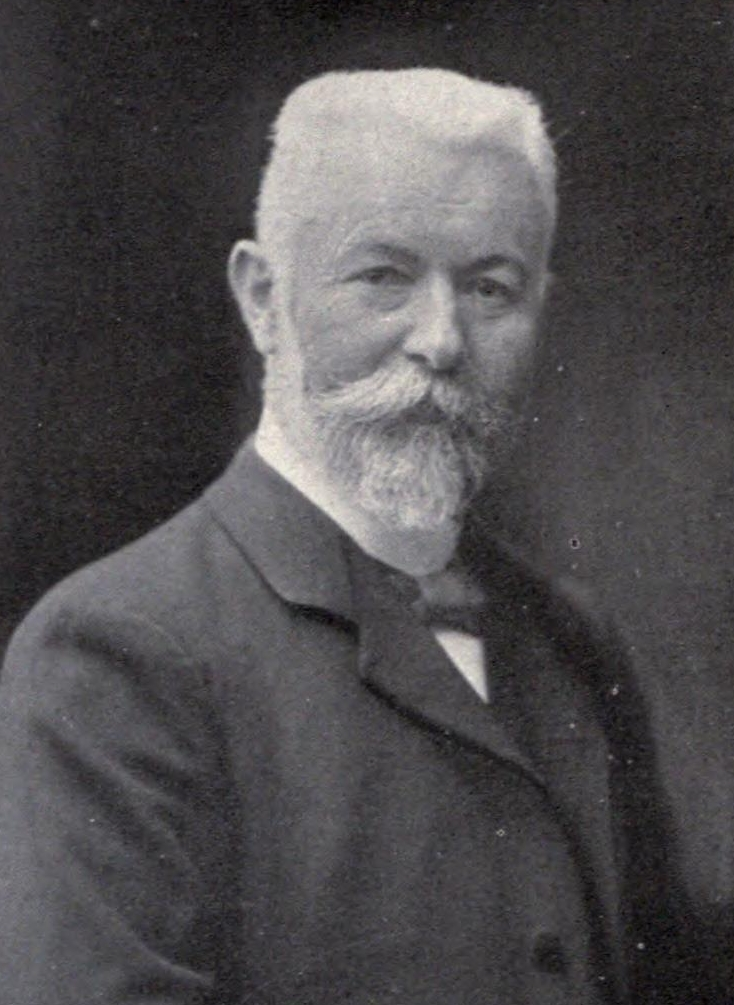
Oskar von Kirchner c. 1918

Emil Otto Oskar von Kirchner (15 September 1851, in Breslau – 25 April 1925, in Venice) was a German botanist and agronomist.

He studied botany at the University of Breslau, receiving his doctorate in 1873 with a dissertation on the botanical writings of Theophrastus. After graduation, he worked as an assistant at the pomology institute of the agricultural academy in Proskau. From 1881 to 1917 he was a professor of botany at the Agricultural Academy in Hohenheim.

The phycological genera; Kirchneria (in the family Polypodiopsida), Kirchneriella (in the family Selenastraceae), Kirchneriellopsis and Kirchneriellosaccus, all commemorate his name.

== Selected works ==
- Die mikroskopische Pflanzen-und Thierwelt des Süsswassers (with Friedrich Blochmann, 1885/86) – The microscopic freshwater plant and animal world.
- Die Krankheiten und Beschädigungen unserer landwirtschaftlichen Kulturpflanzen : eine Anleitung zu ihrer Erkennung und Bekämpfung fur Landwirte, Gärtner, 1890 – The diseases and damage to our agricultural crops, etc.
- Die Vegetation des Bodensees (with Carl Joseph Schröter, 1896) – Vegetation of Lake Constance.
- Lebensgeschichte der Blütenpflanzen Mitteleuropas : spezielle Ökologie der Blütenpflanzen Deutschlands, Österreichs und der Schweiz (with Ernst Loew; Carl Joseph Schröter; Walther Wangerin, 1904) – Life history of flowering plants in Central Europe.
- Blumen und insekten : ihre anpassungen aneinander und ihre gegenseitige abhängigkeit, 1911 – Flowers and insects: their adaptations to each other and their mutual dependence.
