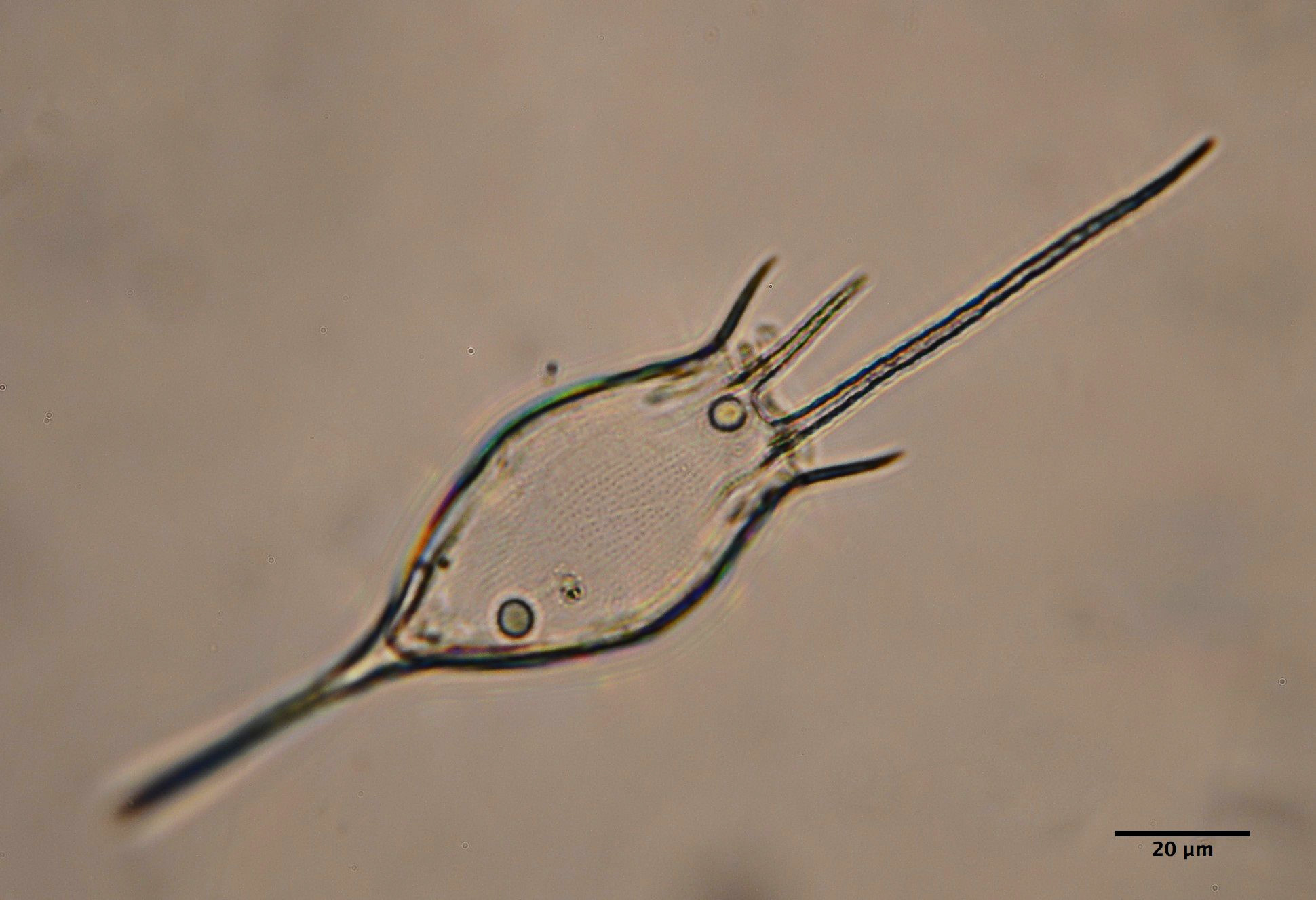
- Kellicottia bostoniensis

Scientific classification
- Domain: Eukaryota
- Kingdom: Animalia
- Phylum: Rotifera
- Class: Monogononta
- Order: Ploima
- Family: Brachionidae
- Genus: Kellicottia; Ahlstrom, 1938

= Kellicottia =

Genus of rotifers

Kellicottia is a genus of brachionid rotifer.

The genus was described in 1938 by Elbert Halvor Ahlstrom.

It has cosmopolitan distribution.

Species:

- Kellicottia bostoniensis
- Kellicottia longispina
