= Monoraphidium neglectum =

Scientific classification
- Kingdom: Plantae
- Division: Chlorophyta
- Class: Chlorophyceae
- Order: Sphaeropleales
- Family: Selenastraceae
- Genus: Monoraphidium
- Species: M. neglectum

Binomial name
- Monoraphidium neglectum Heynig & Krienitz

Species of alga

Monoraphidium neglectum is a single-cell green alga of the family Selenastraceae. Cells are free-floating (planktonic), fusiform and sometimes arched in outline, with rounded-pointed tips. They are 16–30 μm long by 3–4.5 μm wide. The chloroplast is single per cell and lacks a pyrenoid. It reproduces by forming two, four or eight autospores.

There is interest in using M. neglectum for the production of biofuels because it can accumulate large quantities (up to 33% of cell dry weight) of triacylglycerides (TAGs).

In 2013, a draft nuclear, mitochondrial, and chloroplast genome was published with an estimated nuclear size of 68 megabytes and approximately 16,761 genes. The nuclear genome is likely diploid. The mitochondrial genome of M. neglectum is 96 kilobytes, which is twice as large as Nannochloropsis gaditana and nearly six times larger than the green alga Chlamydomonas reinhardtii, but contains fewer genes.

A nuclear transformation technique has been established for M. neglectum using electrotransformation as the method of DNA delivery. The strategy described in this study, including a pretreatment step to weaken the cell wall, might inspire future studies with other microalgae also aiming at stable nuclear genetic transformation using electrotransformation.

The transcriptome of M. neglectum has been sequenced using Illumina HiSeq technology. Using a poly-A fishing and genome-guided approach, the transcriptome was assembled into 20,751 genes (i. e., loci). The dataset encompasses a time-course experiment under conditions of both, high TAG accumulation and subsequent TAG degradation. TAG accumulation and degradation were induced by nitrogen removal (-N conditions) and nitrogen resupply (NR conditions). In total, the transcriptome was sequenced at 12 time points (t0, 7x -N, 4x NR), yielding a comprehensive and high-quality dataset. The raw data (100 nt paired-end reads) has been deposited at SRA under the SRA Study accession number SRP112537. The processed data is available at http://tdbmn.cebitec.uni-bielefeld.de, at which direct gene and BLAST search enable for data mining and to investigate the expression patterns of target genes under autotrophic -N and NR conditions. It is furthermore possible to compare the expression patterns of target genes of M. neglectum with those of other microalgae which were also subjected to -N conditions to induce TAG accumulation.
