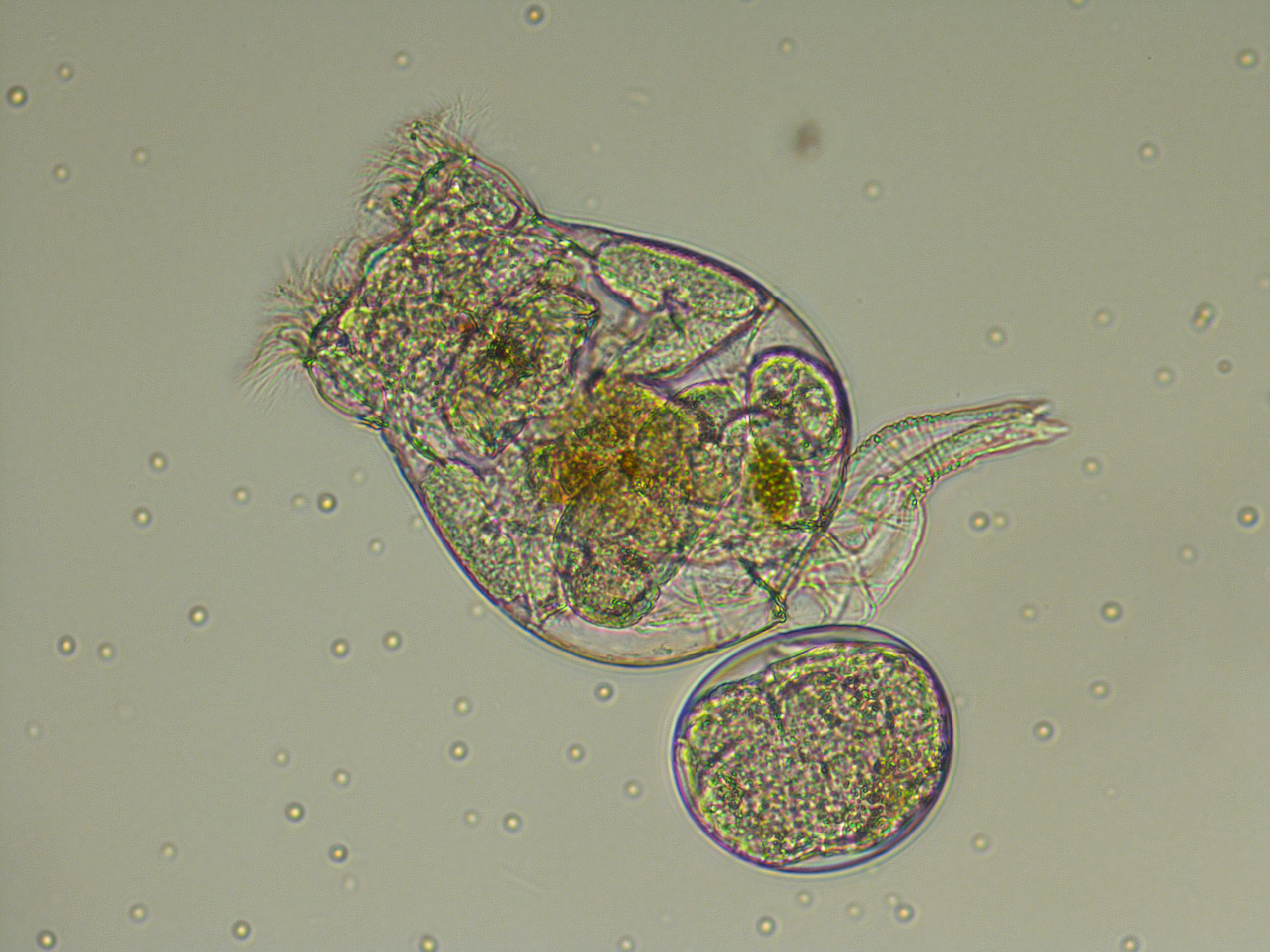

Scientific classification
- Kingdom: Animalia
- Phylum: Rotifera
- Class: Monogononta
- Order: Ploima
- Family: Brachionidae
- Genus: Brachionus
- Species: B. plicatilis

Binomial name
- Brachionus plicatilis (Müller, 1786)

= Brachionus plicatilis =

Species of rotifer

Brachionus plicatilis is a euryhaline (tolerate a wide range of salinity) rotifer in the family Brachionidae, and is possibly the only commercially important rotifer, being raised in the aquaculture industry as food for fish larvae. It has a broad distribution in salt lakes around the world and has become a model system for studies in ecology and evolution.

== Reproduction ==
Brachionus species can normally reproduce asexually and sexually (cyclical parthenogenesis). Sexual reproduction (termed Mixis) is usually induced when population density increases. Mixis in Brachionus plicatilis has been shown to be induced by a density-dependent chemical cue.

== Genome size ==
Haploid '1C' genome sizes in the Brachionus plicatilis species complex range at least from 0.056 to 0.416 pg.

The complete mitochondrial genome of B. plicatilis sensu stricto NH1L has been sequenced.

== Cryptic species complex ==
Brachionus plicatilis strains have long been divided into ‘L-’ and ‘S-type’ forms. However, studies on morphology, karyotype, genetics and reproductive behaviour revealed that these types seem to be different species (B. plicatilis and B. rotundiformis). DNA sequencing studies in 2002 revealed Brachionus plicatilis to be a cryptic species complex comprising approximately 10 separate species, each of which has been diverging for several million years. A recent study identified 22 potential different species within the Plicatilis species complex.
The species, rather than the complex, is now usually referred to as Brachionus plicatilis s. s. (sensu stricto).
The species complex can be divided into 3 major clades (clade L = larger body and genome sizes e.g. B. plicatilis s.s., clade SM = medium body and genome sizes e.g. B. 'Almenara', clade SS = small body and genome size e.g. B. rotundiformis). http://www.biomedcentral.com/1471-2148/11/90/figure/F1

List of the 22 suspected species of the B. plicatilis cryptic species complex

Species names and clade in ()

1. * B01: B. 'Tiscar', S.? (B)
2. * B02: unnamed, S. 6 (B)
3. * B03: B. 'Persia', S. ? (B)
4. * B04: B. 'Harvey', S. 14 (B)
5. * B05: B. ibericus, S. 10 (B)
6. * B06: B. Almenara (or MEG-2012), S. 9 (B)
7. * B07: B. 'Towerinniensis, S. 7 (B)
8. * B08: B. 'Coyrecupiensis', S. 8 (B)
9. * B09: B. 'Cayman' (or B. koreanus), S. 5 (B)
10. * B10: B. 'Cayman' (or B. koreanus), S. 5 (B)
11. * B11: B. 'Austria', S. 4 (A)
12. * B12: B. Nevada, S. 3 (A)
13. * B13: B. Nevada, S. 3 (A)
14. * B14: B. Nevada, S. 3 (A)
15. * B15: B. plicatilis s.s., S. 1 (A)
16. * B16: B. manjavacas, S. 2 (A)
17. * B17: unnamed, S. 12 (C)
18. * B18: unnamed, S. 12 (C)
19. * B19: unnamed, S. 12 (C)
20. * B20: B. rotundiformis, S. 11 (C)
21. * B21: unnamed, S. ? (C)
22. * B22: B. 'Lost', S. 13 (C)
