= Keratella cochlearis =

- Kellicottia longispina and Keratella cochlearis

Scientific classification
- Kingdom: Animalia
- Phylum: Rotifera
- Class: Monogononta
- Order: Ploima
- Family: Brachionidae
- Genus: Keratella
- Species: K. cochlearis

Binomial name
- Keratella cochlearis (Gosse, 1851)

Species of rotifer

Keratella cochlearis is a rotifer. The planktonic animal occurs worldwide in freshwater and marine habitats.

== Description ==
Keratella cochlearis has an oval lorica, a shell-like protective outer cuticle. At the anterior end are three pairs of spines. The central pair curve towards the ventral surface, the next pair diverge slightly and the outer pair converge. There is a single red eye There is also a central funnel-shaped mouth and on either side of this are rings of cilia which twirl and help waft food particles into the mouth. They are also used for locomotion. There are two forms of this rotifer; some individuals have a long spine at the posterior end and others do not. Neither form has a foot.

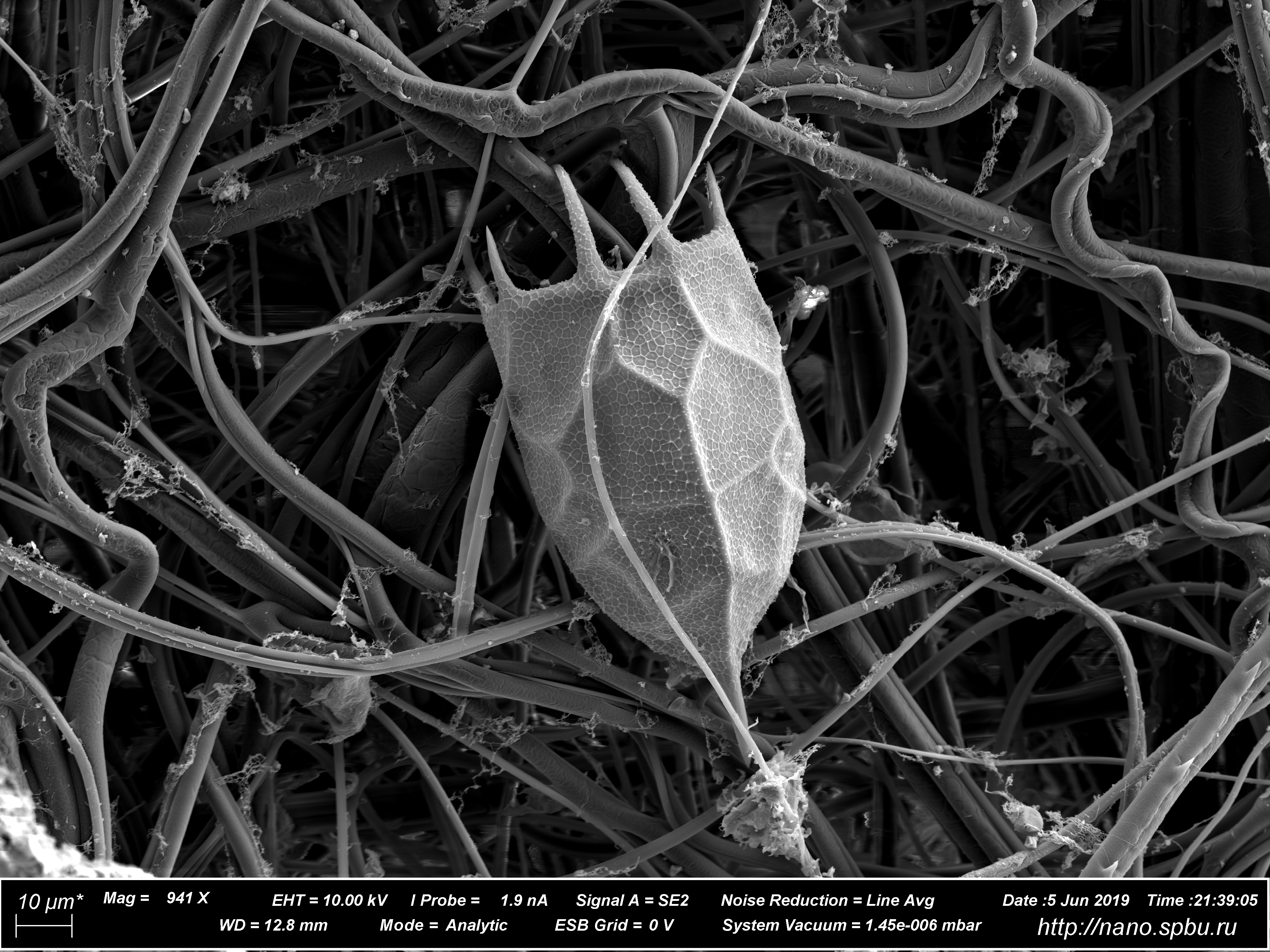
Lorica of the Rotifer Keratella cochlearis, Scanning electron microscope photo.

== Distribution ==
Keratella cochlearis is found worldwide in marine, brackish and freshwater habitats. Any body of standing water is likely to contain rotifers and Keratella cochlearis is probably the most common and widespread species in the world.

== Life cycle ==
Keratella cochlearis is dioecious, with female specimens being larger than males. Typically, reproduction in this species is by parthenogenesis. In this process, the female rotifer produces an unfertilised egg with a full set of chromosomes. This is carried around by the mother and hatches into a miniature adult. Whether the offspring has a posterior spine or not seems to depend on the number of predators in the body of water where the rotifer lives. If predation rates are high, spined "typica" forms are produced, but if low, spineless forms known as "tecta" develop. Tecta females can produce typica offspring and vice versa. It has also been found that different forms tend to predominate at different times of year. In the winter, most individuals have a long spine at the posterior end. As the spring advanced, the spine shortens and by July it is very short or non-existent. During the remaining months of the year it gradually lengthens once more. These changes take place over several generations as each individual rotifer has a lifespan of just a few days or weeks.

Periodically sexual reproduction takes place. It is not known why this occurs at some times and not others. The female undergoes meiosis and produces eggs with half the usual number of chromosomes. Some of these develop into male rotifers. Each of these is able to inseminate another of these eggs to restore the full complement of chromosomes in the offspring.
