= Brachionus nilsoni =

Scientific classification
- Kingdom: Animalia
- Phylum: Rotifera
- Class: Monogononta
- Order: Ploima
- Family: Brachionidae
- Genus: Brachionus
- Species: B. nilsoni

Binomial name
- Brachionus nilsoni Ahlstrom, 1940

Species of rotifer

Brachionus nilsoni is a euryhaline (tolerates a wide range of salinity) rotifer in the family Brachionidae. The species is distinguishable from all brachionids by lacking posterior spines, by the shape of the foot apertures and the posterior portion of its lorica, and the long thin occipital spines.

== Etymology ==
It is named after Börje Carlin-Nilsson.

== Description ==
Its lorica is firm, oval, divided into a dorsal and a ventral plate. The anterior dorsal margin has six thin, acutely pointed spines. It is sometimes lightly stippled and may have wavy lines in some cases.

Its mental edge is firm and elevated, with a small median notch. Its foot aperture is small and sub-square dorsally, while being large and U-shaped ventrally. Lorica (may at times be marked with short wavy lines).

== Distribution ==
Found in small numbers in Mud and Ottawa Creeks in northwest Ohio.
