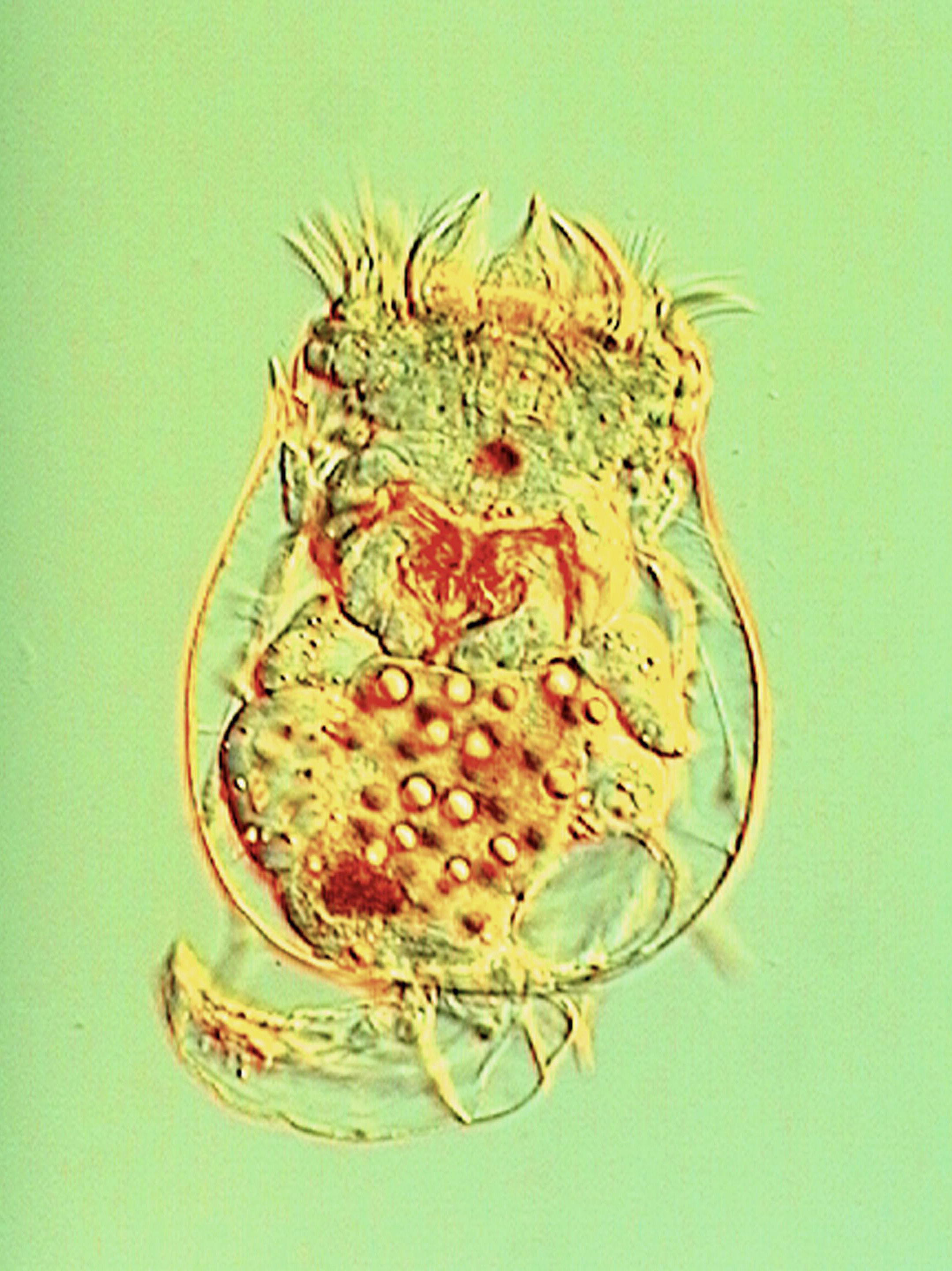
- Brachionus calyciflorus

Scientific classification
- Kingdom: Animalia
- Phylum: Rotifera
- Class: Monogononta
- Order: Ploima
- Family: Brachionidae
- Genus: Brachionus; Pallas, 1766

Type species
- Brachionus calyciflorus Pallas, 1766

Synonyms
- List: Arthracanthus Schmarda, 1854; Arthrocanthus Schmarda, 1859; Dadayus Gallagher, 1957; Noteus Ehrenberg, 1830; Schizocerca Daday, 1883; Tricalama Bory de St. Vincent, 1826

= Brachionus =

Genus of rotifers

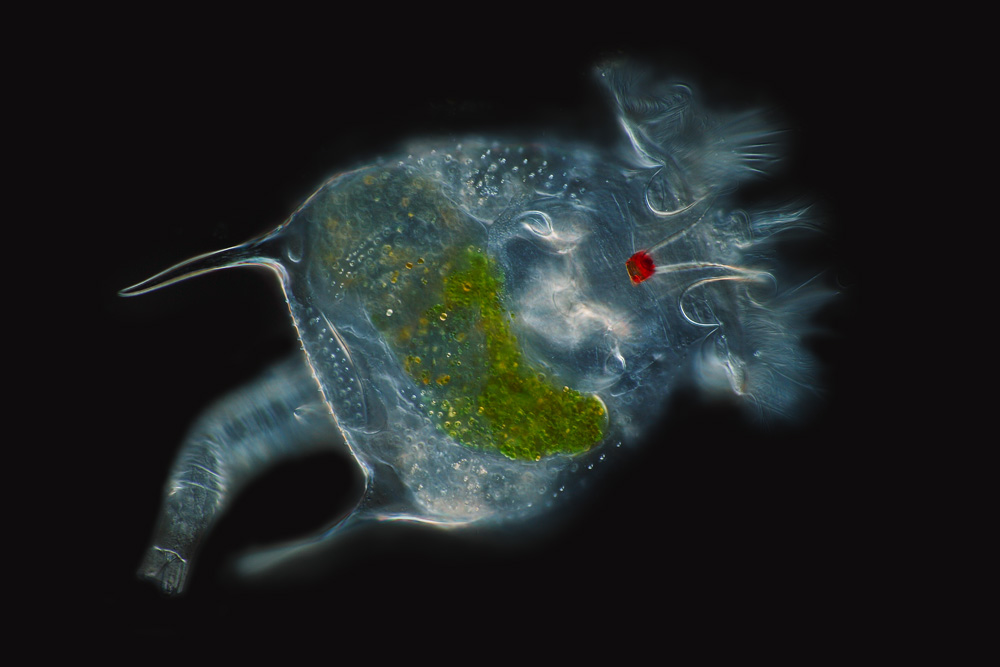
Brachionus quadridentatus

Brachionus is a genus of planktonic rotifers occurring in freshwater, alkaline and brackish water.

== Species ==
The following species are recognised in the genus Brachionus:

- Brachionus adisi Koste & Hardy, 1984
- Brachionus africanus Segers, Mbogo & Dumont, 1994
- Brachionus ahlstromi Lindeman, 1939
- Brachionus amazonicus Koste & Robertson, 1983
- Brachionus amsterdamensis De Smet, 2001
- Brachionus angularis Gosse, 1851
- Brachionus araceliae Silva-Briano, Galvan-De la Rosa, Perez-Legaspi & Rico-Martinez, 2007
- Brachionus asplanchnoidis Charin, 1947
- Brachionus austrogenitus Ahlstrom, 1940
- Brachionus baylyi Sudzuki & Timms, 1977
- Brachionus bennini Leissling, 1924
- Brachionus bidentatus Anderson, 1889
- Brachionus budapestinensis Daday, 1885
- Brachionus calyciflorus Pallas, 1766
- Brachionus caudatus Barrois & Daday, 1894
- Brachionus charini Kutikova, Kosova & Khodorevsky, 1976
- Brachionus chelonis Ahlstrom, 1940
- Brachionus dichotomus Shephard, 1911
- Brachionus dimidiatus Bryce, 1931
- Brachionus diversicornis (Daday, 1883)
- Brachionus dolabratus Harring, 1914
- Brachionus donneri Brehm, 1951
- Brachionus dorcas Gosse, 1851
- Brachionus durgae Dhanapathi, 1974
- Brachionus elevatus Michaloudi, Papakostas, Stamou & al., 2018
- Brachionus falcatus Zacharias, 1898
- Brachionus fernandoi Michaloudi, Papakostas, Stamou & al., 2018
- Brachionus forficula Wierzejski, 1891
- Brachionus gessneri Hauer, 1956
- Brachionus gillardi Hauer, 1966
- Brachionus havanaensis Rousselet, 1911
- Brachionus huangi Zhuge & Koste, 1996
- Brachionus ibericus Ciros-Pérez, Gómez & Serra, 2001
- Brachionus incertus Hauer, 1953
- Brachionus josefinae Silva-Briano & Segers, 1992
- Brachionus keikoa Koste, 1979
- Brachionus koreanus Hwang, Dahms, Park & Lee, 2013
- Brachionus kostei Shiel, 1983
- Brachionus kultrum Paggi, 1981
- Brachionus leydigii Cohn, 1862
- Brachionus lyratus Shephard, 1911
- Brachionus macrocanthus Jakubski, 1912
- Brachionus manjavacas Fontaneto, Giordani, Melone & Serra, 2007
- Brachionus mirabilis Daday, 1897
- Brachionus mirus Daday, 1905
- Brachionus murphyi Sudzuki, 1989
- Brachionus nilsoni Ahlstrom, 1940
- Brachionus novaezealandiae Morris, 1913
- Brachionus paranguensis Guerrero-Jimenez et al., 2019
- Brachionus pinneenaus Koste & Shiel, 1983
- Brachionus plicatilis Müller, 1786
- Brachionus postcurvatus Kuczynski, 1991
- Brachionus pseudodolabratus Ahlstrom, 1940
- Brachionus pseudonilsoni Sudzuki, 1992
- Brachionus pterodinoides Rousselet, 1913
- Brachionus quadridentatus Hermann, 1783
- Brachionus rotundiformis Tschugunoff, 1921
- Brachionus rubens Ehrenberg, 1838
- Brachionus satanicus Rousselet, 1911
- Brachionus schwoerbeli Koste, 1988
- Brachionus sericus Rousselet, 1907
- Brachionus sessilis Varga, 1951
- Brachionus spatiosus Rousselet, 1912
- Brachionus srisumonae Segers, Kotethip & Sanoamuang, 2004
- Brachionus urceolaris Müller, 1773
- Brachionus variabilis Hempel, 1896
- Brachionus zahniseri Ahlstrom, 1934

== Use ==
Rotifers such as Brachionus calyciflorus are favored test animals in aquatic toxicology because of their sensitivity to most toxicants. They also are used as model organisms in various other biological fields e.g. due to their interesting reproductive mode in evolutionary ecology. Brachionus spp. are easily reared in large numbers and because of this are used to substitute for wild zooplankton for feeding hatchery reared larval fish. However, the composition of rotifers generally does not satisfy the nutritional requirements of fish larvae, and large amounts of research have been invested in improving the lipid, vitamin and mineral composition of rotifers to better meet the requirements of fish larvae

== Reproduction ==
Brachionus species can normally reproduce sexually and asexually (cyclical parthenogenesis). Sexual reproduction (termed Mixis) is usually induced when population density increases. Mixis in Brachionus plicatilis has been shown to be induced by a density-dependent chemical cue.

Transitions to obligate parthenogenesis have been described in Brachionus calyciflorus. In this species, obligate parthenogenesis can be inherited by a recessive allele, which leads to loss of sexual reproduction in homozygous offspring. In Brachionus manjavacas rotifers, offspring's survival and its cell's ability to growth and division decrease with advancing age of mother.

== Genome size ==
Haploid '1C' genome sizes in Brachionus species range at least from 0.056 to 0.416 pg.

== Genome sequencing ==
The complete mitochondrial genome of B. plicatilis sensu stricto NH1L has been sequenced.

== Cryptic species ==
Brachionus plicatilis has been demonstrated to be a large cryptic species complex consisting of several different species. It has a worldwide diversity of at least 14 - 22 cryptic taxa.

Brachionus calyciflorus also seems to be a cryptic species complex.
