= Friedrich Blochmann =

German zoologist

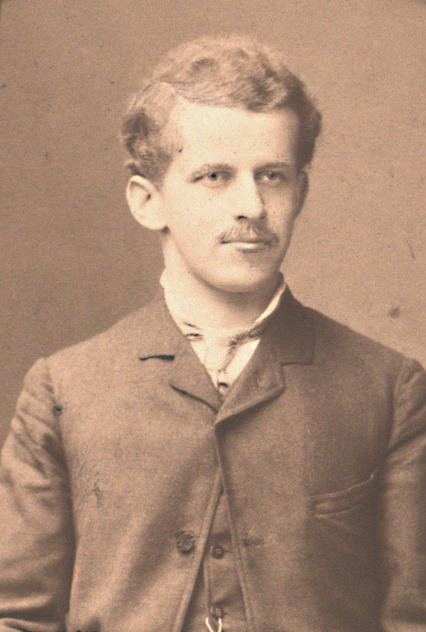
Friedrich Blochmann, unknown date, from the archives of the Heidelberg University Library

Friedrich Johann Wilhelm Blochmann (21 January 1858 in Karlsruhe – 22 September 1931 in Tübingen) was a German zoologist. He was a son-in-law to historian Eduard Winkelmann (1838–1896).

He studied at the technical school in Karlsruhe and at the University of Heidelberg, where he was a student of Otto Bütschli. In 1885 he obtained his habilitation and in 1888 became an associate professor. In 1891 he succeeded Maximilian Braun as professor of zoology and comparative anatomy at the University of Rostock. In 1898 he relocated as a professor to the University of Tübingen.

In the field of phycology, he described the algae species Haematococcus buetschlii.

A species of lizard, Leptosiaphos blochmanni, is named in his honor.

== Selected works ==
- Die mikroskopische Pflanzen- und Thierwelt des Süsswassers (with Oskar von Kirchner, 1885/86) – The microscopic freshwater plant and animal world. Volume 2: Thierwelt - animal world - is by Blochmann
- Über eine neue Haematococcusart, 1886 – On a new type of Haematococcus.
- Untersuchungen über den Bau der Brachiopoden, 1892 – Investigations on the construction of brachiopods.
- Die epithelfrage bei Cestoden und Trematoden, 1896 – The epithelium of cestodes and trematodes.
- Die Brachiopoden der Schwedischen Südpolar-expedition, 1912 – Brachiopods of the Swedish South Polar Expedition.
