= Chlorolobion =

Scientific classification
- Clade: Viridiplantae
- Division: Chlorophyta
- Class: Chlorophyceae
- Order: Sphaeropleales
- Family: Selenastraceae
- Genus: Chlorolobion; Korshikov, 1953

Type species
- Chlorolobion obtusum Korshikov

Species
- See text

Genus of algae

Chlorolobion, sometimes spelled Chlorolobium, is a genus of algae belonging to the family Selenastraceae. The species of this genus are found in freshwater habitats in Europe and America.

Chlorolobion consists of single cells. They are either free-floating, or in the case of Chlorolobion obtusum, attached to the carapaces of freshwater crustaceans. Cells are asymmetrically fusiform (spindle-shaped) with one side being more curved than the other. The tips of the cells are rounded. The single chloroplast is plate-like and wraps around the inside of the cell, and contains one (rarely two) pyrenoids. Unlike other genera in its family, Chlorolobion has pyrenoids that are surrounded by a starch sheath, making them visible in the light microscope.

Species:

- Chlorolobion braunii (Nägeli) Komárek, 1979
- Chlorolobion obtusum Korshikov
- Chlorolobion lunulatum Hindák
- Chlorolobion tianjinensis Wang & Feng
