= Leptosiaphos blochmanni =

Conservation status
- Data Deficient (IUCN 3.1)

Scientific classification
- Kingdom: Animalia
- Phylum: Chordata
- Class: Reptilia
- Order: Squamata
- Family: Scincidae
- Genus: Leptosiaphos
- Species: L. blochmanni

Binomial name
- Leptosiaphos blochmanni (Tornier, 1903)

Synonyms
- Lygosoma blochmanni Tornier, 1903; Lygosoma (Leptosiaphos) blochmanni — Schmidt, 1943; Panaspis blochmanni — Greer, 1974; Leptosiaphos blochmanni — Broadley, 1998

Species of lizard

Leptosiaphos blochmanni, also known commonly as the Zaire three-toed skink, is a species of lizard in the family Scincidae. The species is native to Central Africa.

== Etymology ==
The specific name, blochmanni, is in honor of German zoologist Friedrich Johann Wilhelm Blochmann.

== Geographic range ==
L. blochmanni is found in southwestern Rwanda. It may also occur in eastern Democratic Republic of the Congo and northern Burundi.

== Description ==
The holotype of L. blochmanni has a snout-to-vent length (SVL) of 4.8 cm (1.9 in), and a tail length of 9.5 cm (3.7 in). There are three digits on each of the four feet.

== Behavior ==
L. blochmanni is terrestrial and semifossorial.

== Diet ==
L. blochmanni probably preys upon insects.

== Reproduction ==
L. blochmanni is oviparous.
