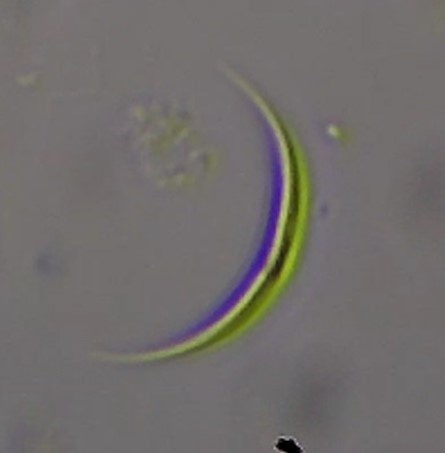
- Monoraphidium arcuatum

Scientific classification
- Kingdom: Plantae
- Division: Chlorophyta
- Class: Chlorophyceae
- Order: Sphaeropleales
- Family: Selenastraceae
- Genus: Monoraphidium; Komárková-Legnerová

Type species
- Monoraphidium neglectum (Berkeley) Komárková-Legnerová

Species
- M. braunii; M. minutum; M. dybowskii; M. terrestre; M. neglectum; M. circinale; M. contortum; M. pusillum; M. convolutum; M. griffithii; M. sp. Itas 9/21 14-6w; M. saxatile; M. sp. Itas 8/18 S-1d; M. sp. Itas 9/21 14-1w; M. sp. GK12; M. sp. Dek19

= Monoraphidium =

Genus of algae

Monoraphidium is a genus of green algae in the family Selenastraceae. Monoraphidium is found free-floating or attached to surfaces in water, or in soils. It is one of the most common types of phytoplankton in freshwater habitats, and has a cosmopolitan distribution.

Monoraphidium consists of single cells, which are 2-182 by 1-8 micrometers. The cell is straight to lunate to sigmoid or helically shaped. Cells contain a single nucleus, a single parietal chloroplast and a single pyrenoid lacking a starch sheath (or no pyrenoid at all). Reproduction occurs asexually by autospores.

It is similar to and often confused with the related genus Ankistrodesmus, from which it differs by being typically unicellular.

Some species and strains of Monoraphidium, such as Monoraphidium neglectum, are promising candidates for commercial biofuel production.
