= Raphidocelis =

Scientific classification
- Kingdom: Plantae
- Division: Chlorophyta
- Class: Chlorophyceae
- Order: Sphaeropleales
- Family: Selenastraceae
- Genus: Raphidocelis; Hindák

Type species
- Raphidocelis sigmoidea Hindák

Species
- Raphidocelis arcuata; Raphidocelis danubiana; Raphidocelis extensa; Raphidocelis inclinata; Raphidocelis mayorii; Raphidocelis microscopica; Raphidocelis mucosa; Raphidocelis pseudomucosa; Raphidocelis roselata; Raphidocelis rotunda; Raphidocelis sigmoidea; Raphidocelis subcapitata; Raphidocelis turfosa; Raphidocelis valida; Raphidocelis van-goorii

Genus of algae

Raphidocelis is a genus of green algae in the family Selenastraceae. They are found in freshwater habitats.

One species, Raphidocelis subcapitata, is a common model organism in the field of toxicology, where it is used as a bioassay. It was previously known as Selenastrum capricornutum, a name later shown to be incorrect.

== Description ==
Raphidocelis consists of solitary cells or of colonies of cells within a thin layer of mucilage. Cells are crescent-shaped, with pointed ends that may be twisted out of the plane of the cell. Each cell contains a single parietal chloroplast filling the cell. Raphidocelis is sometimes reported as lacking a pyrenoid; it does indeed contain one, although it is not covered in layer of starch grains making it often difficult to observe under the light microscope.

Raphidocelis reproduces asexually by autospores; zoospores and sexual reproduction have not been observed in this genus.
