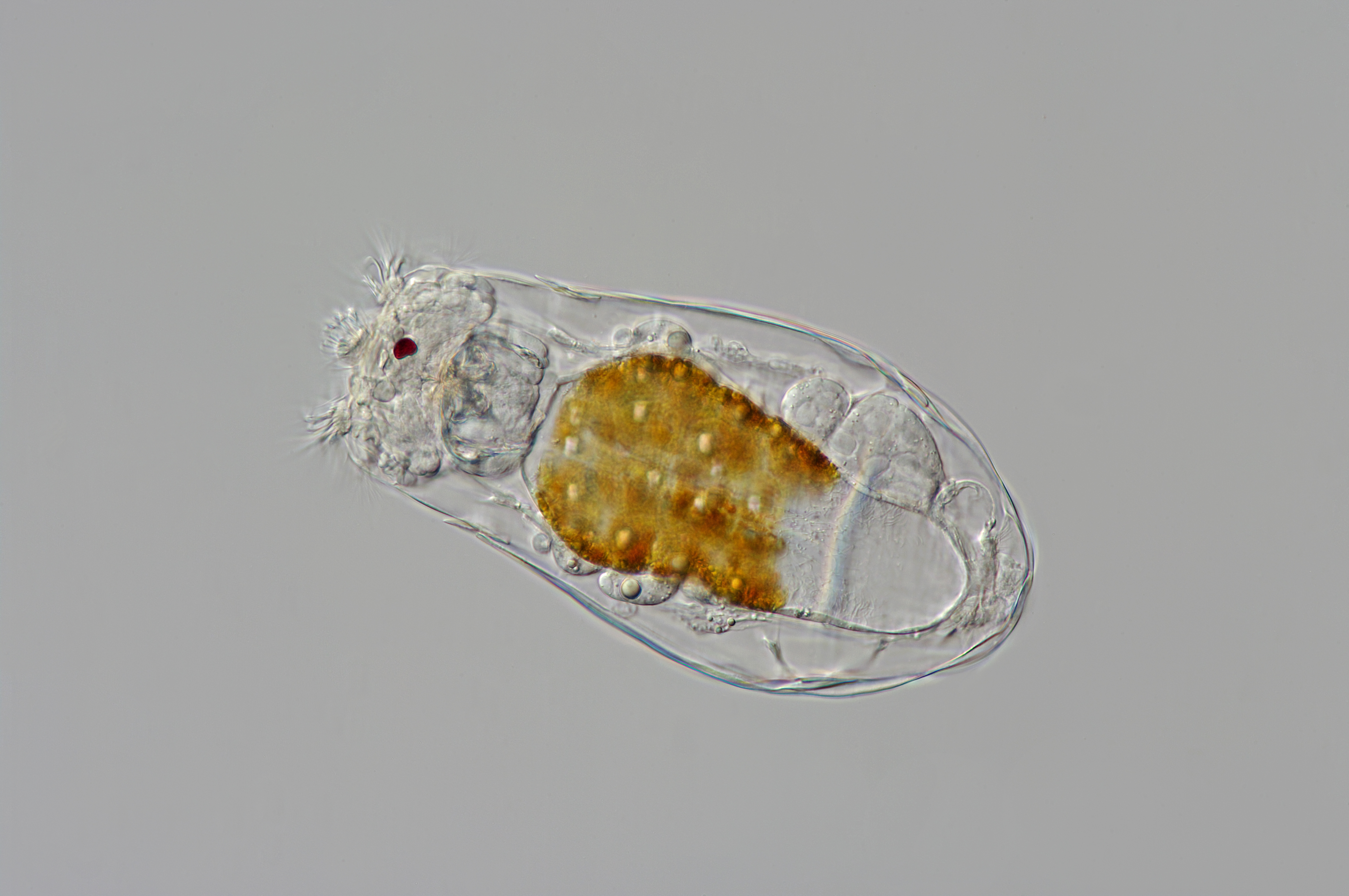

Scientific classification
- Kingdom: Animalia
- Phylum: Rotifera
- Class: Monogononta
- Order: Ploima
- Family: Brachionidae
- Genus: Notholca; Gosse, 1886

Species
- See text

= Notholca =

Notholca Temporal range: Holocene–Recent

Genus of rotifers

Notholca is a genus of rotifers known from Holocene lake deposits as well as the present day.

== Species ==
- Notholca acuminata (Ehrenberg, 1832)
- Notholca bipalium (Müller, 1786)
- Notholca caudata Carlin, 1943
- Notholca foliacea (Ehrenberg, 1838)
- Notholca hollowdayi Dartnall, 1995
- Notholca ikaitophila Sørensen & Kristensen, 2000
- Notholca japonica (Marukawa, 1928)
- Notholca labis Gosse, 1887
- Notholca marina Focke, 1961
- Notholca psammarina Buchholz & Ruhmann, 1956
- †Notholca salina Focke, 1961
- Notholca squamula (Müller, 1786)
- Notholca striata (Müller, 1786)
- Notholca verae Kutikova, 1958
- Notholca walterkostei José de Paggi, 1982

Notholca longispina is a synonym of Kellicottia longispina (Kellicott, 1879).
