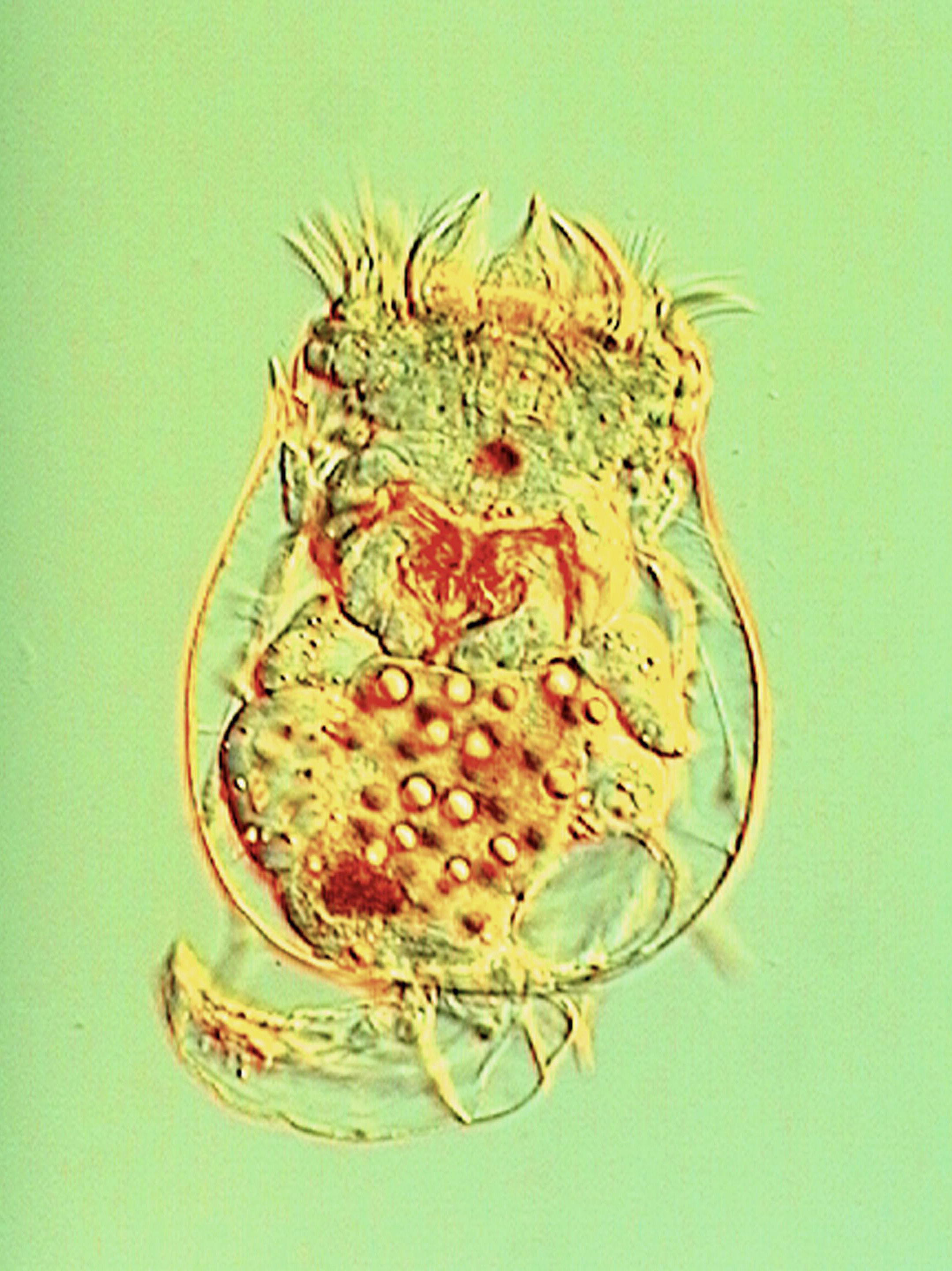

Scientific classification
- Kingdom: Animalia
- Phylum: Rotifera
- Class: Monogononta
- Order: Ploima
- Family: Brachionidae
- Genus: Brachionus
- Species: B. calyciflorus

Binomial name
- Brachionus calyciflorus Pallas, 1766

Synonyms
- List: Anuraea divaricata Weisse, 1845; Anuraea palea Ehrenberg, 1830; Arthracanthus biremis Schmarda, 1854; Arthracanthus quadriremis Schmarda, 1854; Brachionus decipiens Plate, 1886; Brachionus dorcas f. spinosus Wierzejski, 1891; Brachionus dorcas var. spinosus Wierzejski, 1891; Brachionus margoi Daday, 1883; Brachionus pala Ehrenberg, 1838; Brachionus palea Ehrenberg, 1830; Brachionus pentacanthus France, 1894

= Brachionus calyciflorus =

Species of rotifers

Brachionus calyciflorus is a planktonic species of rotifer occurring in freshwater. It is commonly used as a model organism in toxicology, ecology and evolutionary biology. Its advantages include the small size and short generation time (average generation time of B. calyciflorus is around 2.2 days at 24 °C).

== Taxonomy ==
Brachionus calyciflorus is the type species of its genus and may be a species complex consisting of more than one species.

== Reproduction ==
Brachionus calyciflorus normally reproduces by cyclical parthenogenesis.
Transitions to obligate parthenogenesis have been described. Obligate parthenogens were homozygous for a recessive allele, which caused inability to respond to the chemical signals that normally induce sexual reproduction in this species.
