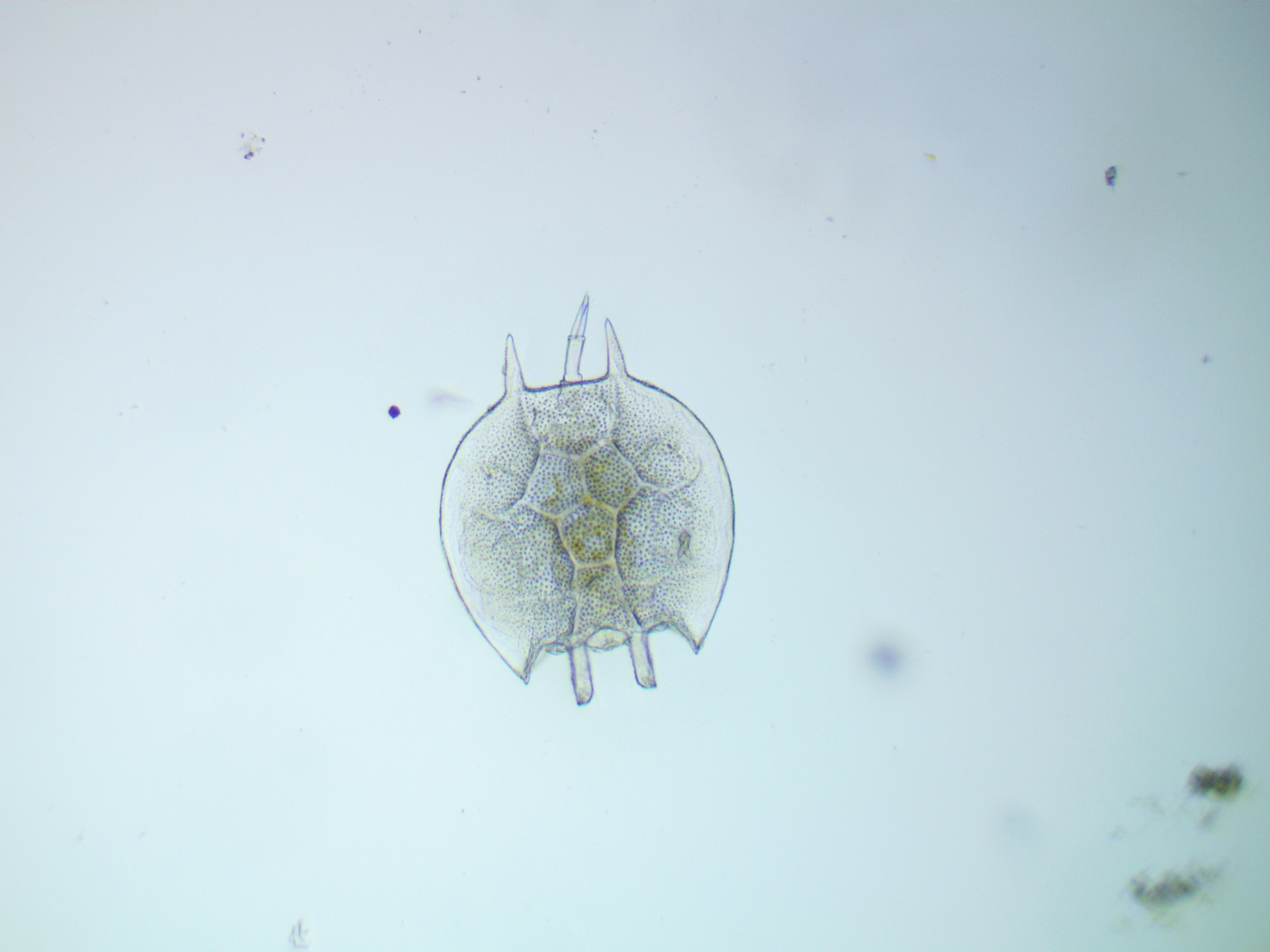
- Platyias quadricornis

Scientific classification
- Domain: Eukaryota
- Kingdom: Animalia
- Phylum: Rotifera
- Class: Monogononta
- Order: Ploima
- Family: Brachionidae
- Genus: Platyias; Harring, 1913

= Platyias =

Genus of rotifers

Platyias is a genus of rotifers belonging to the family Brachionidae.

The genus has almost cosmopolitan distribution.

Species:

- Platyias latiscapularis Koste, 1974
- Platyias leloupi Gillard, 1957
- Platyias quadricornis (Ehrenberg, 1832)
