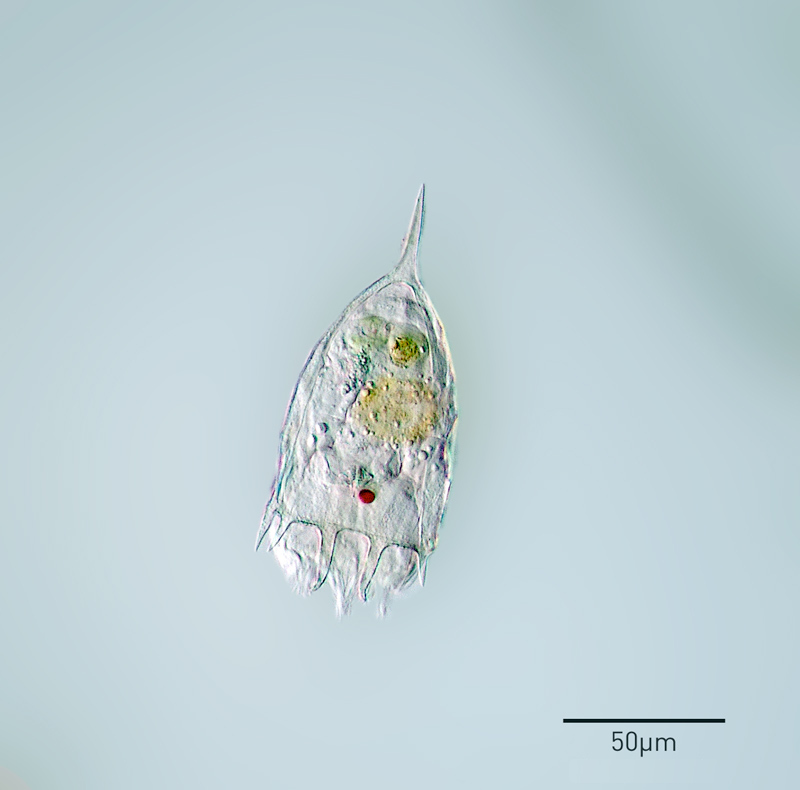
- Keratella cochlearis

Scientific classification
- Domain: Eukaryota
- Kingdom: Animalia
- Phylum: Rotifera
- Class: Monogononta
- Order: Ploima
- Family: Brachionidae
- Genus: Keratella; Bory de Saint-Vincent, 1822

= Keratella =

Genus of rotifers

Keratella is a genus of Brachionidae.

The genus was described in 1822 by Jean Baptiste Bory de Saint-Vincent.

It has cosmopolitan distribution.

Species:

- Keratella cochlearis
- Keratella hiemalis
- Keratella quadrata
