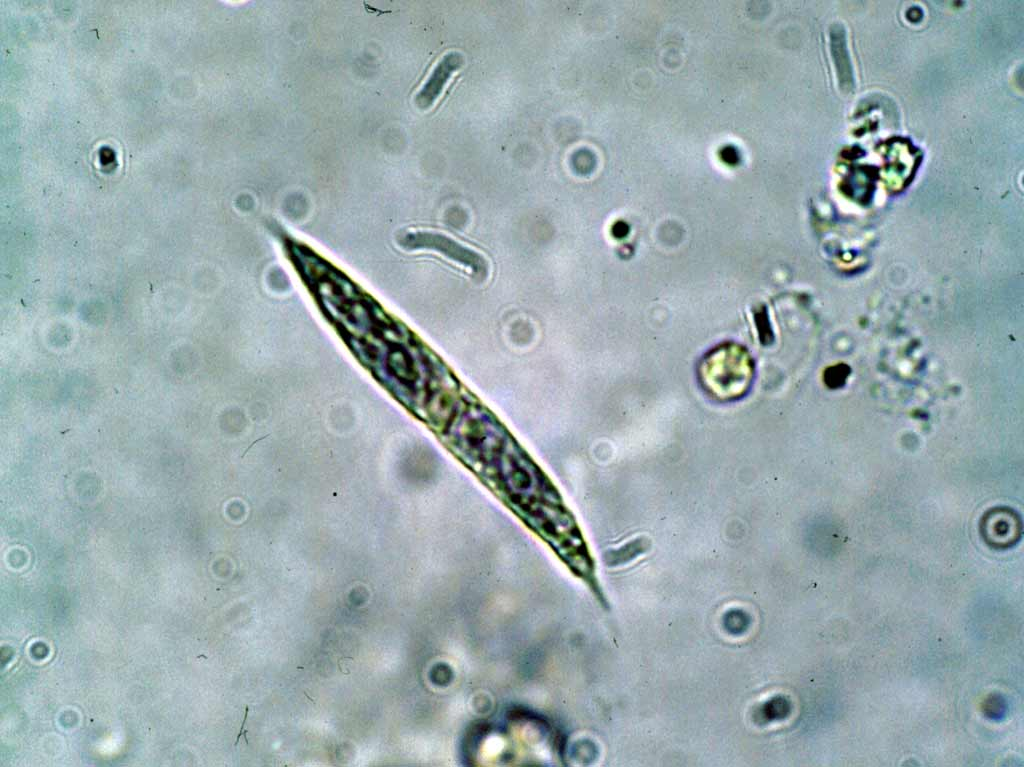

Scientific classification
- Kingdom: Plantae
- Division: Chlorophyta
- Class: Chlorophyceae
- Order: Sphaeropleales
- Family: Selenastraceae
- Genus: Quadrigula; Printz

Type species
- Quadrigula closterioides (Bohlin) Printz

Species
- Quadrigula chodatii; Quadrigula closterioides

= Quadrigula =

Genus of algae

Quadrigula is a genus of green algae in the family Selenastraceae. It is commonly found in freshwater habitats as phytoplankton.

== Description ==
Quadrigula forms colonies of two, four, or cells within a common mucilaginous envelope. Cells are cigar-shaped, 7 to 45 μm long and 1 to 8 μm wide. The cells are bundled such that the long axes of cells are parallel to each other. The tips of the cells are rounded or acutely pointed. Cells contain a single nucleus and one parietal chloroplast; the chloroplast may or may not contain a pyrenoid.

Species identification relies on details of the cell size and shape.
