= Anuraeopsis =

Scientific classification
- Kingdom: Animalia
- Phylum: Rotifera
- Class: Monogononta
- Order: Ploima
- Family: Brachionidae
- Genus: Anuraeopsis; Lauterborn, 1900

Synonyms
- Paranuraeopsis Koste, 1974

Genus of rotifers

Anuraeopsis is a genus of rotifers belonging to the family Brachionidae.

The species of this genus are found in Europe and America.

== Species ==
The following species are recognised in the genus Anuraeopsis:

- Anuraeopsis coelata de Beauchamp, 1932
- Anuraeopsis cristata Berzinš, 1956
- Anuraeopsis fissa Gosse, 1851
- Anuraeopsis lata Berzinš, 1962
- Anuraeopsis miracleae Koste, 1991
- Anuraeopsis navicula Rousselet, 1911
- Anuraeopsis quadriantennata (Koste, 1974)
- Anuraeopsis siolii Koste, 1972
- Anuraeopsis urawensis Sudzuki, 1957
- Anuraeopsis wulferti Sudzuki, 1998
- BOLD:ADX0390 (Anuraeopsis sp.)
