= Raphidocelis subcapitata =

Scientific classification
- Clade: Viridiplantae
- Division: Chlorophyta
- Class: Chlorophyceae
- Order: Sphaeropleales
- Family: Selenastraceae
- Genus: Raphidocelis
- Species: R. subcapitata

Binomial name
- Raphidocelis subcapitata (Korshikov) Nygaard, Komárek, J.Kristiansen & O.M.Skulberg

Synonyms
- Kirchneriella subcapitata Korshikov; Pseudokirchneriella subcapitata (Korshikov) Hindák

Species of alga

Raphidocelis subcapitata, formerly known as Selenastrum capricornutum and Pseudokirchneriella subcapitata is a microalga. This microalga presents a curved and twisted appearance like a sickle. The cells are normally presented in a solitary form in culture, although it may also be present in small colonies. It has a length between 7 and 15 μm, and a width between 1.2 and 3 μm. A single chloroplast is present, filling nearly the entire cell; it lacks a pyrenoid. It is commonly used as a bioindicator species to assess the levels of nutrients or toxic substances in fresh water environments. This species is quite sensitive to the presence of toxic substances including metals and has a ubiquitous distribution, so is broadly used in ecotoxicology. This species has been found to be more competitive than Chlorella vulgaris at low sodium chloride concentrations, but C. vulgaris was more competitive under salt stress.
