= Podohedriella =

Scientific classification
- Kingdom: Plantae
- Division: Chlorophyta
- Class: Chlorophyceae
- Order: Sphaeropleales
- Family: Selenastraceae
- Genus: Podohedriella; Hindák

Type species
- Podohedriella falcata (Duringer) Hindák

Species
- Podohedriella carpatica; Podohedriella falcata; Podohedriella recta

Genus of algae

Podohedriella is a genus of green algae in the family Selenastraceae. It is found in freshwater habitats or on damp wood.

== Description ==
Podohedriella consists of single cells or colonies of two, four, or eight cells, which are attached by one end to a substrate. Cells are 17 to 50 μm long and 1.5 to 4 μm wide, and fusiform to crescent-shaped or sigmoidal in outline. Cells are heteropolar; the apical and basal ends are both pointed, but the apical ends are more sharply so. Cells contain a single nucleus and a single parietal chloroplast with pyrenoids; however, the pyrenoids lack a starch sheath.

As with other algae in the family Selenastraceae, reproduction occurs exclusively via autospores.

== Taxonomy ==
Podohedriella was circumscribed by the phycologist František Hindák in 1988. He separated Podohedriella from the genus Podohedra by the absence of a pyrenoid. Its autospores are also arranged in parallel (versus serially in Podohedra). The former characteristic is ambiguous; algae in the family Selenastraceae were often considered to lack pyrenoids. Pyrenoids are typically present, but may be impossible to view with light microscopy without staining.
