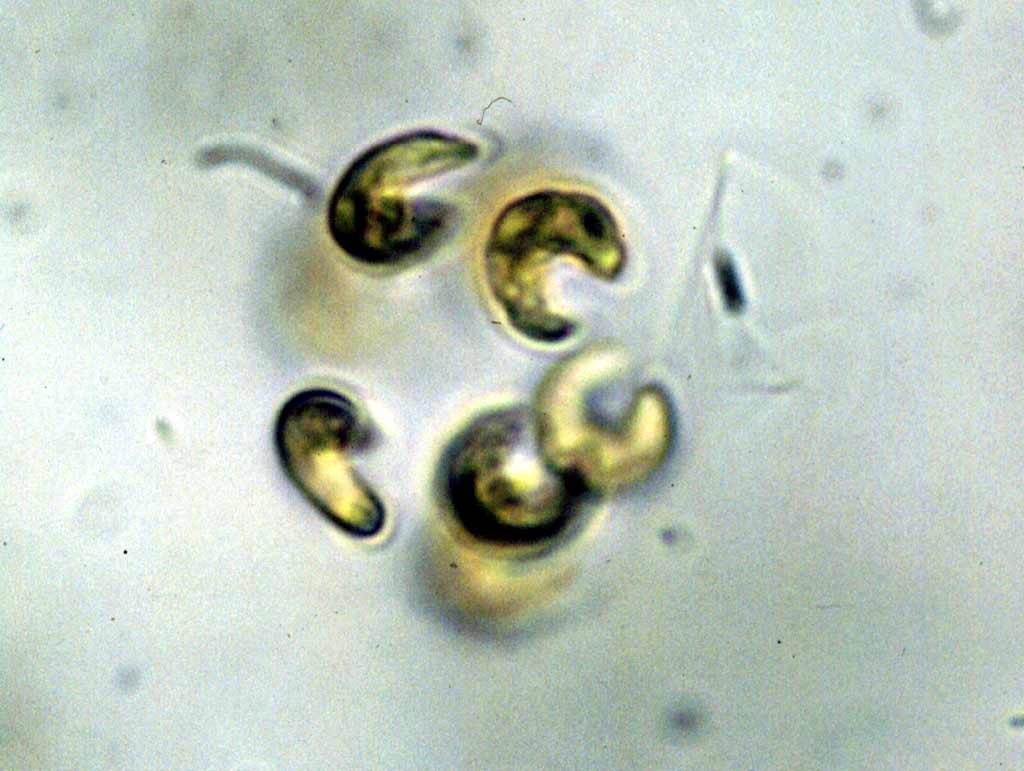
- Kirchneriella lunaris

Scientific classification
- Kingdom: Plantae
- Division: Chlorophyta
- Class: Chlorophyceae
- Order: Sphaeropleales
- Family: Selenastraceae
- Genus: Kirchneriella; Schmidle

Type species
- Kirchneriella lunaris (Kirchner) Möbius

Species
- Kirchneriella aperta; Kirchneriella lunaris

= Kirchneriella =

Genus of algae

Kirchneriella is a genus of green algae in the family Selenastraceae. It is found in freshwater habitats, as phytoplankton or metaphyton.

The genus name of Kirchneriella is in honour of Emil Otto Oskar von Kirchner (1851–1925), who was a German botanist and agronomist.

The genus was circumscribed by Wilhelm Schmidle in Ber. Naturf. Ges. Freiburg vol.7 on page 82 in 189.

== Description ==
Kirchneriella usually consists of colonies of cells within a thin layer of mucilage. Usually four to 16 are present within a colony, but sometimes they are solitary. Cells are crescent-shaped, containing a single chloroplast with one pyrenoid. They are irregularly distributed within the mucilage.

Species are distinguished from each other based on cell size and shape. The similar genus Pseudokirchneriella was split off from Kirchneriella; it differs from this genus in that its cells lack a pyrenoid. Some authors do not recognize the two genera as being distinct.

== Reproduction ==
Kirchneriella reproduces by autospores, which are arranged serially within the mother cell. They are released by rupture of the mother cell wall.

== Known species ==
According to GBIF;

- Kirchneriella aperta Teiling
- Kirchneriella arcuata G.S.Smith
- Kirchneriella dianae (Bohlin) Comas
- Kirchneriella incurvata J.H.Belcher & Swale
- Kirchneriella irregularis (G.M.Sm.) Korshikov
- Kirchneriella lunaris (Kirchner) Möbius, 1894
- Kirchneriella obesa (G.S.West) Schmidle
- Kirchneriella obesa (West) West & G.S.West
- Kirchneriella pinguis Hindák
- Kirchneriella roselata Hindák
