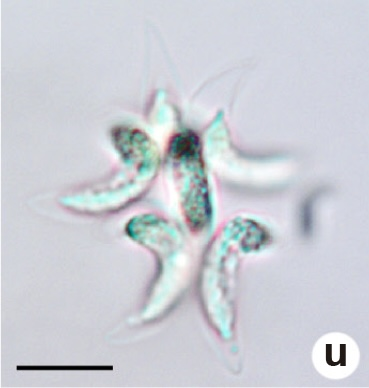
- Selenastrum bibraianum

Scientific classification
- Kingdom: Plantae
- Division: Chlorophyta
- Class: Chlorophyceae
- Order: Sphaeropleales
- Family: Selenastraceae
- Genus: Selenastrum; Reinsch

Type species
- Selenastrum bibraianum Reinsch, 1866

Species
- Selenastrum bibraianum; Selenastrum bifidum; Selenastrum densum; Selenastrum rinoi; Selenastrum subtile; Selenastrum westii

= Selenastrum =

Genus of algae

Selenastrum is a genus of green algae in the family Selenastraceae. It is common in freshwater habitats around the world. Most species prefer temperate or warm-temperate waters.

The genus was circumscribed by the German phycologist Paul Friedrich Reinsch in 1866. The name Selenastrum comes from the Greek roots selene, meaning "moon", and astron, meaning "star".

== Description ==
Selenastrum forms colonies of cells, numbering four, eight, 16, or 32. Cells are strongly curved and crescent-shaped, with pointed ends; the cells are attached to each other on their convex sides. Each cell contains a single parietal chloroplast.

Like other members of the family, Selenastrum reproduces asexually, by forming autospores. Zoospores and sexual reproduction have not been observed in this genus.

== Taxonomy ==
Selenastrum has had an unstable taxonomic history. Selenastrum is distinguished from the similar and related genus Ankistrodesmus by the curvature of the cells; Selenastrum has more strongly curved cells. The two genera have sometimes been considered congeneric, but molecular phylogenetic studies have shown them to be found in different clades.

In 2016, the genera Messastrum and Curvastrum were created, differing from Selenastrum mainly in their 18S rDNA and rbcL gene sequences. Curvastrum additionally differs from Selenastrum in its colony size, forming solitary cells or colonies of up to four cells. Both genera are monotypic, containing the species Messastrum gracile (formerly Selenastrum gracile) and Curvastrum pantanale, respectively.
