= Pseudokirchneriella =

Scientific classification
- Clade: Viridiplantae
- Division: Chlorophyta
- Class: Chlorophyceae
- Order: Sphaeropleales
- Family: Selenastraceae
- Genus: Pseudokirchneriella; F.Hindák

Species
- Pseudokirchneriella elongata

Genus of algae

Pseudokirchneriella is a genus of green algae in the family Selenastraceae. It is found as phytoplankton in freshwater ponds, lakes, and pools. It has been reported from Europe and North America.

== Description ==
Pseudokirchneriella usually consists of colonies of cells within a thin layer of mucilage. Usually two to 32 are present within a colony. Cells are crescent-shaped, with pointed to rounded ends. The cell wall is uniformly smooth without any ornamentation. Cells are uninucleate (with a single nucleus) and a single parietal chloroplast. Cells are irregularly distributed within the mucilage.

Pseudokirchneriella was split off from its congener Kirchneriella by the absence of a pyrenoid. Not all authors recognize the two genera as being distinct.
