= Elbert Halvor Ahlstrom =

American biologist (1910–1979)

- Born: February 15, 1910; Philadelphia, United States
- Died: August 27, 1979 (aged 69); New Orleans, United States
- Known for: Pioneering studies of fish populations using systematic sampling of eggs and larvae
- Scientific career
- Fields: Professor, ichthyologist, zoologist, botanist, algologist
- Institutions: U.S. Fish and Wildlife Service; National Marine Fisheries Service
- Author abbrev. (botany): Ahlstrom
- Author abbrev. (zoology): Ahlstrom

Elbert Halvor Ahlstrom (February 15, 1910 – August 27, 1979) was an American professor, ichthyologist, zoologist, botanist, and phycologist.

As an ichthyologist and senior scientist, he worked for more than 40 years with the National Marine Fisheries Service, previously with the U.S. Fish and Wildlife Service and the Bureau of Commercial Fisheries. He played a decisive role in developing methods to evaluate marine fish populations by systematic sampling of fish eggs and larvae.

In 1984 an International Symposium was held dedicated to the memory of Elbert Halvor Ahlstrom.

== Works ==
- 2013. A Quantitative Study of Rotatoria in Terwilliger's Pond, Put-In-Bay. Ohio Biological Survey V1 (1), Bulletin 30. Literary Licensing, LLC, 38 pp. ISBN 1258572079.
- 1984. Ontogeny and Systematics of Fishes: Based on an International Symposium Dedicated to the Memory of Elbert Halvor Ahlstrom, August 15–18, 1983, La Jolla, Calif. Vol. 1. Special Publication, American Society of Ichthyologists and Herpetologists. Edited by H. G. Moser and University of Kansas, 760 pp.
- 1959. Sardine Eggs and Larvae and Other Fish Larvae. U.S. Fish and Wildlife Service, Special Scientific Report, Fisheries, Vol. 328, 99 pp.
- 1958. High-speed Plankton Sampler. With J.D. Isaacs. Fishery Bulletin. U.S. Government Printing Office, 28 pp.
- 1934. The Algal Genus Scenedesmus. Ohio State University, 182 pp.
- 1933. Plankton Algae of Lake Michigan. Ohio State University, 50 pp.
