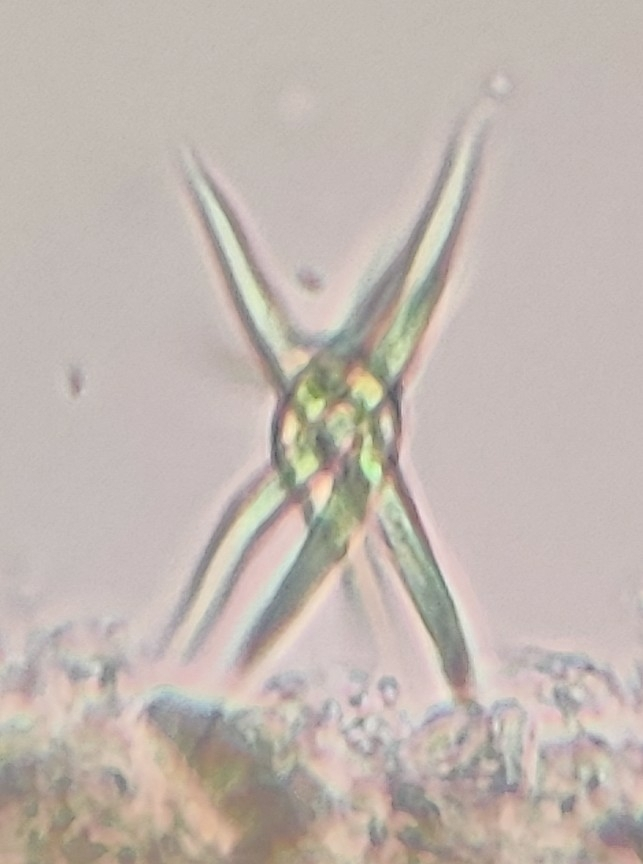
- Ankistrodesmus spiralis

Scientific classification
- Kingdom: Plantae
- Division: Chlorophyta
- Class: Chlorophyceae
- Order: Sphaeropleales
- Family: Selenastraceae; Blackman & Tansley

Genera
- Ankistrodesmus; Chlorolobion; Curvastrum; Drepanochloris; Gregiochloris; Kirchneriella; Messastrum; Monoraphidium; Planktococcomyxa; Podohedriella; Pseudokirchneriella; Pseudoquadrigula; Quadrigula; Raphidocelis; Selenastrum; Viridiparva

= Selenastraceae =

Family of algae

Selenastraceae is a family of green algae in the order Sphaeropleales. Members of this family are common components of the phytoplankton in freshwater habitats worldwide. A few species have been found in brackish and marine habitats, such as in the Baltic Sea.

== Description ==
The family Selenastraceae includes solitary cells or colonies of cells. Cells are diverse in morphology; they may be coccoid to spindle-shaped in shape, with rounded or pointed ends. They may be sickle-shaped or spirally curved. Cells contain a chloroplast with a pyrenoid. Except in the genus Chlorolobion, the pyrenoid lacks a starch covering, making it difficult to observe using light microscopy. Cells range in size from 5 to 105 μm in length and 1.5 to 6.5 μm in width.

Algae in this family reproduce asexually, exclusively by autospores. A distinguishing characteristic of this family is the method of autospore formation: the protoplast divides serially, with divisions being perpendicular to the longer axis of the cell. Once divided, the daughter cells realign to become parallel with the daughter cell, and are then released.

== Taxonomy ==
Selenastraceae is monophyletic. Traditionally, genera and species have been defined based on morphological features, such as habit (solitary or colonial), cell shape, presence or absence of mucilage, and presence and absence of pyrenoids. However, both genera and species have been shown to be polyphyletic.

The genus Closteriopsis consists of narrow, sickle-shaped cells with one chloroplast and multiple pyrenoids. It has been placed in the Selenastraceae due to its morphological similarity to genera such as Monoraphidium, but genetic analyses have shown that it is unrelated. It is currently placed in the family Chlorellaceae.

== Uses ==
Some varieties of Selenastraceae, mainly from Monoraphidium and Ankistrodesmus, are promising candidates for biodiesel production. These strains produce large amounts of lipids under optimal growth conditions. Some strains may also be suitable for cultivation in wastewater, which would cut production costs.
