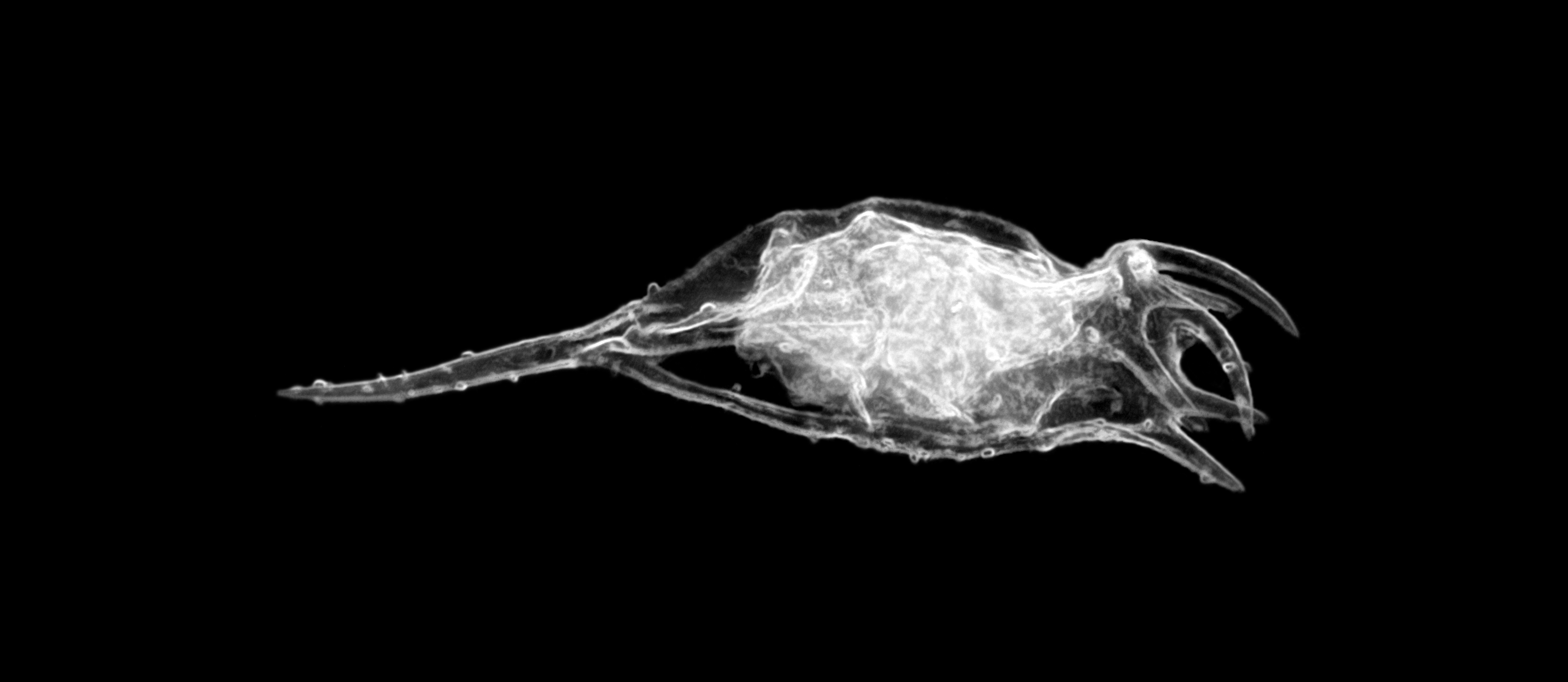
- Kellicottia bostoniensis

Scientific classification
- Domain: Eukaryota
- Kingdom: Animalia
- Phylum: Rotifera
- Class: Monogononta
- Order: Ploima
- Family: Brachionidae; Ehrenberg, 1838

= Brachionidae =

Family of rotifers

Brachionidae is a family of rotifers belonging to the order Ploima. Species are found in freshwater and marine habitats.

== Description ==
Rotifers in the family Brachionidae range from 170 to 250 μm, and possess a lorica. The lorica is in a single piece and lacks any furrows, groovese, sulci, or dorsal head shields.

The family contains seven genera:

- Anuraeopsis Lauterborn, 1900
- Brachionus Pallas, 1766 (incl. Schizocerca)
- Kellicottia Ahlstrom, 1938
- Keratella Bory de St.Vincent, 1822
- Notholca Gosse, 1886
- Plationus Segers, Murugan & Dumont, 1993
- Platyias Harring, 1913
