= Albertia naidis =

Scientific classification
- Kingdom: Animalia
- Phylum: Rotifera
- Class: Monogononta
- Order: Ploima
- Family: Dicranophoridae
- Genus: Albertia
- Species: A. naidis

Binomial name
- Albertia naidis Bousfield, 1886

Species of rotifer

Albertia naidis is a species of rotifer belonging to the family Dicranophoridae.

Synonym:

- Albertia bernardi Hlava, 1904
