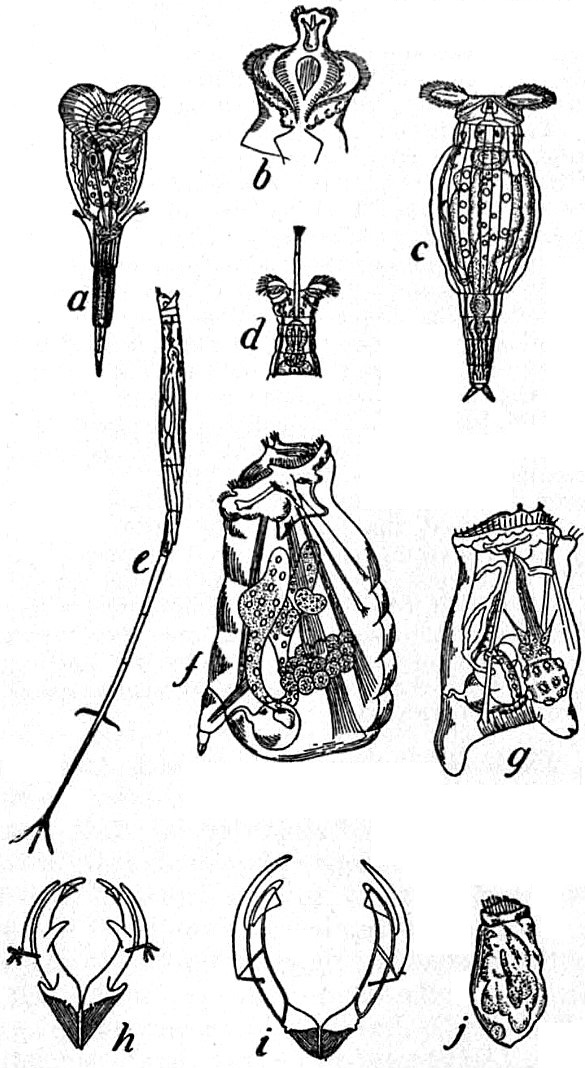
- figure h is the incudate jaws of Aplanchna brightwellii

Scientific classification
- Domain: Eukaryota
- Kingdom: Animalia
- Phylum: Rotifera
- Class: Monogononta
- Order: Ploima
- Family: Asplanchnidae
- Genus: Asplanchna
- Species: A. brightwellii

Binomial name
- Asplanchna brightwellii Gosse, 1850

= Asplanchna brightwellii =

Species of rotifer

Asplanchna brightwellii are a species of rotifer from the genus Asplanchna. They are known to inhabit eutrophic water. The sac-like freshwater rotifier is known to eat cladocerans, protozoans, and other rotifers. A. brightwelli are relatively large for rotifiers, transparent and ovoviviparous which makes the species ideal for morphological studies.
