= Cephalodella elegans =

Scientific classification
- Domain: Eukaryota
- Kingdom: Animalia
- Phylum: Rotifera
- Class: Monogononta
- Order: Ploima
- Family: Notommatidae
- Genus: Cephalodella
- Species: C. elegans

Binomial name
- Cephalodella elegans Myers, 1924

Species of rotifer

Cephalodella elegans is a species of rotifers in the family Notommatidae.
