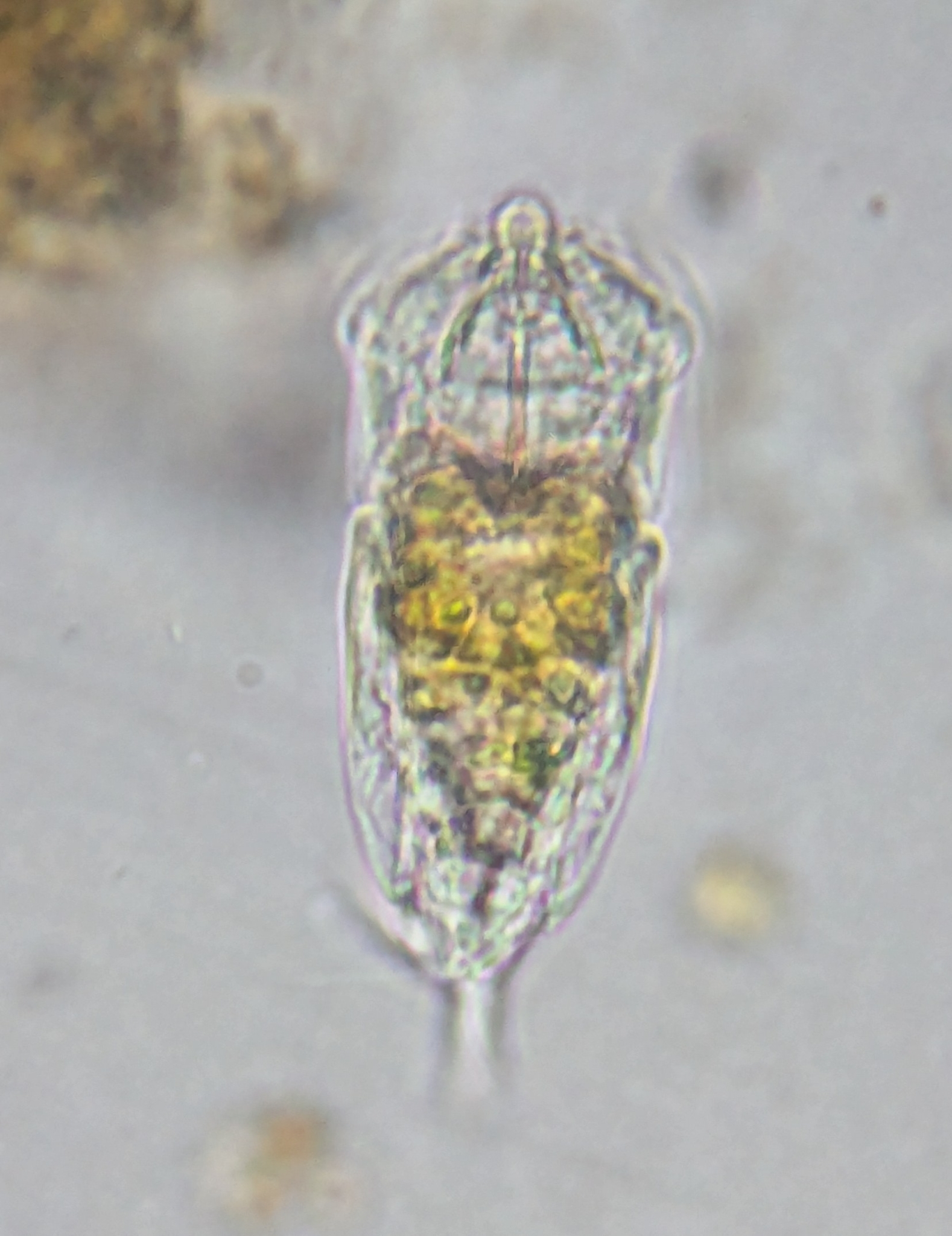
- Cephalodella auriculata

Scientific classification
- Domain: Eukaryota
- Kingdom: Animalia
- Phylum: Rotifera
- Class: Monogononta
- Order: Ploima
- Family: Notommatidae
- Genus: Cephalodella; Bory de St. Vincent, 1826

Species
- List of Species: Cephalodella ablusa; Cephalodella abstrusa; Cephalodella akrobeles; Cephalodella anebodica; Cephalodella angusta; Cephalodella apocolea; Cephalodella arcuata; Cephalodella asarcia; Cephalodella asta; Cephalodella astricta; Cephalodella auritculata; Cephalodella balatonica; Cephalodella belone; Cephalodella bertonicensis; Cephalodella biungulata; Cephalodella boettgeri; Cephalodella brandorffi; Cephalodella calosa; Cephalodella carina; Cephalodella catellina; Cephalodella celeris; Cephalodella clara; Cephalodella collactea; Cephalodella compacta; Cephalodella compressa; Cephalodella conica; Cephalodella conjuncta; Cephalodella crassipes; Cephalodella cyclops; Cephalodella decidua; Cephalodella delicata; Cephalodella dentata; Cephalodella derbyi; Cephalodella dixonnutalli; Cephalodella dora; Cephalodella dorseyi; Cephalodella doryphora; Cephalodella dorystoma; Cephalodella edax; Cephalodella elegans; Cephalodella elongata; Cephalodella euderbyi; Cephalodella euknema; Cephalodella eunoma; Cephalodella eupoda; Cephalodella eurynota; Cephalodella eva; Cephalodella evabroedae; Cephalodella exigua; Cephalodella fluviatilis; Cephalodella forceps; Cephalodella forficata; Cephalodella forficula; Cephalodella friebei; Cephalodella gibba; Cephalodella gibboides; Cephalodella gigantea; Cephalodella gisleni; Cephalodella glandulosa; Cephalodella globata; Cephalodella glypha; Cephalodella gobio; Cephalodella gracilis; Cephalodella graciosa; Cephalodella gusuleaci; Cephalodella harringi; Cephalodella hiulca; Cephalodella hollowdayi; Cephalodella hoodii; Cephalodella hyalina; Cephalodella incila; Cephalodella innesi; Cephalodella inquilina; Cephalodella intuta; Cephalodella irisae; Cephalodella jakubskii; Cephalodella jersabeki; Cephalodella labiosa; Cephalodella laisi; Cephalodella latifulcrum; Cephalodella lepida; Cephalodella licina; Cephalodella licinia; Cephalodella limosa; Cephalodella lindamayae; Cephalodella lipara; Cephalodella macrodactyla; Cephalodella maior; Cephalodella marina; Cephalodella megalocephala; Cephalodella megalotrocha; Cephalodella melia; Cephalodella mineri; Cephalodella minora; Cephalodella mira; Cephalodella misgurnus; Cephalodella monica; Cephalodella montana; Cephalodella mucosa; Cephalodella mucronata; Cephalodella mus; Cephalodella nana; Cephalodella nelitis; Cephalodella obesa; Cephalodella obvia; Cephalodella oxydactyla; Cephalodella pachydactyla; Cephalodella pachyodon; Cephalodella paggiae; Cephalodella panarista; Cephalodella papillosa; Cephalodella parasitica; Cephalodella paxi; Cephalodella paxilla; Cephalodella pentaplax; Cephalodella pheloma; Cephalodella physalis; Cephalodella planera; Cephalodella plicata; Cephalodella poitera; Cephalodella praelonga; Cephalodella psammophila; Cephalodella pseudeva; Cephalodella qionghaiensis; Cephalodella reimanni; Cephalodella retusa; Cephalodella rigida; Cephalodella rostrum; Cephalodella rotunda; Cephalodella segersi; Cephalodella somniculosa; Cephalodella songkhlaensis; Cephalodella speciosa; Cephalodella stenroosi; Cephalodella sterea; Cephalodella strigosa; Cephalodella subsecunda; Cephalodella tachyphora; Cephalodella tantilla; Cephalodella tantilloides; Cephalodella tecta; Cephalodella tempesta; Cephalodella tenuior; Cephalodella tenuis; Cephalodella tenuiseta; Cephalodella theodora; Cephalodella tinca; Cephalodella tincaformis; Cephalodella trigona; Cephalodella unguitata; Cephalodella ungulata; Cephalodella vacuna; Cephalodella ventripes; Cephalodella vitella; Cephalodella vittata; Cephalodella volvocicola; Cephalodella wrighti; Cephalodella xenica; Cephalodella zeteta

Synonyms
- Metadiaschiza Fadeew, 1925; Paracephalodella Bērziņš, 1976; Plagiognatha Dujardin, 1841

= Cephalodella =

Genus of rotifers

Movie of Rotifer, feeding (probably of the genus Cephalodella)

Cephalodella is a genus of rotifers in the family Notommatidae, with 190 species worldwide.

Cephalodella vittata is a species endemic to Lake Baikal.

== Selected species ==
- Cephalodella auritculata
- Cephalodella catellina
- Cephalodella elegans
- Cephalodella forficata
- Cephalodella forficula
- Cephalodella gibba (Ehrenberg, 1830)
- Cephalodella hoodi
- Cephalodella marina Myers, 1924
- Cephalodella sterea
- Cephalodella vittata
