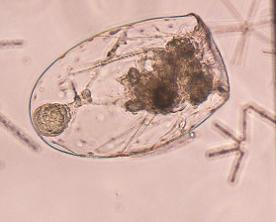
- Asplanchna priodontata

Scientific classification
- Domain: Eukaryota
- Kingdom: Animalia
- Phylum: Rotifera
- Class: Monogononta
- Order: Ploima
- Family: Asplanchnidae
- Genus: Asplanchna; Gosse, 1850

Synonyms
- Aplanchna Gosse, 1850

= Asplanchna =

Genus of rotifers

Asplanchna is a genus of rotifers belonging to the family Asplanchnidae.

The genus has cosmopolitan distribution.

Species:

- Asplanchna brightwellii Gosse, 1850
- Aplanchna priodonta Gosse, 1850
- Aplanchna asymmetrica Shiel & Koste, 1985
- Aplanchna girodi de Guerne, 1888
- Aplanchna herricki de Guerne, 1888
- Aplanchna intermedia Hudson, 1886
- Aplanchna sieboldii (Leydig, 1854)
- Aplanchna silvestrii Daday, 1902
- Aplanchna tropica Koste & Tobias, 1989
