= Eosphora =

Scientific classification
- Domain: Eukaryota
- Kingdom: Animalia
- Phylum: Rotifera
- Class: Monogononta
- Order: Ploima
- Family: Notommatidae
- Genus: Eosphora; Ehrenberg, 1830

Synonyms
- Heosphora Agassiz, 1846; Eospora Whitelegge, 1889; Eosophora Hilgendorf, 1903

Genus of rotifers

Eosphora is a genus of rotifers belonging to the family Notommatidae.

The species of this genus are found in Europe, Australia and Northern America.

== Species ==
- Eosphora anthadis Harring & Myers, 1922
- Eosphora ehrenbergi Weber, 1918
- Eosphora gibba Garner, 1937
- Eosphora najas Ehrenberg, 1830
- Eosphora therina Harring & Myers, 1922
- Eosphora thoa Harring & Myers, 1924
- Eosphora thoides Wulfert, 1935
