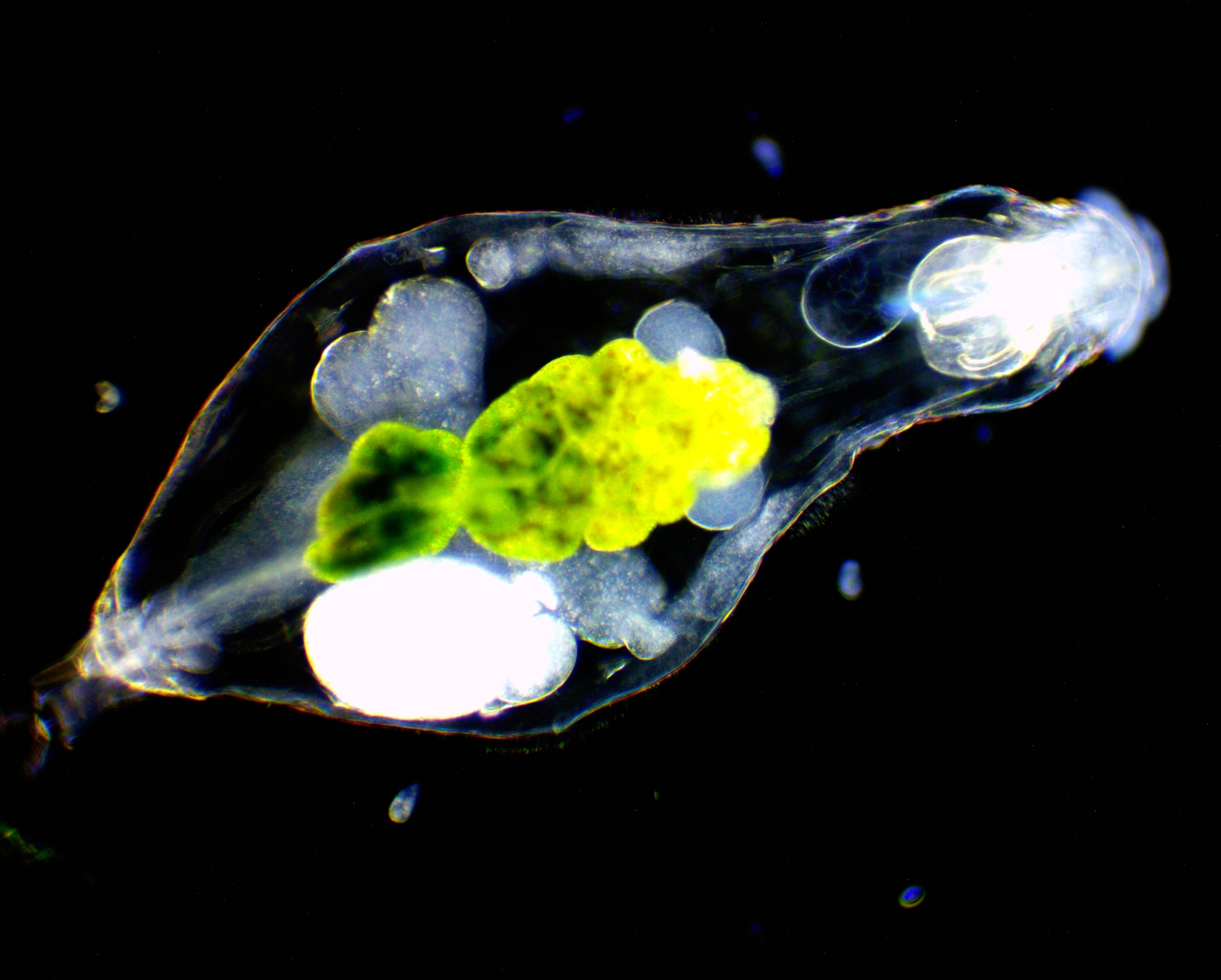
- Notommata copeus

Scientific classification
- Domain: Eukaryota
- Kingdom: Animalia
- Phylum: Rotifera
- Class: Monogononta
- Order: Ploima
- Family: Notommatidae
- Genus: Notommata; Ehrenberg, 1830

= Notommata =

Genus of rotifers

Notommata is a genus of rotifers belonging to the family Notommatidae.

The genus has almost cosmopolitan distribution.

Species:

List of Species
  - Notommata aethis Myers, 1933
  - Notommata allantois Wulfert, 1935
  - Notommata angusta Harring & Myers, 1922
  - Notommata apochaeta Myers, 1933
  - Notommata aurita (Müller, 1786)
  - Notommata avena Myers, 1933
  - Notommata bennetchi Myers, 1942
  - Notommata brachyota Ehrenberg, 1832
  - Notommata cerberus (Gosse, 1886)
  - Notommata cherada Myers, 1938
  - Notommata codonella Harring & Myers, 1924
  - Notommata collaris Ehrenberg, 1832
  - Notommata contorta (Stokes, 1897)
  - Notommata copeus Ehrenberg, 1834
  - Notommata cyrtopus Gosse, 1886
  - Notommata diasema Myers, 1936
  - Notommata doneta Harring & Myers, 1924
  - Notommata endoxa Myers, 1933
  - Notommata fasciola Myers, 1933
  - Notommata falcinella Harring & Myers, 1922
  - Notommata galena Harring & Myers, 1922
  - Notommata gisleni Berzinš, 1949
  - Notommata glyphura Wulfert, 1935
  - Notommata groenlandica Bergendal, 1892
  - Notommata haueri Wulfert, 1939
  - Notommata lenis Harring & Myers, 1922
  - Notommata longina Pourriot, 1995
  - Notommata mera Donner, 1970
  - Notommata omentata Wulfert, 1939
  - Notommata pachyura Gosse, 1886
  - Notommata paracyrtopus de Beauchamp, 1932
  - Notommata peridia Harring & Myers, 1922
  - Notommata placida Harring & Myers, 1922
  - Notommata prodota Myers, 1933
  - Notommata pseudocerberus de Beauchamp, 1908
  - Notommata pygmaea Harring & Myers, 1922
  - Notommata rugosa Myers, 1933
  - Notommata saccigera Ehrenberg, 1830
  - Notommata silpha (Gosse, 1887)
  - Notommata silphoides de Beauchamp, 1923
  - Notommata spinata Koste & Shiel, 1991
  - Notommata stitista Myers, 1937
  - Notommata thopica Harring & Myers, 1924
  - Notommata tripus Ehrenberg, 1838
  - Notommata venusta Harring & Myers, 1922
  - Notommata veroleti Pourriot, 2006
  - Notommata voigti Donner, 1949
  - Notommata weberi Voigt, 1957
