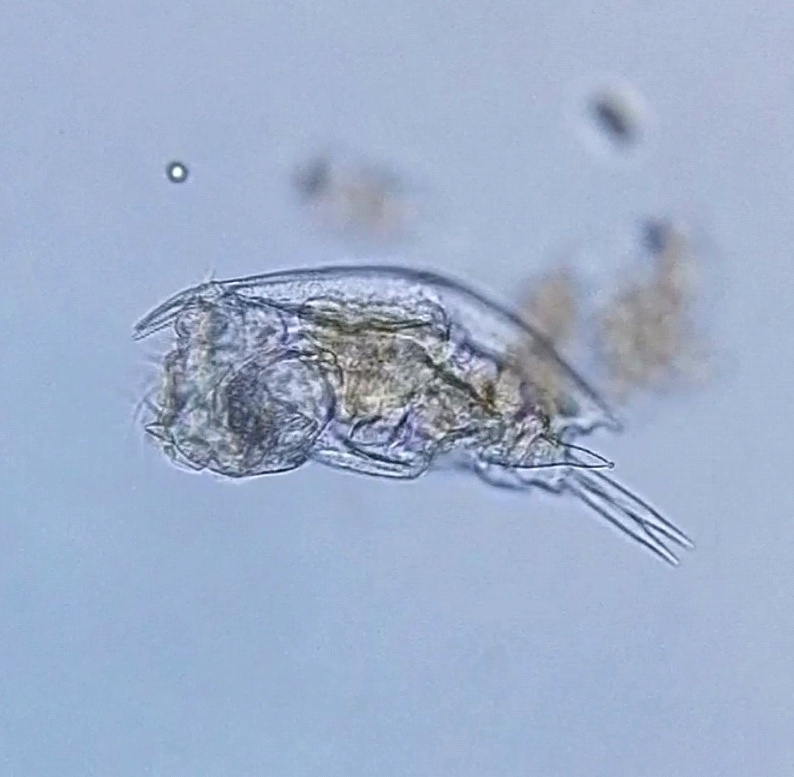
- Mytilina mucronata

Scientific classification
- Domain: Eukaryota
- Kingdom: Animalia
- Phylum: Rotifera
- Class: Monogononta
- Order: Ploima
- Family: Mytilinidae
- Genus: Mytilina; Bory de St.Vincent, 1826

= Mytilina =

Genus of rotifers

Mytilina is a genus of rotifers belonging to the family Mytilinidae.

The genus has almost cosmopolitan distribution.

Species:

- Mytilina acanthophora Hauer, 1938
- Mytilina bicarinata (Perty, 1850)
- Mytilina bisulcata (Lucks, 1912)
- Mytilina carpatica Varga, 1962
- Mytilina compressa (Gosse, 1851)
- Mytilina crassipes (Lucks, 1912)
- Mytilina lobata Pourriot, 1996
- Mytilina macrocera (Jennings, 1894)
- Mytilina macrocerca (Jennings, 1894)
- Mytilina michelangellii Reid & Turner, 1988
- Mytilina mucronata (Müller, 1773)
- Mytilina mutica (Perty, 1849)
- Mytilina trigona (Gosse, 1851)
- Mytilina unguipes (Lucks, 1912)
- Mytilina ventralis (Ehrenberg, 1830)
- Mytilina videns (Levander, 1894)
- Mytilina wangi Luo & Segers, 2014
