= Bryceella =

Scientific classification
- Domain: Eukaryota
- Kingdom: Animalia
- Phylum: Rotifera
- Class: Monogononta
- Order: Ploima
- Family: Proalidae
- Genus: Bryceella; Remane, 1929

Genus of rotifers

Bryceella is a genus of rotifers belonging to the family Proalidae.

The species of this genus are found in Europe.

Species:

- Bryceella perpusilla Wilts, Martinez Arbizu & Ahlrichs, 2010
- Bryceella stylata (Milne, 1886)
