= Pleurotrocha =

Scientific classification
- Domain: Eukaryota
- Kingdom: Animalia
- Phylum: Rotifera
- Class: Monogononta
- Order: Ploima
- Family: Notommatidae
- Genus: Pleurotrocha; Ehrenberg, 1830

Genus of rotifers

Pleurotrocha is a genus of rotifers belonging to the family Notommatidae.

The species of this genus are found in Europe and Antarctica.

Species:

- Pleurotrocha altanica Myers, 1936
- Pleurotrocha altila Myers, 1940
- Pleurotrocha altilis Myers, 1940
- Pleurotrocha atlantica Myers, 1936
- Pleurotrocha aurea (Zavadovsky, 1916)
- Pleurotrocha chalicodis Myers, 1933
- Pleurotrocha channa Myers, 1933
- Pleurotrocha daphnicola (Thompson, 1892)
- Pleurotrocha elegans Zavadovsky, 1926
- Pleurotrocha fontanetoi De Smet, 2015
- Pleurotrocha larvarum Vlastov, 1956
- Pleurotrocha petromyzon Ehrenberg, 1830
- Pleurotrocha robusta (Glascott, 1893)
- Pleurotrocha sigmoidea Skorikov, 1896
- Pleurotrocha thrua Myers, 1933
