= Wolga spinifera =

Scientific classification
- Kingdom: Animalia
- Phylum: Rotifera
- Class: Monogononta
- Order: Ploima
- Family: Trichotriidae
- Genus: Wolga; Skorikov, 1903
- Species: W. spinifera

Binomial name
- Wolga spinifera (Western, 1894)

Synonyms
- Species synonymy: Distyla spinifera Western, 1894

Genus of rotifers

Wolga is a monotypic genus of rotifers belonging to the family Trichotriidae. The only species is Wolga spinifera.

The species is found in Europe.
