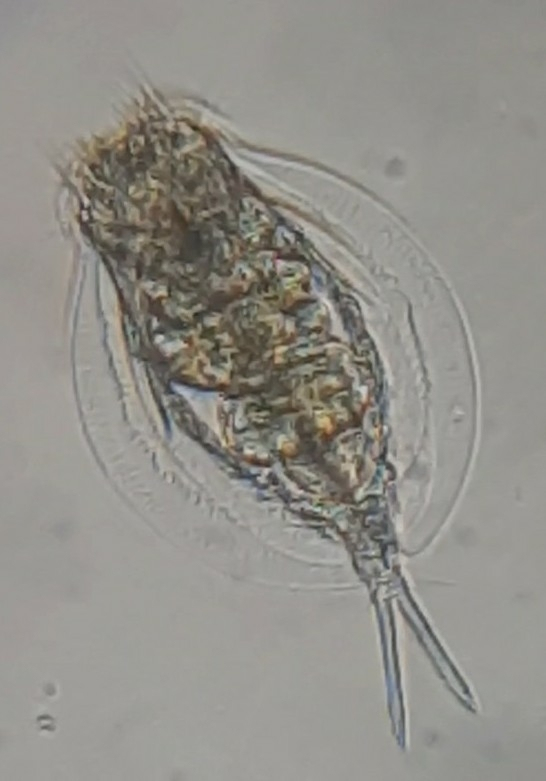
- Euchlanis triquetra

Scientific classification
- Kingdom: Animalia
- Phylum: Rotifera
- Class: Monogononta
- Order: Ploima
- Family: Euchlanidae
- Genus: Euchlanis; Ehrenberg, 1830

Species
- See text.

Synonyms
- Dapidia Gosse, 1887; Enchlanis Braum, 1884

= Euchlanis =

Genus of rotifers

Euchlanis is a genus of rotifers belonging to the family Euchlanidae.

Sometimes alternatively referred to as wheel animalcules, rotifers feature a characteristic circular arrangement of cilia at their front ends that is reminiscent of a turning wheel when they are in motion. The genus has a cosmopolitan distribution.

== Description ==
Rotifers have a characteristic circular arrangement of cilia at their front ends. These cilia are used to bring food particles, including bacteria, debris and small protozoans, towards the mouth. A mastax, a jaw-like structure, grinds the food as it enters the stomach. Excretory structures known as flame cells create a current that drains them into the intestines or the bladder. They have transparent bodies and two strong structures that are used for swimming. They are sheathed in a glassy shell secreted by their outer skin.

== Species ==
The following species are accepted:

- Euchlanis alata Voronkov, 1912
- Euchlanis arenosa Myers, 1936
- Euchlanis callimorpha Berzinš, 1957
- Euchlanis callysta Myers, 1930
- Euchlanis calpidia (Myers, 1930)
- Euchlanis contorta (Wulfert, 1939)
- Euchlanis dactyliseta Sudzuki, 1998
- Euchlanis dapidula Parise, 1966
- Euchlanis deflexa Gosse, 1851
- Euchlanis dilatata Ehrenberg, 1832
- Euchlanis hyphidactyla Parise, 1963
- Euchlanis incisa Carlin, 1939
- Euchlanis ligulata Kutikova & Vassiljeva, 1982
- Euchlanis lucksiana Hauer
- Euchlanis lyra Hudson, 1886
- Euchlanis mamorokaensis Berzinš, 1973
- Euchlanis meneta Myers, 1930
- Euchlanis mikropous Koch-Althaus, 1962
- Euchlanis oropha Gosse, 1887
- Euchlanis parameneta Berzinš, 1957
- Euchlanis perpusilla De Ridder, 1977
- Euchlanis phryne Myers, 1930
- Euchlanis pyriformis Gosse, 1851
- Euchlanis semicarinata Segers, 1993
- Euchlanis triquetra Ehrenberg, 1838
