= Aspelta (rotifer) =

Scientific classification
- Domain: Eukaryota
- Kingdom: Animalia
- Phylum: Rotifera
- Class: Monogononta
- Order: Ploima
- Family: Dicranophoridae
- Genus: Aspelta; Harring & Myers, 1928

Genus of rotifers

Aspelta is a genus of rotifers within the family Dicranophoridae. Members of this genus can be found in multiple areas throughout the world.

== Species ==
- Aspelta clydona Harring & Myers, 1928
- Aspelta europaea Hauer, 1939
- Aspelta harringi Remane, 1929
- Aspelta lestes Harring & Myers, 1928
- Aspelta pachida (Gosse, 1887)
- Aspelta reibischi (Remane, 1929)
