= Polyarthra =

Polyarthra may refer to two different groups of organisms:

- Polyarthra Lang, 1944, an order of crustaceans
- Polyarthra Ehrenberg, 1834, a genus of rotifers
