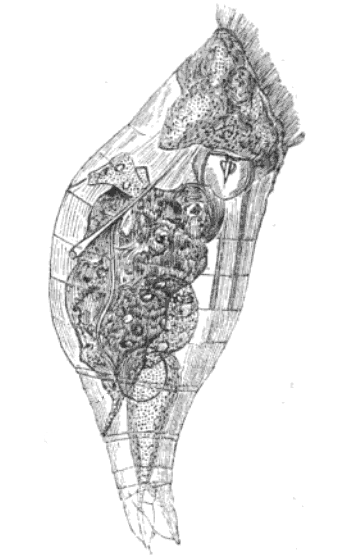
- Proales daphnicola

Scientific classification
- Kingdom: Animalia
- Phylum: Rotifera
- Class: Monogononta
- Order: Ploima
- Family: Proalidae
- Genus: Proales; Gosse, 1886

= Proales =

Genus of rotifers

Proales is a genus of rotifers belonging to the family Proalidae.

The genus has cosmopolitan distribution.

Species:

- Proales adenodis Myers, 1933
- Proales alba Wulfert, 1939
- Proales ardechensis De Smet & Verolet, 2009
- Proales baradlana Varga, 1959
- Proales bemata Myers, 1933
- Proales christinae De Smet, 1994
- Proales cognita Myers, 1940
- Proales commutata Althaus, 1957
- Proales coryneger
- Proales cryptopus Wulfert, 1935
- Proales daphnicola Thompson, 1892
- Proales decipiens (Ehrenberg, 1830)
- Proales doliaris (Rousselet, 1895)
- Proales fallaciosa Wulfert, 1937
- Proales francescae De Smet, 2015
- Proales gammaricola De Smet & Verolet, 2016
- Proales germanica Tzschaschel, 1979
- Proales gigantea (Glascott, 1893)
- Proales gladia Myers, 1933
- Proales globulifera (Hauer, 1921)
- Proales gonothyraeae Remane, 1929
- Proales granulosa Myers, 1933
- Proales halophila Remane, 1929
- Proales indirae Wulfert, 1966
- Proales kostei Nogrady & Smol, 1989
- Proales laticauda De Smet & Verolet, 2009
- Proales latrunculus Penard, 1909
- Proales lenta Vlastov, 1956
- Proales lenta Wlastow, 1956
- Proales litoralis De Smet, 1996
- Proales macrura Myers, 1933
- Proales micropus (Gosse, 1886)
- Proales minima (Montet, 1915)
- Proales oculata Tzschaschel, 1979
- Proales ornata Myers, 1933
- Proales othodon
- Proales paguri Thane-Fenchel, 1966
- Proales palimmeka Myers, 1940
- Proales parasita (Ehrenberg, 1838)
- Proales phaeopis Myers, 1933
- Proales prehensor
- Proales provida Wulfert, 1938
- Proales pugio Nogrady, 1983
- Proales reinhardti (Ehrenberg, 1834)
- Proales segnis Myers, 1938
- Proales similis de Beauchamp, 1907
- Proales simplex Wang, 1961
- Proales sordida Gosse, 1886
- Proales syltensis Tzschaschel, 1979
- Proales theodora (Gosse, 1887)
- Proales werneckii (Ehrenberg, 1834)
- Proales wesenbergi Wulfert, 1960
