= Beauchampiella =

Scientific classification
- Domain: Eukaryota
- Kingdom: Animalia
- Phylum: Rotifera
- Class: Monogononta
- Order: Ploima
- Family: Euchlanidae
- Genus: Beauchampiella; Remane, 1929
- Species: B. eudactylota

Binomial name
- Beauchampiella eudactylota (Gosse, 1886)

Genus of rotifers

Beauchampiella is a monotypic genus of rotifers belonging to the family Euchlanidae. The only species is Beauchampiella eudactylota.

The species is found in Central America.
