= Encentrum =

Scientific classification
- Domain: Eukaryota
- Kingdom: Animalia
- Phylum: Rotifera
- Class: Monogononta
- Order: Ploima
- Family: Dicranophoridae
- Genus: Encentrum; Ehrenberg, 1838

Synonyms
- Encentroides Sudzuki, 1960

Genus of rotifers

Encentrum is a genus of rotifers belonging to the family Dicranophoridae.

The genus has almost cosmopolitan distribution.

Species:

- Encentrum acrodon Wulfert, 1936
- Encentrum algente Harring, 1921
- Encentrum alpinum Jersabek, 1999
- Encentrum arenarium Althaus, 1957
- Encentrum astridae Sørensen, 2001
- Encentrum axi Tzschaschel, 1979
- Encentrum barti De Smet, 2000
- Encentrum bidentatum (Lie-Pettersen, 1906)
- Encentrum cruentum Harring & Myers, 1928
- Encentrum desmeti Jersabek, 1999
- Encentrum dieteri De Smet, 1995
- Encentrum enteromorphae Otto, 1936
- Encentrum eristes Harring & Myers, 1928
- Encentrum eulitorale Tzschaschel, 1979
- Encentrum flexile Godske Eriksen, 1968
- Encentrum forcipatum Dartnall, 1997
- Encentrum frenoti De Smet, 2002
- Encentrum goldschmidi Jersabek, 1999
- Encentrum graingeri Chengalath, 1985
- Encentrum gulo Wulfert, 1936
- Encentrum kostei Tzschaschel, 1979
- Encentrum kutikovae De Smet & Chernyshev, 2006
- Encentrum lacidum Harring & Myers, 1928
- Encentrum limicola Otto, 1936
- Encentrum listense Tzschaschel, 1979
- Encentrum listensoides De Smet, 2000
- Encentrum longirostrum Tzschaschel, 1979
- Encentrum lutra Wulfert, 1936
- Encentrum marinum (Dujardin, 1841)
- Encentrum martes Wulfert, 1939
- Encentrum matthesi Remane, 1949
- Encentrum mucronatum Wulfert, 1936
- Encentrum mustela (Milne, 1885)
- Encentrum myersi Wulfert, 1936
- Encentrum nesites Harring & Myers, 1928
- Encentrum obesum Tzschaschel, 1979
- Encentrum oculatum Harring & Myers, 1928
- Encentrum permolle (Gosse, 1886)
- Encentrum permutandum Tzschaschel, 1979
- Encentrum porsildi Sørensen, 1998
- Encentrum psammophilum Althaus, 1957
- Encentrum remanei Voigt, 1957
- Encentrum rousseleti (Lie-Pettersen, 1905)
- Encentrum sacculiforme Tzschaschel, 1979
- Encentrum salsum Myers, 1936
- Encentrum simillimum Remane, 1929
- Encentrum spatiatum Wulfert, 1936
- Encentrum striatum Althaus, 1957
- Encentrum tectipes Remane, 1949
- Encentrum tenuidigitatum De Smet, 2000
- Encentrum uncinatum (Milne, 1886)
- Encentrum ussuriensis De Smet & Chernyshev, 2006
- Encentrum valkanovi Althaus, 1957
- Encentrum villosum Harring & Myers, 1928
- Encentrum walterkostei Jersabek, 1994
- (incomplete list)
