= Coelopus =

Coelopus may refer to:

- Coelopus (crab), a fossil genus of crabs in the family Longodromitidae
- Coelopus, a genus of fungi in the family Gyroporaceae, synonym of Gyroporus
- Coelopus, a genus of rotifers in the family Trichocercidae, synonym of Trichocerca
