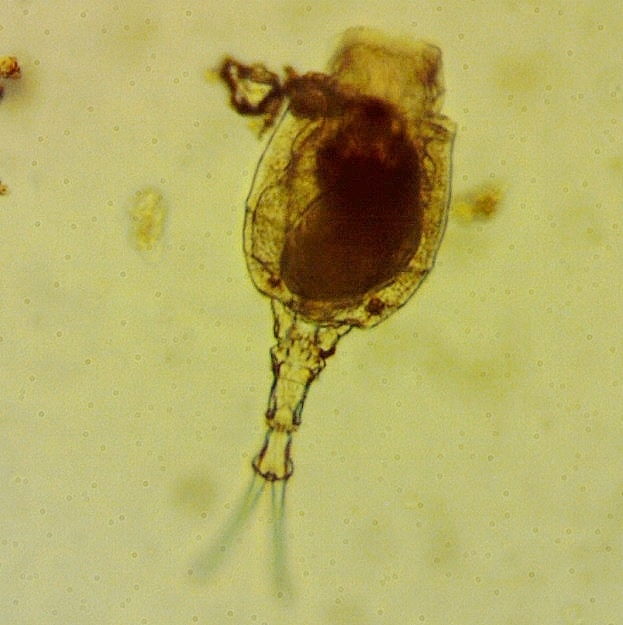
- Trichotria tetractis

Scientific classification
- Domain: Eukaryota
- Kingdom: Animalia
- Phylum: Rotifera
- Class: Monogononta
- Order: Ploima
- Family: Trichotriidae
- Genus: Trichotria; Bory de Saint-Vincent, 1827

= Trichotria =

Genus of rotifers

Trichotria is a genus of rotifers belonging to the family Trichotriidae.

The genus has almost cosmopolitan distribution.

Species:

- Trichotria brevidactyla Harring, 1913
- Trichotria buchneri Koste, Shiel & Tan, 1988
- Trichotria curta (Skorikov, 1914)
- Trichotria eukosmeta Myers, 1934
- Trichotria pocillum (Müller, 1776)
- Trichotria pseudocurta Koste, Shiel & Tan, 1988
- Trichotria tetractis (Ehrenberg, 1830)
- Trichotria truncata (Whitelegge, 1889)
- Trichotria zanclum Berzinš, 1982
