= Dicranophorus =

Scientific classification
- Domain: Eukaryota
- Kingdom: Animalia
- Phylum: Rotifera
- Class: Monogononta
- Order: Ploima
- Family: Dicranophoridae
- Genus: Dicranophorus; Nitzsch, 1827

Genus of rotifers

Dicranophorus is a genus of rotifers belonging to the family Dicranophoridae.

The genus has almost cosmopolitan distribution.

Species:

- Dicranophorus alcimus Harring & Myers, 1928
- Dicranophorus artamus Harring & Myers, 1928
- Dicranophorus aspondus Harring & Myers, 1928
- Dicranophorus biastis Harring & Myers, 1928
- Dicranophorus bulgaricus Althaus, 1957
- Dicranophorus cambari Wulfert, 1957
- Dicranophorus capucinus Harring & Myers, 1928
- Dicranophorus colastes Harring & Myers, 1928
- Dicranophorus corystis Harring & Myers, 1928
- Dicranophorus difflugiarum (Penard, 1914)
- Dicranophorus dolerus Harring & Myers, 1928
- Dicranophorus edestes Harring & Myers, 1928
- Dicranophorus epicharis Harring & Myers, 1928
- Dicranophorus esox Hauer, 1938
- Dicranophorus facilis Kutikova, 1985
- Dicranophorus facinus Harring & Myers, 1928
- Dicranophorus forcipatus (Müller, 1786)
- Dicranophorus grandis (Ehrenberg, 1832)
- Dicranophorus grypus Harring & Myers, 1928
- Dicranophorus halbachi Koste, 1981
- Dicranophorus haueri Harring & Myers, 1928
- Dicranophorus hauerianus Wiszniewski, 1939
- Dicranophorus hercules Wiszniewski, 1932
- Dicranophorus isothes Harring & Myers, 1928
- Dicranophorus kostei Pourriot & Zoppi de Roa, 1981
- Dicranophorus lenapensis Myers, 1938
- Dicranophorus leptodon Wiszniewski, 1934
- Dicranophorus luetkeni (Bergendal, 1892)
- Dicranophorus mesotis Harring & Myers, 1928
- Dicranophorus minutes Myers, 1937
- Dicranophorus myriophylli (Harring, 1913)
- Dicranophorus pauliani Berzinš, 1982
- Dicranophorus pennatus Harring & Myers, 1928
- Dicranophorus ponerus Harring & Myers, 1928
- Dicranophorus prionacis Harring & Myers, 1928
- Dicranophorus proclestes Harring & Myers, 1928
- Dicranophorus riparius Kutikova, 1985
- Dicranophorus robustus Harring & Myers, 1928
- Dicranophorus rostratus (Dixon-Nuttall & Freeman, 1902)
- Dicranophorus saevus Harring & Myers, 1928
- Dicranophorus scotius Harring & Myers, 1928
- Dicranophorus sebastus Harring & Myers, 1928
- Dicranophorus semnus Harring & Myers, 1928
- Dicranophorus siedleckii Wiszniewski, 1953
- Dicranophorus sigmoides Wulfert, 1950
- Dicranophorus spiculatus Myers, 1938
- Dicranophorus strigosus Harring & Myers, 1928
- Dicranophorus stultus Harring & Myers, 1928
- Dicranophorus tegillus Harring & Myers, 1928
- Dicranophorus thysanus Harring & Myers, 1928
