= Dipleuchlanis =

Scientific classification
- Kingdom: Animalia
- Phylum: Rotifera
- Class: Monogononta
- Order: Ploima
- Family: Euchlanidae
- Genus: Dipleuchlanis de Beauchamp, 1910

Genus of rotifers

Dipleuchlanis is a genus of rotifers belonging to the family Euchlanidae.

Species of this genus are found in Europe and North America.

== Species ==
- Dipleuchlanis elegans (Wierzejski, 1893)
- Dipleuchlanis ornata Segers, 1993
