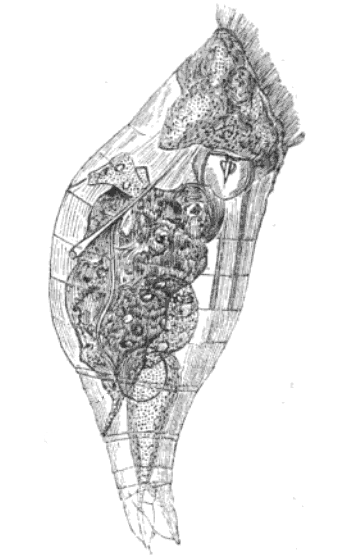
- Illustration of Epiphanes daphnicola

Scientific classification
- Domain: Eukaryota
- Kingdom: Animalia
- Phylum: Rotifera
- Class: Monogononta
- Order: Ploima
- Family: Epiphanidae
- Genus: Epiphanes; Ehrenberg, 1832

Species
- See text

= Epiphanes (rotifer) =

Genus of rotifers

Epiphanes is a genus of rotifers belonging to the family Epiphanidae.

The genus has an almost cosmopolitan distribution.

== Species ==
Epiphanes includes the following species:

- Epiphanes brachionus (Ehrenberg, 1837)
- Epiphanes chihuahuaensis Schröder & Walsh, 2007
- Epiphanes clavatula (Ehrenberg, 1832)
- Epiphanes desmeti Rougier & Pourriot, 2006
- Epiphanes hawaiensis Schröder & Walsh, 2007
- Epiphanes macroura (Barrois & Daday, 1894)
- Epiphanes pelagica (Jennings, 1900)
- Epiphanes senta (Müller, 1773)
- Epiphanes ukera Schröder & Walsh, 2007
