= Proalides =

Scientific classification
- Domain: Eukaryota
- Kingdom: Animalia
- Phylum: Rotifera
- Class: Monogononta
- Order: Ploima
- Family: Epiphanidae
- Genus: Proalides de Beauchamp, 1907

Genus of rotifers

Proalides is a genus of rotifers belonging to the family Epiphanidae.

The species of this genus are found in Europe.

Species:

- Proalides digitus Donner, 1978
- Proalides subtilis Rodewald, 1940
- Proalides tentaculatus de Beauchamp, 1907
