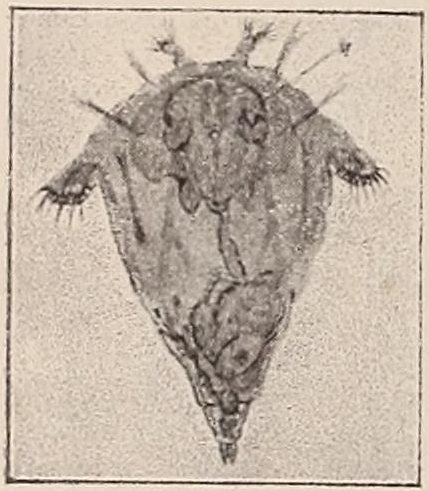
- Synchaeta pectinata

Scientific classification
- Kingdom: Animalia
- Phylum: Rotifera
- Class: Monogononta
- Order: Ploima
- Family: Synchaetidae
- Genus: Synchaeta; Ehrenberg, 1832

= Synchaeta =

Genus of rotifers

Synchaeta is a genus of rotifers belonging to the family Synchaetidae.

The genus has a cosmopolitan distribution. It is found in freshwater, marine, brackish, and inland saline habitats. These microscopic organisms play essential roles in aquatic food webs and nutrient cycling.

== Species ==
Species:

- Synchaeta arcifera Xu, 1998
- Synchaeta atlantica Zelinka, 1907
- Synchaeta bacillifera Smirnov, 1933
- Synchaeta baltica Ehrenberg, 1834
- Synchaeta pectinata Ehrenberg, 1832
