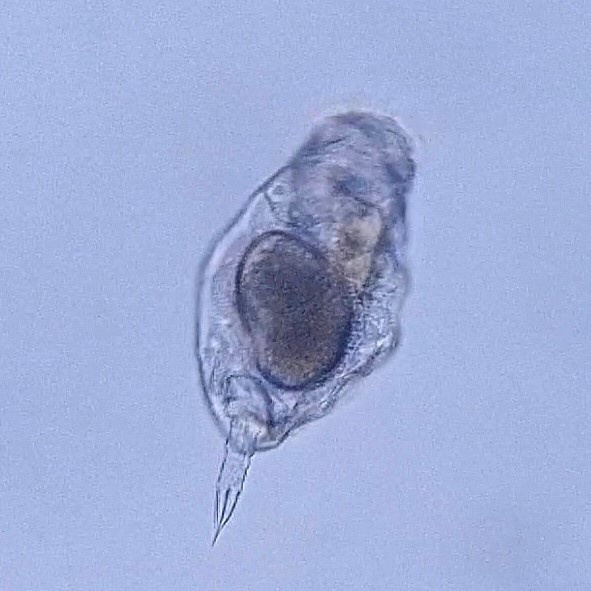

Scientific classification
- Kingdom: Animalia
- Phylum: Rotifera
- Class: Monogononta
- Order: Ploima
- Family: Mytilinidae
- Genus: Lophocharis; Ehrenberg, 1838

Synonyms
- Oxisterna Iroso, 1910; Oxysterna Iroso, 1910

= Lophocharis =

Genus of rotifers

Lophocharis is a genus of rotifers belonging to the family Mytilinidae.

The species of this genus are found in Eurasia.

== Species ==
The following species are recognised in the genus Lophocharis:

- Lophocharis ambidentata De Ridder, 1960
- Lophocharis curvata Berzinš, 1982
- Lophocharis hutchinsoni Edmondson, 1935
- Lophocharis kutikovae Mirabdullaev, 1992
- Lophocharis naias Wulfert, 1942
- Lophocharis oxysternon (Gosse, 1851)
- Lophocharis parva Rudescu, 1960
- Lophocharis rubens Wulfert, 1939
- Lophocharis salpina (Ehrenberg, 1834)
- Lophocharis turanica Mirabdullaev, 1992
- Lophocharis tutiurensis Sudzuki, 1998
