= Resticula =

Scientific classification
- Domain: Eukaryota
- Kingdom: Animalia
- Phylum: Rotifera
- Class: Monogononta
- Order: Ploima
- Family: Notommatidae
- Genus: Resticula; Harring & Myers, 1924

Genus of rotifers

Resticula is a genus of rotifers belonging to the family Notommatidae.

The genus has almost cosmopolitan distribution.

Species:

- Resticula anceps Harring & Myers, 1924
- Resticula gelida (Harring & Myers, 1922)
- Resticula lestes Wulfert, 1935
- Resticula melandocus (Gosse, 1887)
- Resticula nyssa Harring & Myers, 1924
- Resticula plicata Wulfert, 1935
- Resticula vermiculus Wulfert, 1935
