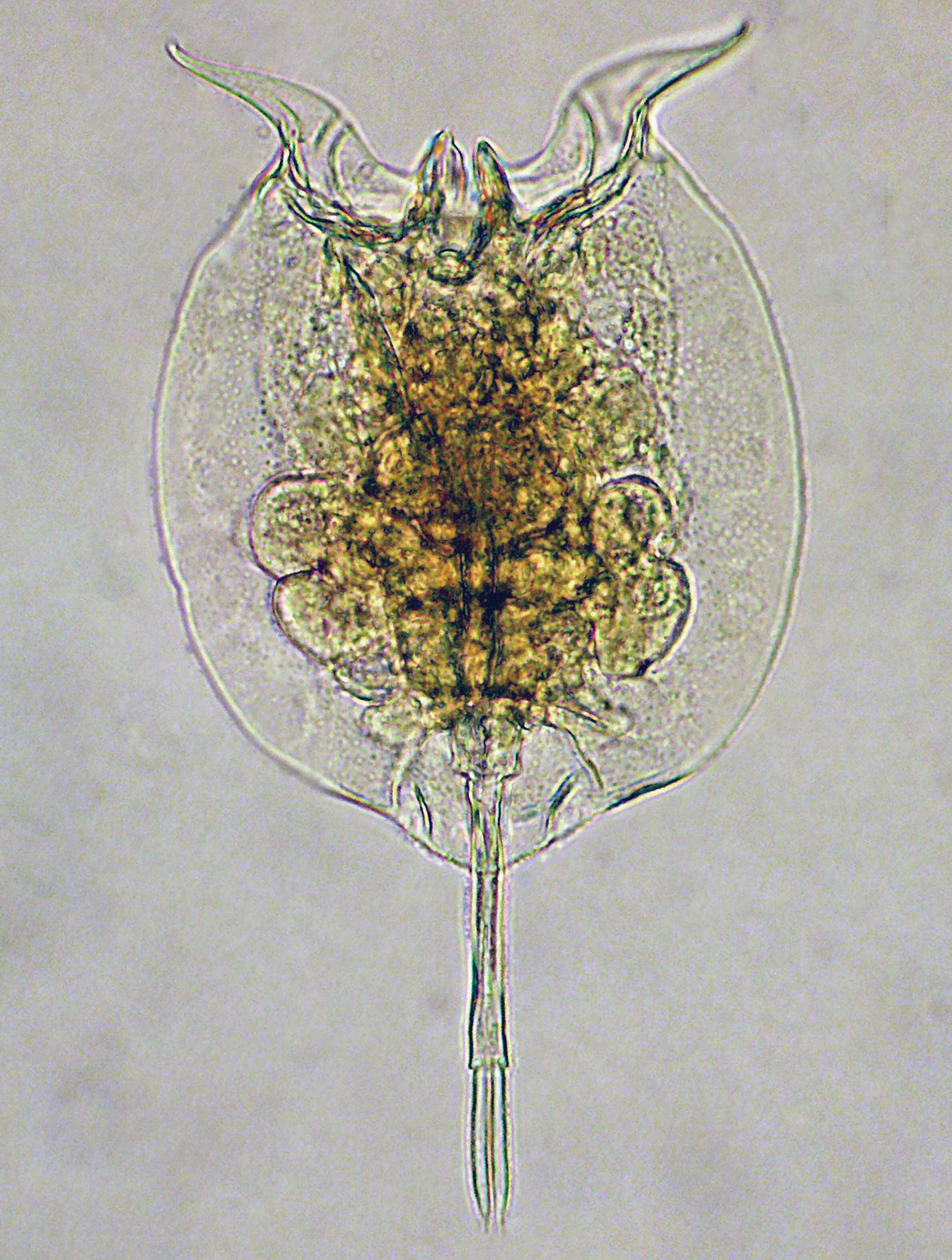
- Pulchritia dorsicornuta

Scientific classification
- Kingdom: Animalia
- Phylum: Rotifera
- Class: Monogononta
- Order: Ploima
- Family: Trichotriidae
- Genus: Pulchritia; Luo & Segers, 2013
- Species: P. dorsicornuta

Binomial name
- Pulchritia dorsicornuta (Van Oye, 1926)

= Pulchritia =

Genus of rotifers

Pulchritia is a monotypic genus of rotifers belonging to the family Trichotriidae. The only species is Pulchritia dorsicornuta.
