= Ploesoma =

Scientific classification
- Domain: Eukaryota
- Kingdom: Animalia
- Phylum: Rotifera
- Class: Monogononta
- Order: Ploima
- Family: Synchaetidae
- Genus: Ploesoma; Herrick, 1885

Synonyms
- Bipalpus Wierzejski & Zacharias, 1893

Genus of rotifers

Ploesoma is a genus of rotifers belonging to the family Synchaetidae.

The species of this genus are found in Europe and Northern America.

Species:

- Ploesoma africanum Wulfert, 1965
- Ploesoma hudsoni (Imhof, 1891)
