= Albertia =

Scientific classification
- Domain: Eukaryota
- Kingdom: Animalia
- Phylum: Rotifera
- Class: Monogononta
- Order: Ploima
- Family: Dicranophoridae
- Genus: Albertia; Dujardin, 1838

Genus of rotifers

Albertia is a genus of rotifers belonging to the family Dicranophoridae.

The genus was first described by Dujardin in 1838.

Species:

- Albertia crystallina Schultze, 1851
- Albertia naidis
- Albertia ovagranulata Valovaya, 1991
