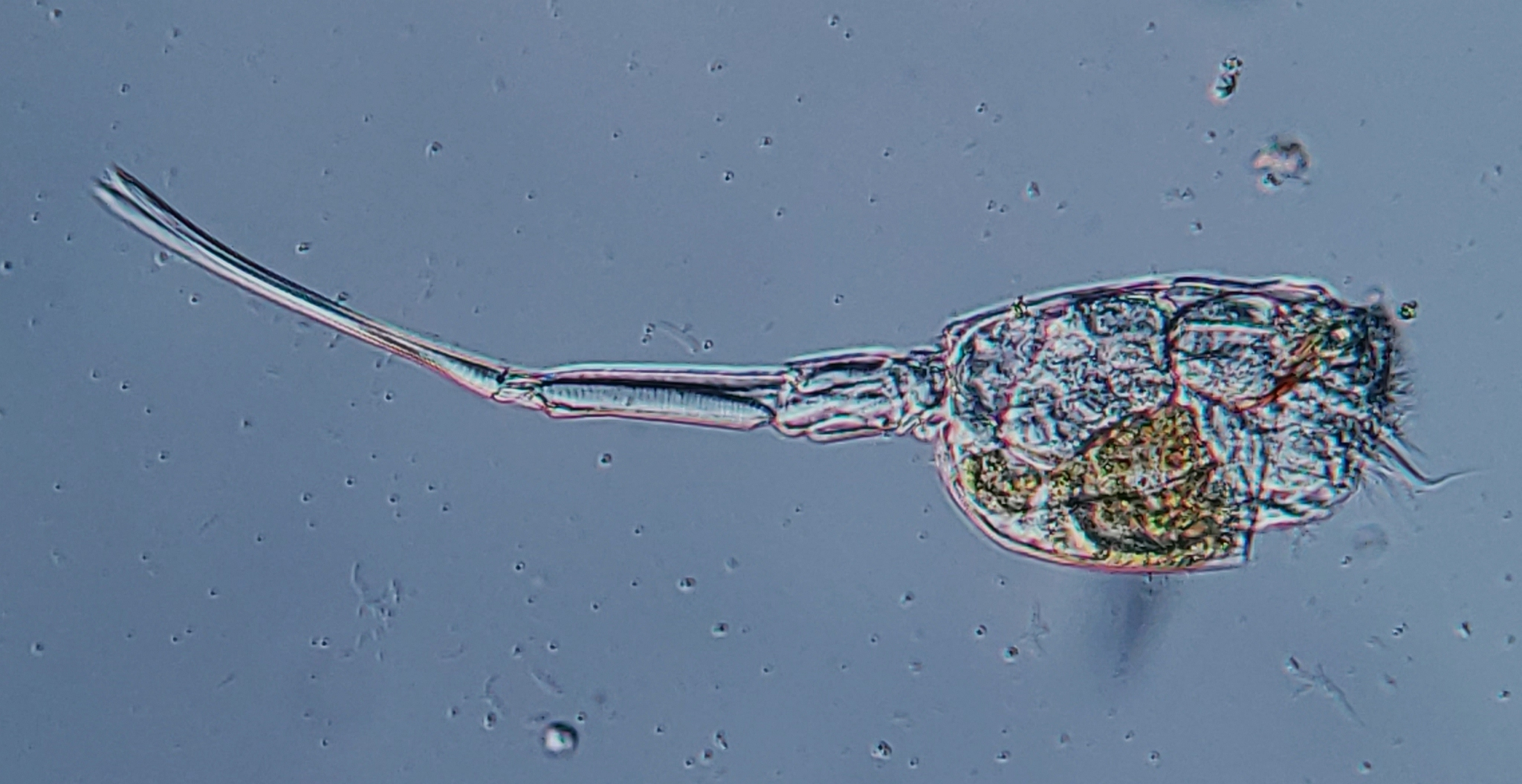

Scientific classification
- Kingdom: Animalia
- Phylum: Rotifera
- Class: Monogononta
- Order: Ploima
- Family: Scaridiidae
- Genus: Scaridium; Ehrenberg, 1830

= Scaridium =

Genus of rotifers

Scaridium is a genus of rotifers belonging to the family Scaridiidae.

The genus has a cosmopolitan distribution.

Species:

- Scaridium bostjani Daems & Dumont, 1974
- Scaridium elegans Segers & De Meester, 1994
