= Lindia =

Scientific classification
- Domain: Eukaryota
- Kingdom: Animalia
- Phylum: Rotifera
- Class: Monogononta
- Order: Ploima
- Family: Lindiidae
- Genus: Lindia; Dujardin, 1841

Genus of rotifers

Lindia is a genus of rotifers belonging to the family Lindiidae.

The genus has almost cosmopolitan distribution.

Species:

- Lindia anebodica Bērziņš, 1949
- Lindia annecta Harring & Myers, 1922
