= Elosa =

Scientific classification
- Domain: Eukaryota
- Kingdom: Animalia
- Phylum: Rotifera
- Class: Monogononta
- Order: Ploima
- Family: Trichocercidae
- Genus: Elosa; Lord, 1891

Genus of rotifers

Elosa is a genus of rotifers belonging to the family Trichocercidae.

The species of this genus are found in Europe.

Species:

- Elosa spinifera Wiszniewski, 1932
- Elosa worrallii Lord, 1891
