= Ascomorpha =

Scientific classification
- Domain: Eukaryota
- Kingdom: Animalia
- Phylum: Rotifera
- Class: Monogononta
- Order: Ploima
- Family: Gastropodidae
- Genus: Ascomorpha; Perty, 1850

Genus of rotifers

Ascomorpha is a genus of rotifers belonging to the family Gastropodidae.

The genus has almost cosmopolitan distribution.

Species:

- Ascomorpha agilis Zacharias, 1893
- Ascomorpha dumonti De Smet, 1992
- Ascomorpha ecaudis Perty, 1850
- Ascomorpha ovalis (Bergendahl, 1892)

Species brought into synonymy

- Ascomorpha ecaudatus Perty, 1850 : synonym of Ascomorpha ecaudis Perty, 1850
