= Gastropus =

Scientific classification
- Kingdom: Animalia
- Phylum: Rotifera
- Class: Monogononta
- Order: Ploima
- Family: Gastropodidae
- Genus: Gastropus; Imhof, 1898

Genus of rotifers

Gastropus, from Ancient Greek γαστήρ (gastḗr), meaning "belly", and πούς (poús), meaning "foot", is a genus of rotifers belonging to the family Gastropodidae.

The species of this genus are found in Europe, Australia and Northern America.

Species:

- Gastropus hyptopus (Ehrenberg, 1838)
- Gastropus minor (Rousselet, 1892)
