= Monommata =

Scientific classification
- Domain: Eukaryota
- Kingdom: Animalia
- Phylum: Rotifera
- Class: Monogononta
- Order: Ploima
- Family: Notommatidae
- Genus: Monommata; Bartsch, 1870

Genus of rotifers

Monommata is a genus of rotifers belonging to the family Notommatidae.

The species of this genus are found in Europe, Australia and Northern America.

Species:

- Monommata actices Myers, 1930
- Monommata aequalis (Ehrenberg, 1830)
- Monommata aeschyna Myers, 1930
- Monommata appendiculata Stenroos, 1898
- Monommata astia Myers, 1930
- Monommata caeca Myers, 1930
- Monommata caudata Myers, 1930
- Monommata dentata Wulfert, 1940
- Monommata diaphora Myers, 1930
- Monommata dissimilis Berzinš, 1949
- Monommata enedra Myers, 1930
- Monommata grandis Tessin, 1890
- Monommata hyalina Myers, 1930
- Monommata longiseta (Müller, 1786)
- Monommata maculata Harring & Myers, 193
- Monommata orbis (Müller, 1776)
- Monommata phoxa Myers, 1930
- Monommata pseudophoxa Wulfert, 1960
- Monommata viridis Myers, 1937
