= Wierzejskiella =

Scientific classification
- Domain: Eukaryota
- Kingdom: Animalia
- Phylum: Rotifera
- Class: Monogononta
- Order: Ploima
- Family: Dicranophoridae
- Genus: Wierzejskiella; Wiszniewski, 1934

Genus of rotifers

Wierzejskiella is a genus of rotifers belonging to the family Dicranophoridae.

The species of this genus are found in Europe and America.

Species:

- Wierzejskiella ambigua (Tzschaschel, 1979)
- Wierzejskiella elongata (Glascott, 1893)
