= Lindiidae =

Scientific classification
- Domain: Eukaryota
- Kingdom: Animalia
- Phylum: Rotifera
- Class: Monogononta
- Order: Ploima
- Family: Lindiidae

Family of rotifers

Lindiidae is a family of rotifers belonging to the order Ploima.

Genera:

- Halolindia Remane, 1933
- Lindia Dujardin, 1841
