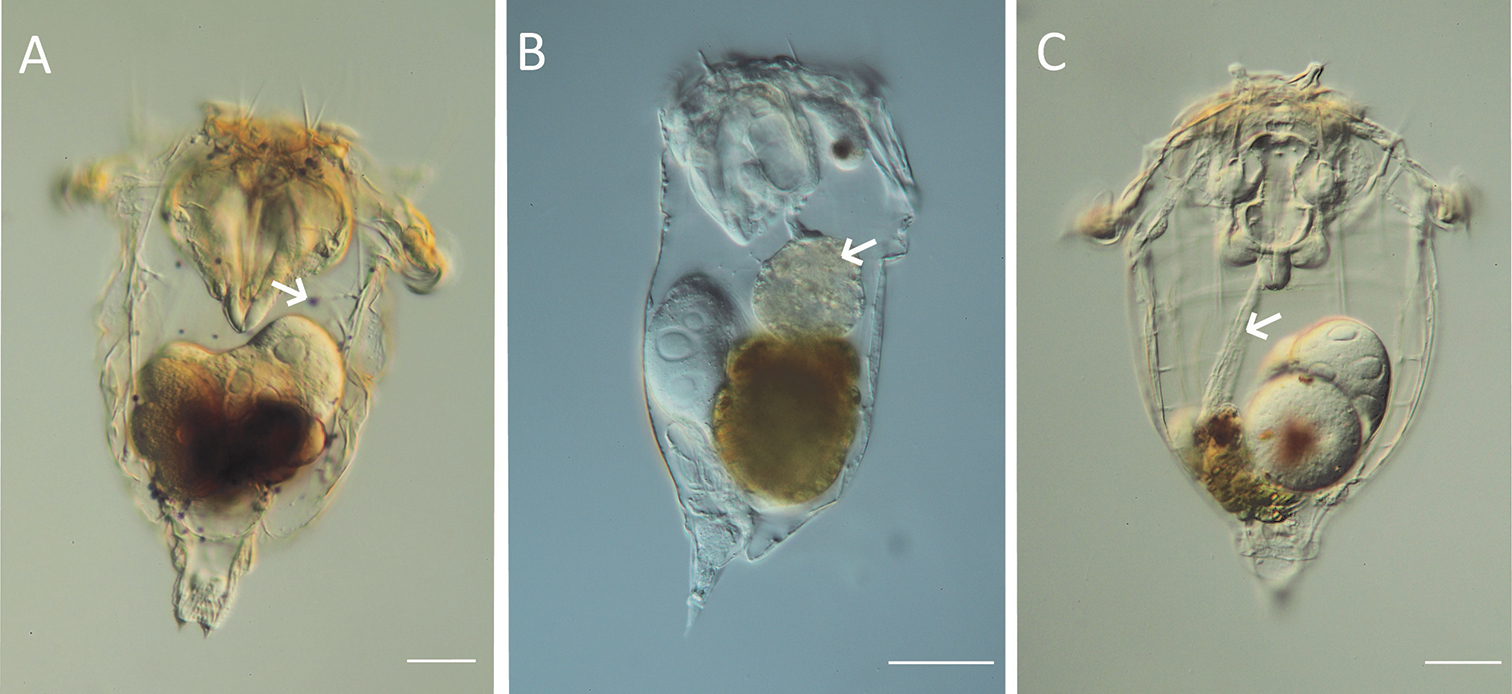
- Synchaeta spp.

Scientific classification
- Domain: Eukaryota
- Kingdom: Animalia
- Phylum: Rotifera
- Class: Monogononta
- Order: Ploima
- Family: Synchaetidae

= Synchaetidae =

Family of rotifers

Synchaetidae is a family of rotifers belonging to the order Ploima.

Genera:

- Bipalpus Herrick, 1885
- Ploesoma Herrick, 1885
- Polyarthra Ehrenberg, 1834
- Pseudoploesoma Myers, 1938
- Synchaeta Ehrenberg, 1832
