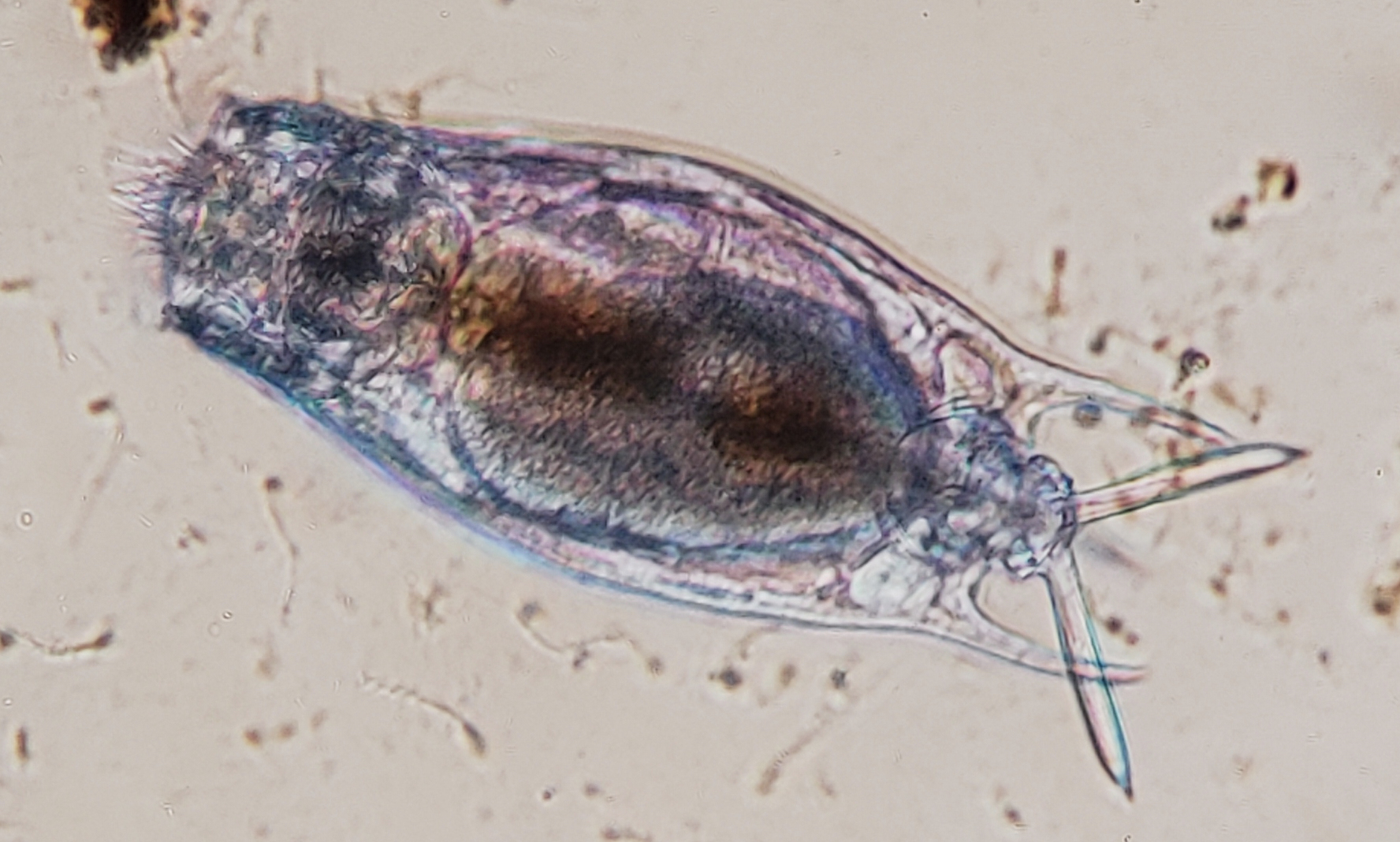
- Mytilina ventralis

Scientific classification
- Kingdom: Animalia
- Phylum: Rotifera
- Class: Monogononta
- Order: Ploima
- Family: Mytilinidae; Harring, 1913

= Mytilinidae =

Family of rotifers

Mytilinidae is a family of rotifers belonging to the order Ploima.

Genera:

- Lophocharis Ehrenberg, 1838
- Mytilina Bory de St.Vincent, 1826
