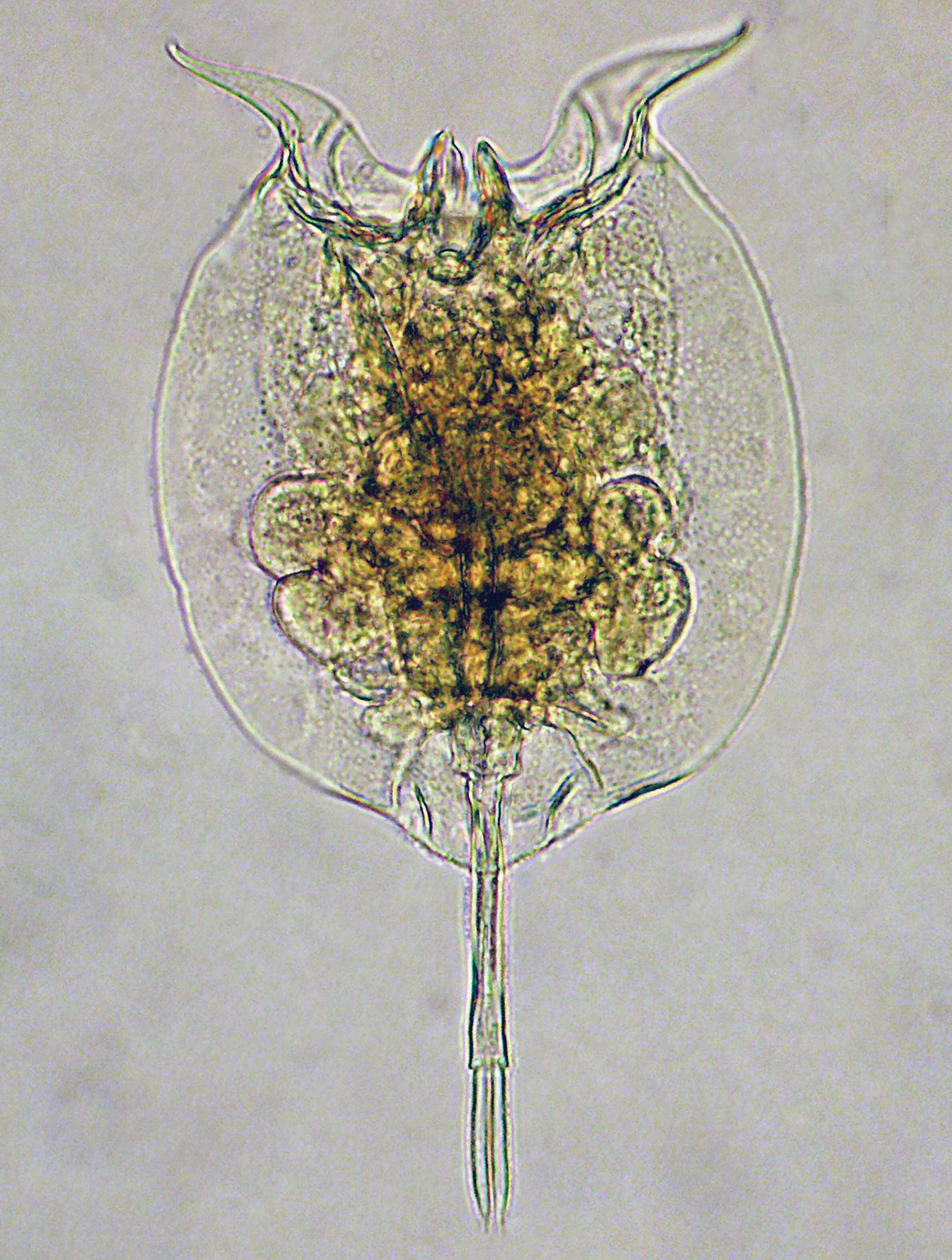
- Pulchritia dorsicornuta

Scientific classification
- Domain: Eukaryota
- Kingdom: Animalia
- Phylum: Rotifera
- Class: Monogononta
- Order: Ploima
- Family: Trichotriidae

Synonyms
- Trichotridae

= Trichotriidae =

Family of rotifers

Trichotriidae is a family of rotifers belonging to the order Ploima.

Genera:

- Macrochaetus Perty, 1850
- Pulchritia Luo & Segers, 2013
- Trichotria Bory De St.Vincent, 1827
- Wolga Skorikov, 1903
