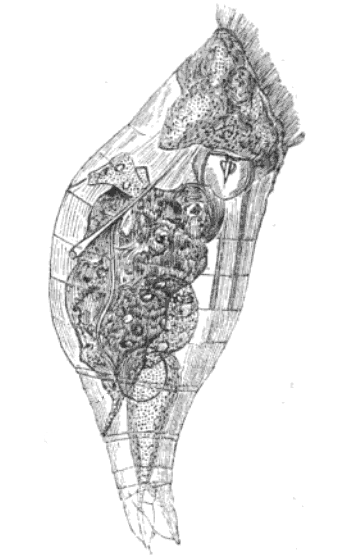
- Proales daphnicola

Scientific classification
- Domain: Eukaryota
- Kingdom: Animalia
- Phylum: Rotifera
- Class: Monogononta
- Order: Ploima
- Family: Proalidae

= Proalidae =

Family of rotifers

Proalidae is a family of rotifers belonging to the order Ploima.

Genera:

- Bryceella Remane, 1929
- Proales Gosse, 1886
- Proalinopsis Weber, 1918
- Wulfertia Donner, 1943
