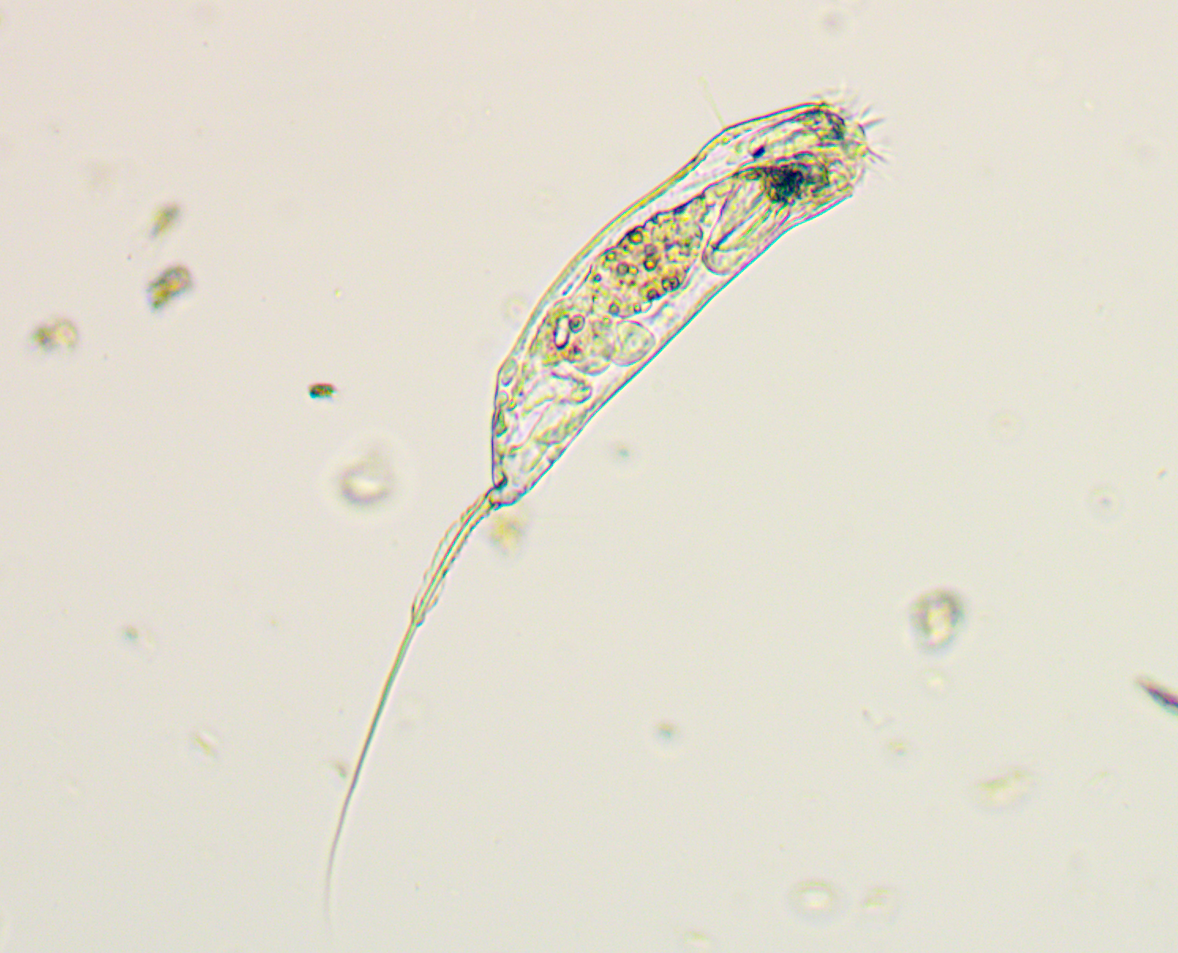
- Trichocerca cylindrica

Scientific classification
- Domain: Eukaryota
- Kingdom: Animalia
- Phylum: Rotifera
- Class: Monogononta
- Order: Ploima
- Family: Trichocercidae

= Trichocercidae =

Family of rotifers

Trichocercidae is a family of rotifers belonging to the order Ploima.

Genera:

- Ascomorphella Wiszniewski, 1953
- Coelopus (synonym of Trichocerca)
- Diurella
- Elosa Lord, 1891
- Trichocerca Lamarck, 1801
