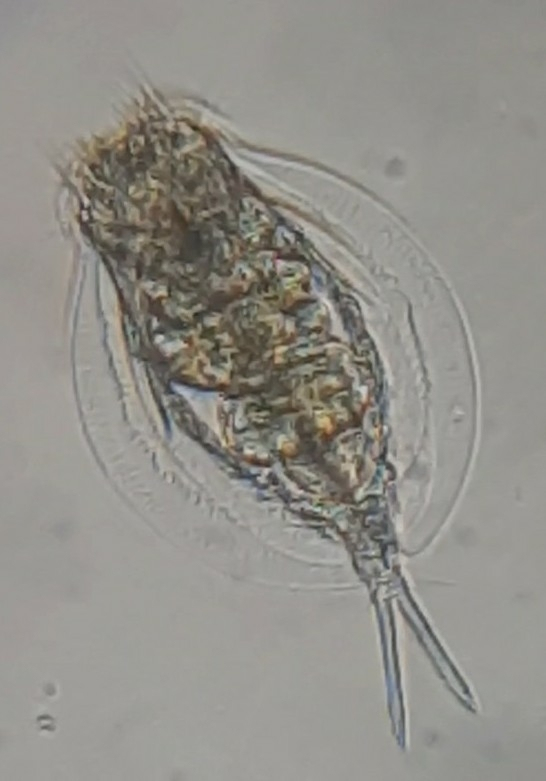
- Euchlanis triquetra

Scientific classification
- Kingdom: Animalia
- Phylum: Rotifera
- Class: Monogononta
- Order: Ploima
- Family: Euchlanidae; Ehrenberg, 1838

Genera
- See text.

= Euchlanidae =

Family of rotifers

Euchlanidae is a family of rotifers belonging to the order Ploima.

Genera:

- Beauchampiella Remane, 1929
- Dipleuchlanis de Beauchamp, 1910
- Diplois Gosse, 1886
- Euchlanis Ehrenberg, 1832
- Pseudoeuchlanis Dhanapathi, 1978
- Tripleuchlanis Myers, 1930
