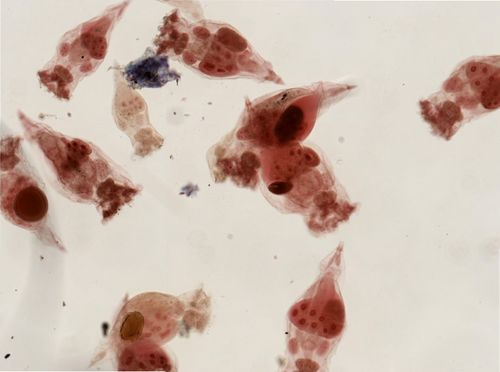
- Epiphanes senta

Scientific classification
- Domain: Eukaryota
- Kingdom: Animalia
- Phylum: Rotifera
- Class: Monogononta
- Order: Ploima
- Family: Epiphanidae

= Epiphanidae =

Family of rotifers

Epiphanidae is a family of rotifers belonging to the order Ploima.

Genera:

- Cyrtonia Rousselet, 1894
- Epiphanes Ehrenberg, 1832
- Liliferotrocha Sudzuki, 1959
- Microcodides Bergendal, 1892
- Proalides de Beauchamp, 1907
- Rhinoglena Ehrenberg, 1853
