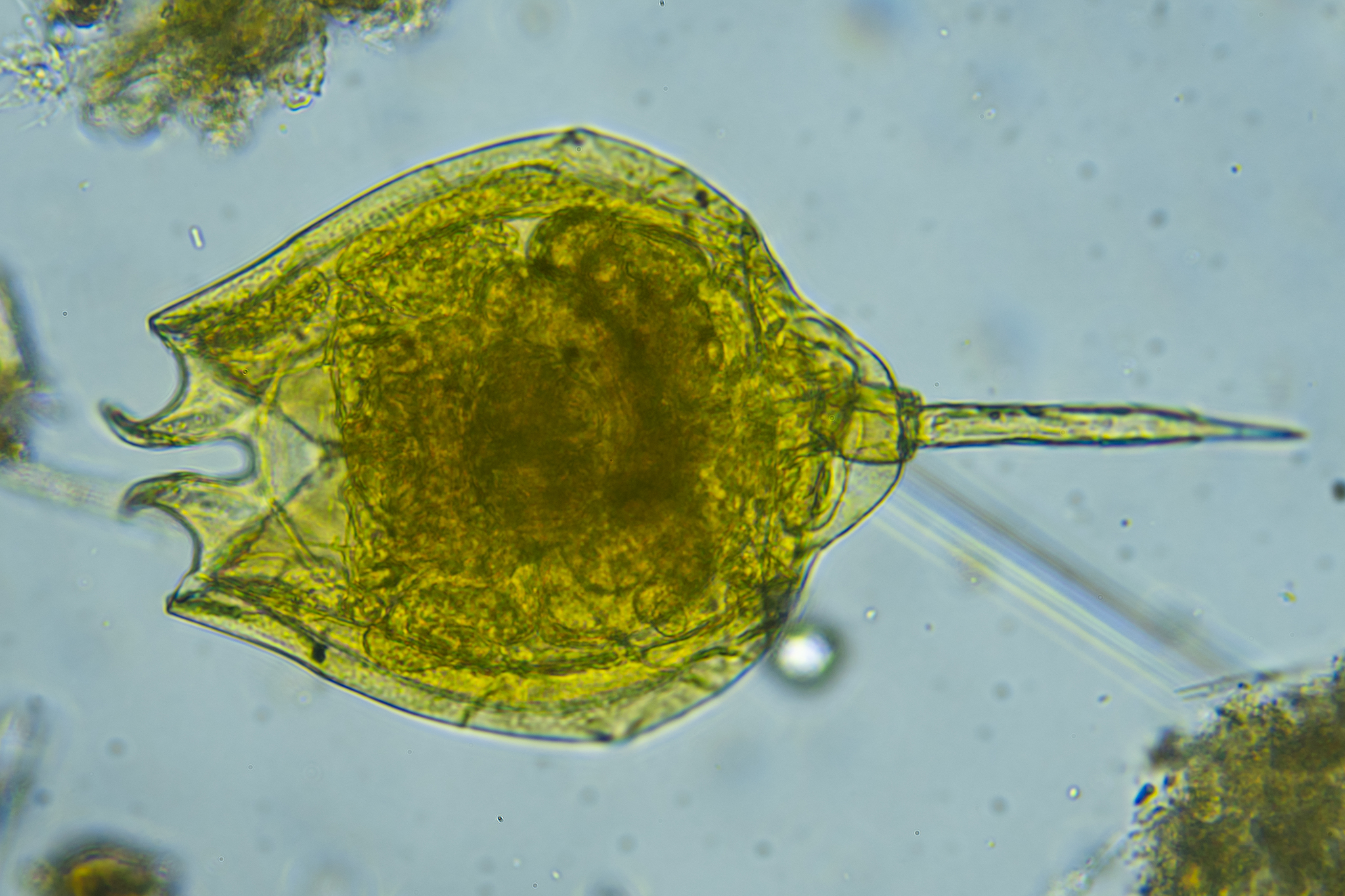
- Lecane quadridentata

Scientific classification
- Kingdom: Animalia
- Phylum: Rotifera
- Class: Monogononta
- Order: Ploima
- Family: Lecanidae; Remane, 1933
- Genus: Lecane; Nitzsch, 1827

Synonyms
- List: Cathypua Hofsten, 1909; Diarthra Daday, 1897; Distyla Eckstein, 1883; Hemimonostyla Bartos, 1959; Monostyla Ehrenberg, 1830

= Lecane =

Genus of rotifers

Lecane is a genus of rotifers belonging to the family Lecanidae. It is the only genus in the monotypic family Lecanidae and has a cosmopolitan distribution.

== Species ==
The following species are recognised in the genus Lecane:

- Lecane abanica Segers, 1994
- Lecane acanthinula (Hauer, 1938)
- Lecane aculeata (Jakubski, 1912)
- Lecane acus (Harring, 1913)
- Lecane aeganea Harring, 1914
- Lecane affinis (Levander, 1894)
- Lecane agilis (Bryce, 1892)
- Lecane althausi Rudescu, 1960
- Lecane amazonica (Murray, 1913)
- Lecane arcuata (Bryce, 1891)
- Lecane arcula Harring, 1914
- Lecane armata Thomasson, 1971
- Lecane aspasia Myers, 1917
- Lecane asymmetrica (Murray, 1913)
- Lecane baimaii Sanoamuang & Savatenalinton, 1999
- Lecane balatonica Varga, 1944
- Lecane batillifer (Murray, 1913)
- Lecane bidactyla (Sudzuki, 1999)
- Lecane bifastigata Hauer, 1938
- Lecane bifurca (Bryce, 1892)
- Lecane blachei Berzinš, 1973
- Lecane boettgeri Koste, 1986
- Lecane boliviana Segers, 1994
- Lecane boorali Koste & Shiel, 1983
- Lecane branchicola (Piovanelli, 1903)
- Lecane braumi Koste, 1988
- Lecane braziliensis Segers, 1993
- Lecane broaensis Segers & Dumont, 1995
- Lecane bryophila Koniar, 1957
- Lecane bulla (Gosse, 1851)
- Lecane calcaria Harring & Myers, 1926
- Lecane candida Harring & Myers, 1926
- Lecane carpatica Rudescu, 1960
- Lecane chinesensis Zhuge & Koste, 1996
- Lecane clara (Bryce, 1892)
- Lecane climacois Harring & Myers, 1926
- Lecane closterocerca (Schmarda, 1859)
- Lecane copeis (Harring & Myers, 1926)
- Lecane cornuta (Müller, 1786)
- Lecane crenata (Harring, 1913)
- Lecane crepida Harring, 1914
- Lecane curvicornis (Murray, 1913)
- Lecane decipiens (Murray, 1913)
- Lecane depressa (Bryce, 1891)
- Lecane deridderae Koste, 1972
- Lecane difficilis Segers & Pourriot, 1997
- Lecane donneri Chengalath & Mulamoottil, 1974
- Lecane donyanaensis Mazuelos & Segers, 1994
- Lecane dorysimilis
- Lecane doryssa Harring, 1914
- Lecane dumonti Segers, 1993
- Lecane dysorata Myers, 1942
- Lecane elasma Harring & Myers, 1926
- Lecane elegans Harring, 1914
- Lecane elliptoides (Rodewald, 1937)
- Lecane elongata Harring & Myers, 1926
- Lecane elsa Hauer, 1931
- Lecane enowi Segers & Mertens, 1997
- Lecane ercodes Harring, 1914
- Lecane eswari Dhanapathi, 1976
- Lecane eutarsa Harring & Myers, 1926
- Lecane eylesi Russell, 1953
- Lecane fadeevi (Neisvestnova-Shadina, 1935)
- Lecane flabellata Edmondson, 1936
- Lecane flexilis (Gosse, 1886)
- Lecane flexlils
- Lecane formosa Harring & Myers, 1926
- Lecane furcata (Murray, 1913)
- Lecane fusilis Myers, 1936
- Lecane galeata (Bryce, 1892)
- Lecane gallagherorum Segers, 1997
- Lecane gillardi Berzinš, 1960
- Lecane gissensis (Eckstein, 1883)
- Lecane glandulosa Sudzuki, 1991
- Lecane goniata Harring & Myers
- Lecane gracilis (Sachse, 1914)
- Lecane grandis (Murray, 1913)
- Lecane gwileti (Tarnogradsky, 1930)
- Lecane haliclysta Harring & Myers, 1926
- Lecane halsei Segers & Shiel, 2003
- Lecane hamata (Stokes, 1896)
- Lecane hastata (Murray, 1913)
- Lecane herzigi Koste, Shiel & Tan, 1988
- Lecane hornemanni (Ehrenberg, 1834)
- Lecane hospes Donner, 1951
- Lecane imbricata Carlin, 1939
- Lecane inconspicua Segers & Dumont, 1993
- Lecane inermis (Bryce, 1892)
- Lecane infula Harring & Myers, 1926
- Lecane inopinata Harring & Myers, 1926
- Lecane inquieta Myers, 1936
- Lecane insulaconae Fontaneto, Segers & Melone, 2008
- Lecane intrasinuata (Olofsson, 1917)
- Lecane isanensis Sanoamuang & Savatenalinton, 2001
- Lecane ivli (Wiszniewski, 1935)
- Lecane jaintiaensis Sharma, 1987
- Lecane jessupi Harring, 1921
- Lecane junki Koste, 1975
- Lecane kluchor Tarnogradsky, 1930
- Lecane kunthuleensis Chittapun, Pholpunthin & Segers, 2003
- Lecane kutikowa Koste, 1972
- Lecane lamellata (Daday, 1893)
- Lecane langsenensis Trinh-Dang, Phan & Vo, 2019
- Lecane lateralis Sharma, 1978
- Lecane latissima Yamamoto, 1955
- Lecane lauterborni Hauer, 1924
- Lecane leontina (Turner, 1892)
- Lecane leura Myers, 1942
- Lecane levistyla (Olofsson, 1917)
- Lecane ligona (Dunlop, 1901)
- Lecane ludwigii (Eckstein, 1883)
- Lecane luna (Müller, 1776)
- Lecane lunaris (Ehrenberg, 1832)
- Lecane lungae Savatenalinton & Segers, 2005
- Lecane marchantaria Koste & Robertson, 1983
- Lecane margalefi De Manuel, 1994
- Lecane margarethae Segers, 1991
- Lecane marshi Harring, 1914
- Lecane martensi Savatenalinton & Segers, 2008
- Lecane matsaluensis Riikoja, 1933
- Lecane mawsoni Russell, 1958
- Lecane melini Thomasson, 1953
- Lecane minuta Segers, 1994
- Lecane mira (Murray, 1913)
- Lecane mitella (Myers, 1936)
- Lecane mitis Harring & Myers, 1926
- Lecane monostyla (Daday, 1897)
- Lecane mucronata Harring & Myers, 1926
- Lecane myersi Segers, 1993
- Lecane namatai Segers & Mertens, 1997
- Lecane nana (Murray, 1913)
- Lecane nelsoni Segers, 1994
- Lecane nigeriensis Segers, 1993
- Lecane niothis Harring & Myers, 1926
- Lecane nitida (Murray, 1913)
- Lecane niwati Segers, Kotetip & Sanoamuang, 2004
- Lecane noobijupi Segers & Shiel, 2003
- Lecane nwadiaroi Segers, 1993
- Lecane obtusa (Murray, 1913)
- Lecane ohiensis (Herrick, 1885)
- Lecane ohioensis (Herrick, 1885)
- Lecane opias (Harring & Myers, 1926)
- Lecane ordwayi Bienert, 1986
- Lecane palinacis Harring & Myers, 1926
- Lecane papuana (Murray, 1913)
- Lecane paradoxa (Steinecke, 1916)
- Lecane pawlowskii Wulfert, 1966
- Lecane paxiana Hauer, 1940
- Lecane pelatis Harring & Myers, 1926
- Lecane perplexa (Ahlstrom, 1938)
- Lecane perpusilla (Hauer, 1929)
- Lecane pertica Harring & Myers, 1926
- Lecane phapi
- Lecane plesia Myers, 1936
- Lecane pluto Segers & Mertens, 1997
- Lecane pomiformis Edmondson, 1938
- Lecane proiecta Hauer, 1956
- Lecane psammophila (Wiszniewski, 1932)
- Lecane pumila (Rousselet, 1906)
- Lecane punctata (Murray, 1913)
- Lecane pusilla Harring, 1914
- Lecane pustulosa Myers, 1938
- Lecane pycina Harring & Myers, 1926
- Lecane pyriformis (Daday, 1905)
- Lecane pyrrha Harring & Myers, 1926
- Lecane quadridentata (Ehrenberg, 1830)
- Lecane remanei Hauer, 1964
- Lecane rhacois Harring & Myers, 1926
- Lecane rhenana Hauer, 1929
- Lecane rhopalura (Harring & Myers, 1926)
- Lecane rhytida Harring & Myers, 1926
- Lecane robertsonae Segers, 1993
- Lecane romeroi (Pardo, 1931)
- Lecane rudescui Hauer, 1965
- Lecane rugosa (Harring, 1914)
- Lecane rusticula (Gosse, 1886)
- Lecane ruttneri Hauer, 1938
- Lecane sagula Harring & Myers, 1926
- Lecane satyrus Harring & Myers, 1926
- Lecane schraederi Wulfert, 1966
- Lecane scutata (Harring & Myers, 1926)
- Lecane segersi Sanoamuang, 1996
- Lecane serrata (Hauer, 1938)
- Lecane shieli Segers & Sanoamuang, 1994
- Lecane sibina Harring, 1914
- Lecane signifera (Jennings, 1896)
- Lecane simonneae Segers, 1993
- Lecane sinuata (Hauer, 1938)
- Lecane sinuosa Nogrady, 1957
- Lecane sola Hauer, 1936
- Lecane solfatara (Hauer, 1938)
- Lecane spiniventris Segers, 1994
- Lecane spinulifera Edmondson, 1935
- Lecane stenroosi (Meissner, 1908)
- Lecane stephensae (Hutchinson, 1931)
- Lecane stichaea Harring, 1913
- Lecane stichoclysta Segers, 1993
- Lecane stokesii (Pell, 1890)
- Lecane styrax (Harring & Myers, 1926)
- Lecane subtilis Harring & Myers, 1926
- Lecane subulata (Harring & Myers, 1926)
- Lecane sulcata (Gosse, 1886)
- Lecane superaculeata Sanoamuang & Segers, 1997
- Lecane sverigis Ahlstrom, 1934
- Lecane sylviae Segers, 1993
- Lecane symoensi De Ridder, 1981
- Lecane sympoda Hauer, 1929
- Lecane syngenes (Hauer, 1938)
- Lecane tabida Harring & Myers, 1926
- Lecane tabulifera Edmondson, 1936
- Lecane tanganyikae Segers & Baribwegure, 1996
- Lecane tenua Myers, 1936
- Lecane tenuiseta Harring, 1914
- Lecane thailandensis Segers & Sanoamuang, 1994
- Lecane thalera (Harring & Myers, 1926)
- Lecane thienemanni (Hauer, 1938)
- Lecane tryphema Harring & Myers, 1926
- Lecane tuxeni De Ridder, 1970
- Lecane uenoi Yamamoto, 1951
- Lecane undulata Hauer, 1938
- Lecane unguitata (Fadeev, 1925)
- Lecane ungulata (Gosse, 1887)
- Lecane urna Nogrady, 1962
- Lecane venusta Harring & Myers, 1926
- Lecane verecunda Harring & Myers, 1926
- Lecane whitfordi (Ahlstrom, 1938)
- Lecane yatseni Wei & Xu, 2010
- Lecane zhanjiangensis Wei, Jersabek & Yang, 2019
- Monostyla constricta Sudzuki, 1992
- Monostyla dentata Sudzuki, 1992
- Monostyla psammophila Myers, 1936
- Monostyla sinuata
- BOLD:AAN2893 (Lecane sp.)
- BOLD:AAN2894 (Lecane sp.)
- BOLD:AAN3260 (Lecane sp.)
- BOLD:AAP1003 (Lecane sp.)
- BOLD:AAP1004 (Lecane sp.)
- BOLD:AAV7931 (Lecane sp.)
- BOLD:AAX0098 (Lecane sp.)
- BOLD:AAY8775 (Lecane sp.)
- BOLD:AAZ7519 (Lecane sp.)
- BOLD:AAZ8141 (Lecane sp.)
- BOLD:ABA0362 (Lecane sp.)
- BOLD:ABA0369 (Lecane sp.)
- BOLD:ABA0370 (Lecane sp.)
- BOLD:ABA0371 (Lecane sp.)
- BOLD:ABA0475 (Lecane sp.)
- BOLD:ABA7453 (Lecane sp.)
- BOLD:ADW5755 (Lecane sp.)
- BOLD:ADX1966 (Lecane sp.)
