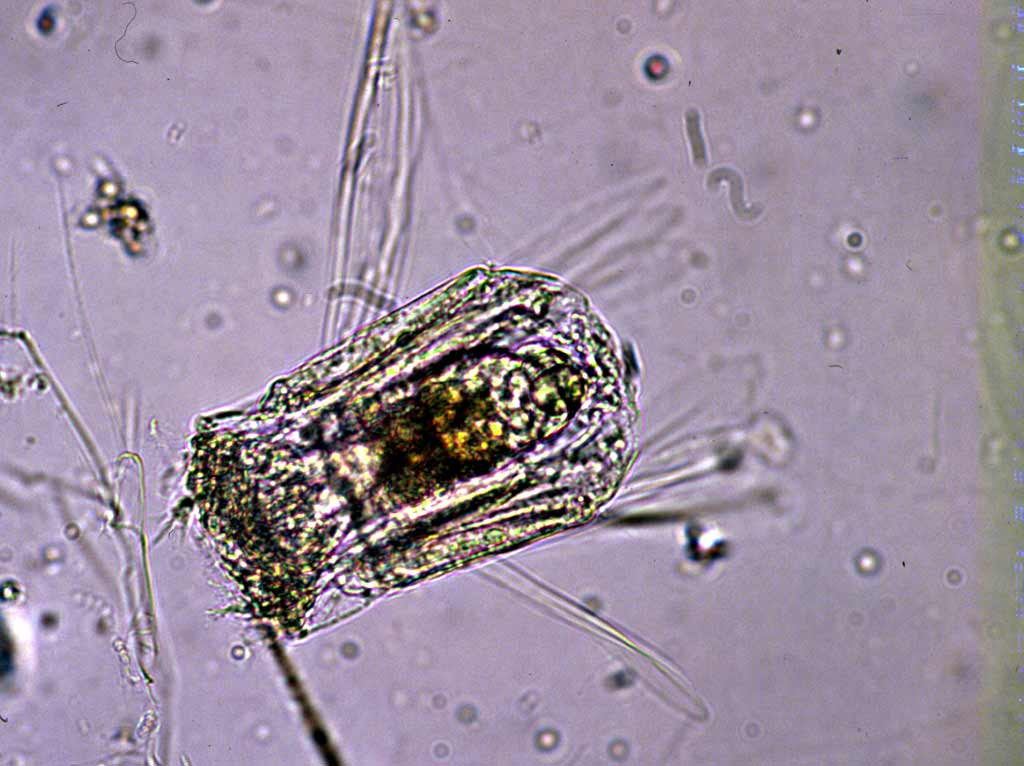
- Polyarthra sp.

Scientific classification
- Domain: Eukaryota
- Kingdom: Animalia
- Phylum: Rotifera
- Class: Monogononta
- Order: Ploima
- Family: Synchaetidae
- Genus: Polyarthra; Ehrenberg, 1834

= Polyarthra (rotifer) =

Genus of rotifers

Polyarthra is a genus of rotifers belonging to the family Synchaetidae.

The genus has almost cosmopolitan distribution.

Species:

- Polyarthra bicerca Wulfert, 1956
- Polyarthra dissimulans Nipkow, 1952
