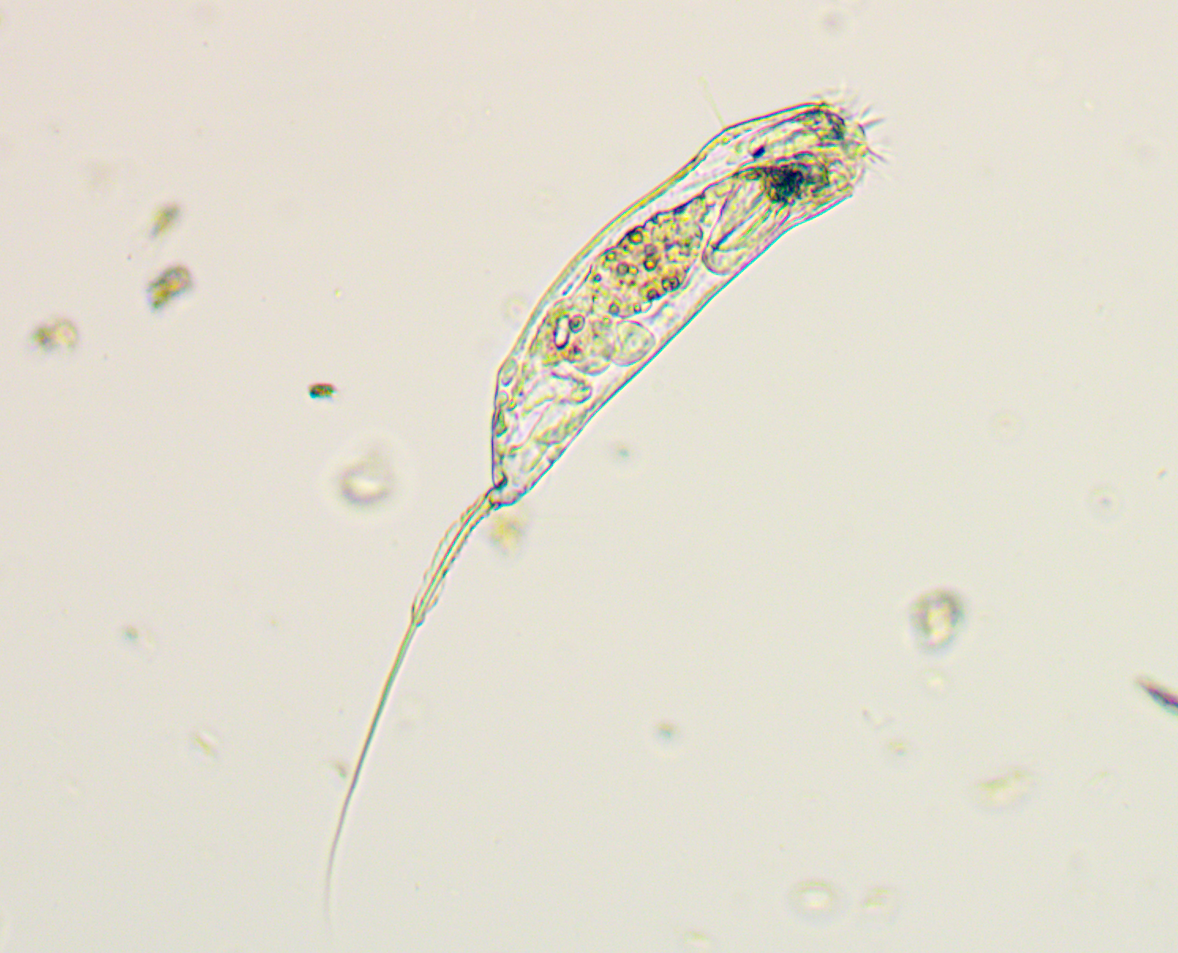
- Trichocerca cylindrica

Scientific classification
- Domain: Eukaryota
- Kingdom: Animalia
- Phylum: Rotifera
- Class: Monogononta
- Order: Ploima
- Family: Trichocercidae
- Genus: Trichocerca

= Trichocerca =

Genus of rotifers

Trichocerca is a genus of rotifers belonging to the family Trichocercidae.

The genus has cosmopolitan distribution.

Species:

- Trichocerca abilioi Segers & Sarma, 1993
- Trichocerca agnatha Wulfert, 1939
