= Gastropodidae =

Scientific classification
- Kingdom: Animalia
- Phylum: Rotifera
- Class: Monogononta
- Order: Ploima
- Family: Gastropodidae; Harring, 1913

Family of rotifers

Gastropodidae, from Ancient Greek γαστήρ (gastḗr), meaning "belly", and πούς (poús), meaning "foot", is a family of rotifers belonging to the order Ploima.

== Genera ==
- Ascomorpha Perty, 1850
- Gastropus Imhof, 1898
