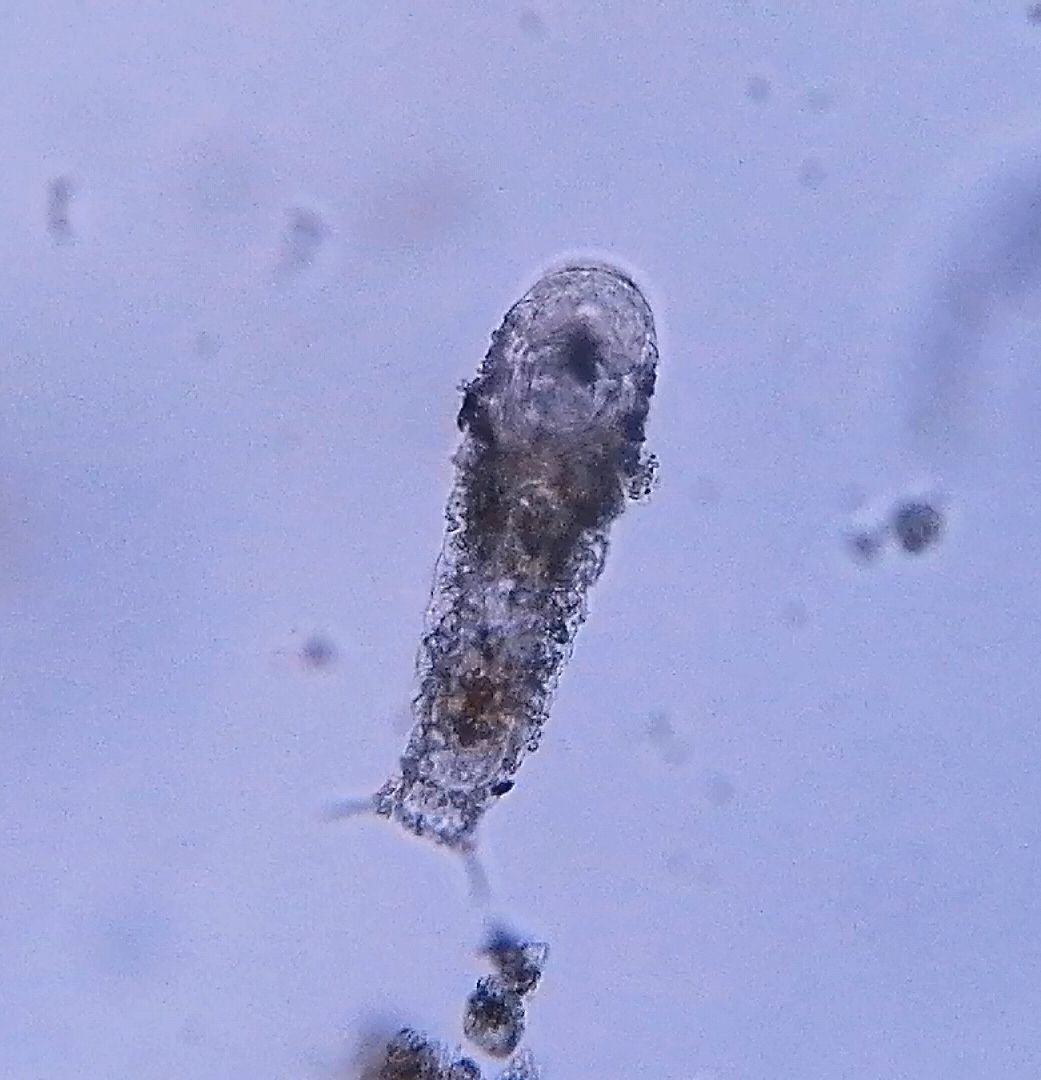
- Taphrocampa selenura

Scientific classification
- Domain: Eukaryota
- Kingdom: Animalia
- Phylum: Rotifera
- Class: Monogononta
- Order: Ploima
- Family: Notommatidae (Hudson & Gosse, 1886)

Genera
- Cephalodella Bory de St. Vincent, 1826; Dorystoma Harring & Myers, 1922; Drilophaga Vejdovsky, 1883; Enteroplea Ehrenberg, 1830; Eosphora Ehrenberg, 1830; Eothinia Harring & Myers, 1922; Monommata Bartsch, 1870; Notommata Ehrenberg, 1830; Pleurata Nogrady & Pourriot, 1995; Pleurotrocha Ehrenberg, 1830; Pleurotrochopsis Bērziņš, 1973; Pourriotia De Smet, 2003; Pseudoharringia Fadeew, 1925; Resticula Harring & Myers, 1924; Rousseletia Harring, 1913; Sphyrias Harring, 1913; Taphrocampa Gosse, 1851; Tylotrochas Harring & Myers, 1922

= Notommatidae =

Family of rotifers

Notommatidae is a family of rotifers in the order Ploima.
