= Dicranophoridae =

Scientific classification
- Domain: Eukaryota
- Kingdom: Animalia
- Phylum: Rotifera
- Class: Monogononta
- Order: Ploima
- Family: Dicranophoridae

Family of rotifers

Dicranophoridae is a family of rotifers belonging to the order Ploima.

== Genera ==
The following genera are accepted by the World Register of Marine Species:

- Albertia Dujardin, 1838
- Aspelta Harring & Myers, 1928
- Dicranophorus Nitzsch, 1827
- Encentrum Ehrenberg, 1838
- Erignatha Harring & Myers, 1922
- Glaciera Jersabek, 1999
- Kostea
- Myersinella Wiszniewski, 1936
- Paradicranophorus Wiszniewski, 1929
- Wierzejskiella Wiszniewski, 1934
- Wigrella Wiszniewski, 1932
