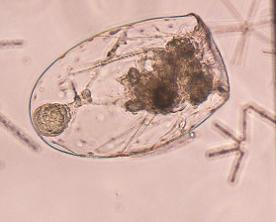
- Asplanchna priodontata

Scientific classification
- Domain: Eukaryota
- Kingdom: Animalia
- Phylum: Rotifera
- Class: Monogononta
- Order: Ploima
- Family: Asplanchnidae

= Asplanchnidae =

Family of rotifers

Asplanchnidae is a family of rotifers belonging to the order Ploima.

Genera:

- Asplanchna Gosse, 1850
- Asplanchnopus de Guerne, 1888
- Harringia de Beauchamp, 1912
- Schochapus Varshney, 1985
