= Ploima =

- Kellicottia longispina and Keratella cochlearis

Scientific classification
- Kingdom: Animalia
- Phylum: Rotifera
- Class: Monogononta
- Superorder: Pseudotrocha
- Order: Ploima (Hudson & Gosse, 1886)

Families
- 15, see text

Order of rotifers

Ploima is an order of rotifers, microscopic invertebrates found in marine and freshwater habitats.

== Families ==
According to the World Register of Marine Species, Ploima includes the following fifteen families:

- Asplanchnidae
- Brachionidae
- Dicranophoridae
- Epiphanidae
- Euchlanidae
- Gastropodidae
- Lecanidae
- Lepadellidae
- Lindiidae
- Mytilinidae
- Notommatidae
- Proalidae
- Synchaetidae
- Trichocercidae
- Trichotriidae
